= Ardière =

Ardières Ardière
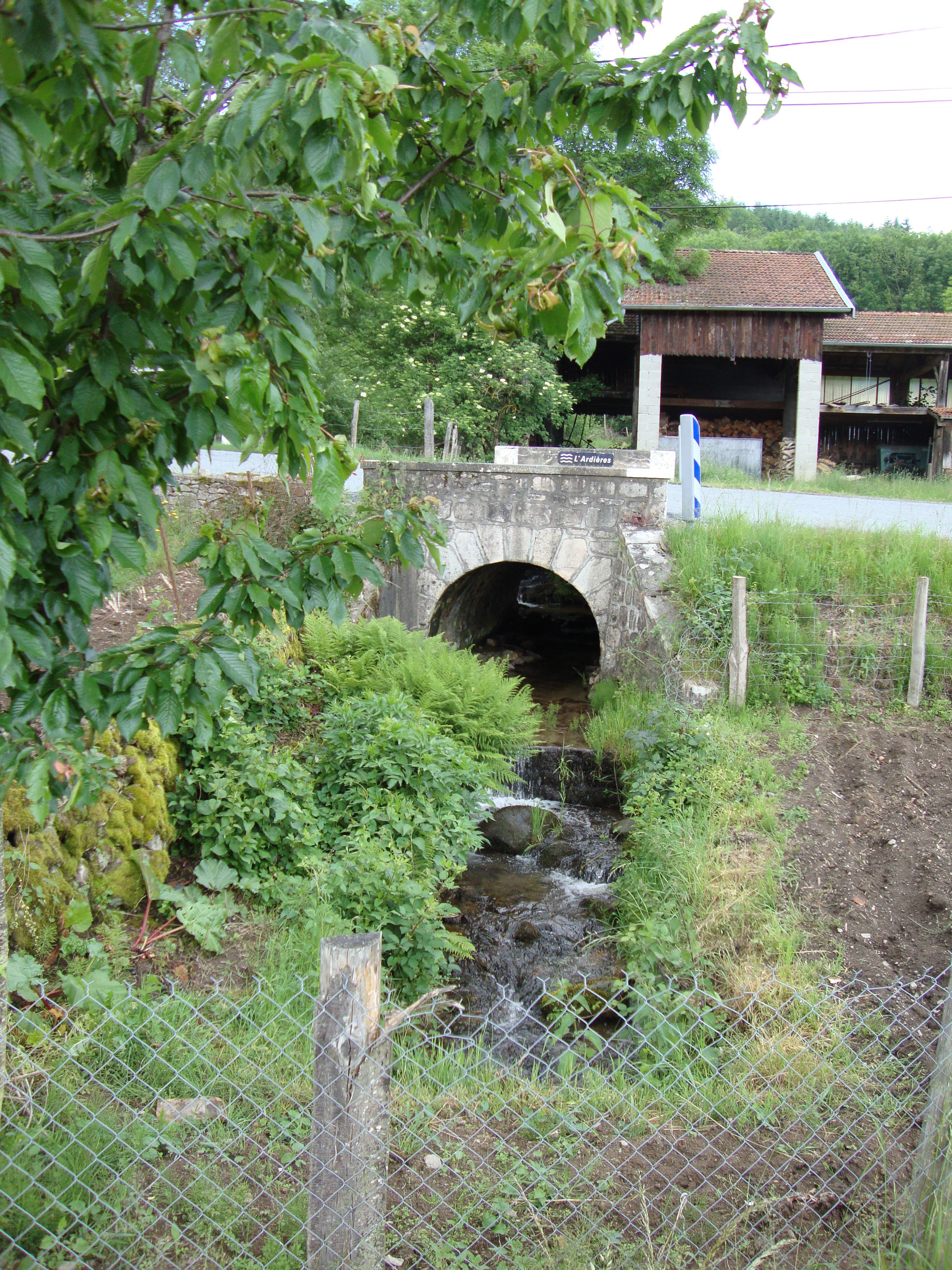
- The Ardières at the point where it is still a stream or creek

- Location within France Location within Auvergne-Rhône-Alpes

Location
- Country: France

Physical characteristics
- Source
  - location: South-east of Mont Monet
  - coordinates: 46.180278°N 4.541389°E
  - elevation: 870 m (2,850 ft)
- Mouth: Saône
  - location: Taponas, France
  - coordinates: 46.1225°N 4.7675°E
  - elevation: 170 m (560 ft)
- Length: 30.0 km (18.6 mi)

Basin features
- Progression: Saône→ Rhône→ Mediterranean Sea
- Tributaries
  - left: Ardevel, Morsille
  - right: Saint-Didier, Andilleys, Samsons

The Ardière (French pronunciation: [aʁdjɛʁ], also Ardières) is a river in the Rhône department of France. The Ardière is one of the tributaries of the Saône, which flows from the mountains of Beaujolais.

== Geography ==
The Ardière is 30.0 kilometres (18.6 mi) in length.

The source of the Ardière is to the south-east of Mont Monet (1,001 metres (3,284 ft)) and just below Mont Saint-Rigaud (1,009 metres (3,310 ft)), at an altitude of 870 metres (2,850 ft), within the commune of Les Ardillats. From there, the river flows into the Saône, in the Taponas commune at least a kilometre from the chef-lieu of the Canton of Belleville at an altitude of 170 metres (560 ft) and just after passing beneath the Autoroute of the Sun. The Ardière flows into the Saône just before Montmerle island, opposite Montmerle-sur-Saône. The river valley there is the location of the D37 route départementale.

== Departement and communes traversed ==
The Ardière flows through one departement (Rhône) and 10 communes, listed from upstream to downstream as follows: Les Ardillats, Saint-Didier-sur-Beaujeu, Beaujeu, Lantignié, Quincié-en-Beaujolais, Régnié-Durette, Cercié, Saint-Lager, Saint-Jean-d'Ardières and Taponas.

== Tributaries ==
The Ardière has eleven tributary streams and two branches. Tributaries are listed below, from upstream to downstream. R indicates a right tributary, L indicates a left tributary.

- Gots, 1.7 kilometres (1.1 mi) (R)
- Rochefort, 2.7 kilometres (1.7 mi) (L)
- Vernay, 3.8 kilometres (2.4 mi) (R)
- Pluvier, 2.9 kilometres (1.8 mi) (L)
- Saint-Didier, 5.2 kilometres (3.2 mi) (R)
- Comber, 1.6 kilometres (0.99 mi) (L)
- Font-bidon, 3.1 kilometres (1.9 mi) (L)
- Andilleys, 4.5 kilometres (2.8 mi) (R)
- Samsons, 8.6 kilometres (5.3 mi) (R)
- Ardevel, 7.9 kilometres (4.9 mi) (L)
- Morcille, 9.7 kilometres (6.0 mi) (L)

== Toponyms ==
Local placenames related to the Ardière hydronym include the commune of Saint-Jean-d'Ardières and the commune of the river's source, Les Ardillats.

== Ecology ==
Along the Ardière there are many fragile species, including the martin-pêcheur bird, the Bouvière fish, and fresh-water mussels of the Anodonta genus. One can also find two families of dragonfly (Gomphidae and Aeshnidae) as well as a damselfly, the Mercury Bluet.

Flora include the swamp ragwort and the flowering rush.

== Facilities ==
The zone of the Ardière's drainage basin has been recognised as likely to benefit from a reduction in pollution by pesticides and runoff from viticulture as well as homes and communities. The Rhône-Alpes region launched and tender for the years 2003–2006.

== See also ==
- List of rivers of France
