= Juliénas AOC =

French Beaujolais wine

- Wine region
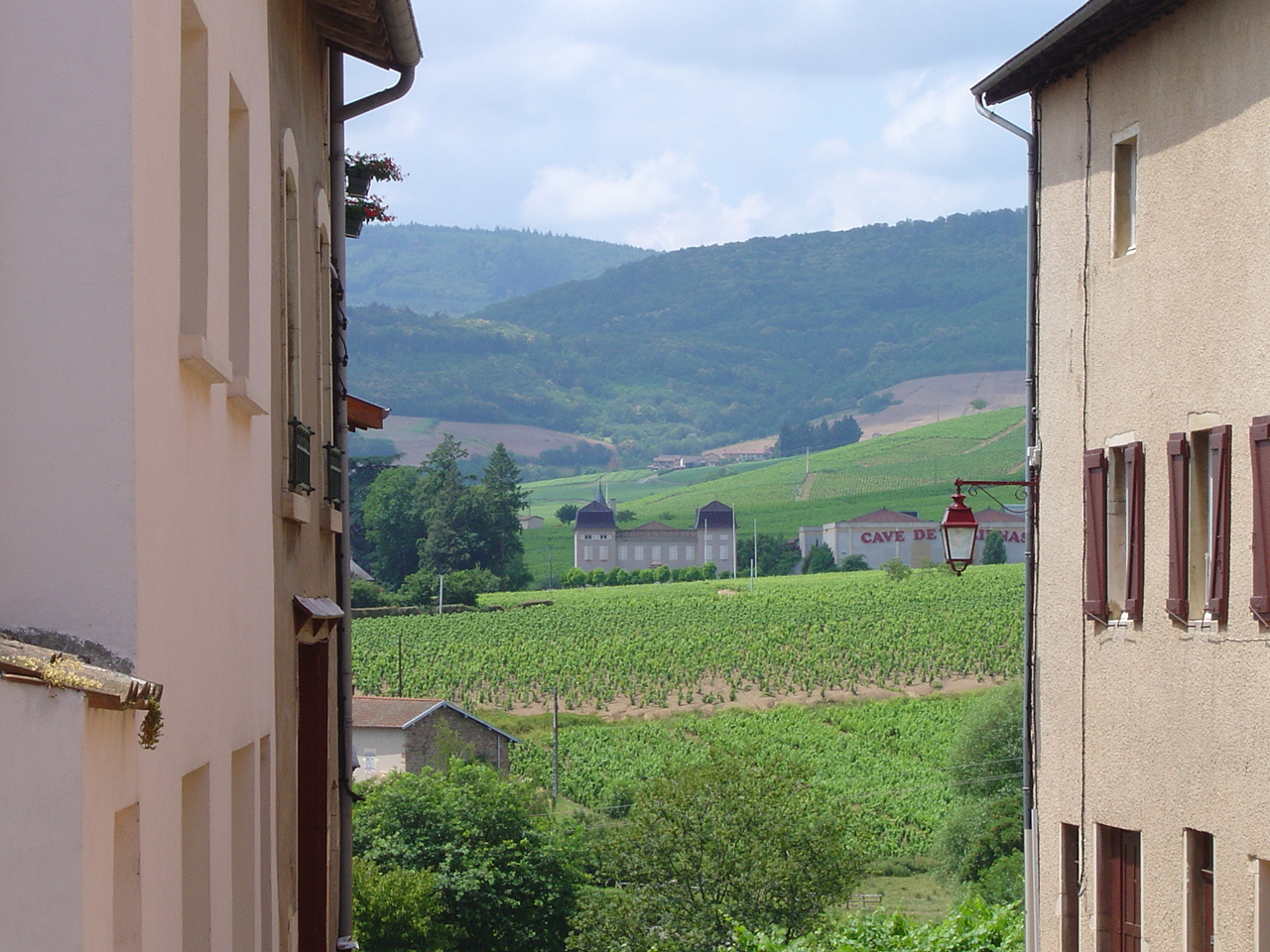
- Official name: Juliénas AOC
- Type: AOC
- Year established: 1938
- Country: France
- Part of: Burgundy
- Sub-regions: Beaujolais
- Soil conditions: granite, schist
- Size of planted vineyards: 580 ha (2010)
- Grapes produced: Gamay, with occasionally a little Aligoté, Chardonnay, and Melon
- Wine produced: red
- Official designation: cru

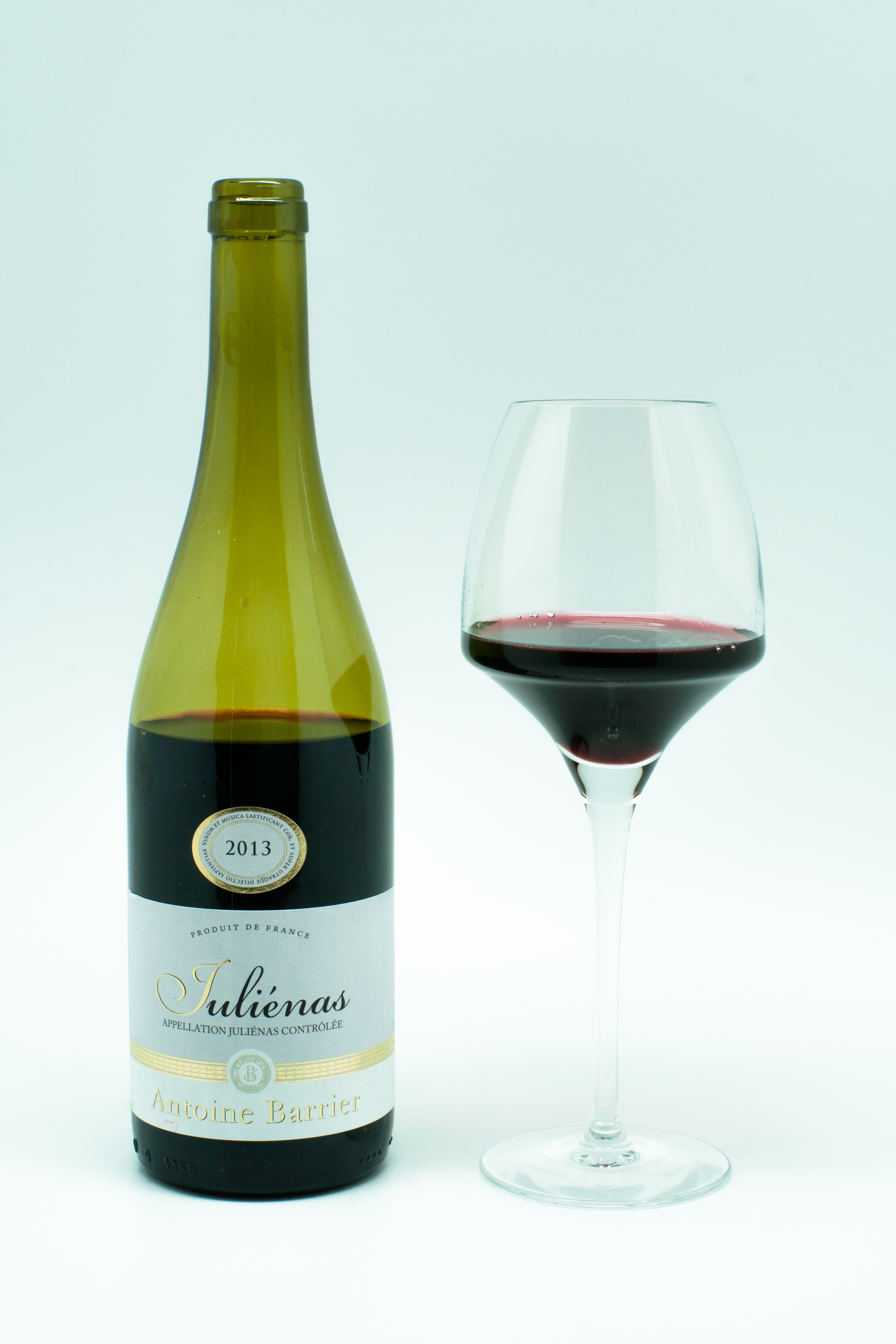
Bottle and glass of Juliénas

Juliénas is a French red wine AOC (controlled designation of origin) produced in the communes of Émeringes, Juliénas, and Jullié in the département of Rhône, and Pruzilly in Saône-et-Loire. The appellation covers the area of Juliénas, and is the most northerly of the Beaujolais crus of which all ten which are located in the northern half of the Beaujolais region. It is located on the north bank of the valley of the Mauvaise, a small tributary of the Saône. Juliénas obtained its AOC on the INAO decree of 11 March 1938. The wine takes its name from Julius Caesar who according to legend, was the source of the names of the communes Juliénas and Jullié, which were founded during his reign (100-44 BCE).

== Geography ==
The vineyard is established on gently sloping hillsides at the bottom and becoming steeper as the ridges are approached. The average altitude varies, starting at 230 metres and reaching 430 metres in the far northwest. The bedrock is granite. This rock has been disaggregated on the surface by erosion resulting in a decomposed pink granite form of rotten rock. The area of Juliénas has one of the most varied soil types in the region and includes schist, diorite, sandstone and some clay. The soil is well drained but poor, an unusual characteristic for the production of quality wines. The vineyard enjoys the same climate as the rest of the Beaujolais region. It exposes its vines to the south-east, but various exposures linked to the hilly terrain create a variety of microclimates partly responsible for the variety of wines found in the appellation. While administratively considered part of the Burgundy wine region, the climate is closer to that of the Rhône, and Beaujolais and its crus are sufficiently individual in character to be considered apart from Burgundy and Rhône.

== Grape varieties ==
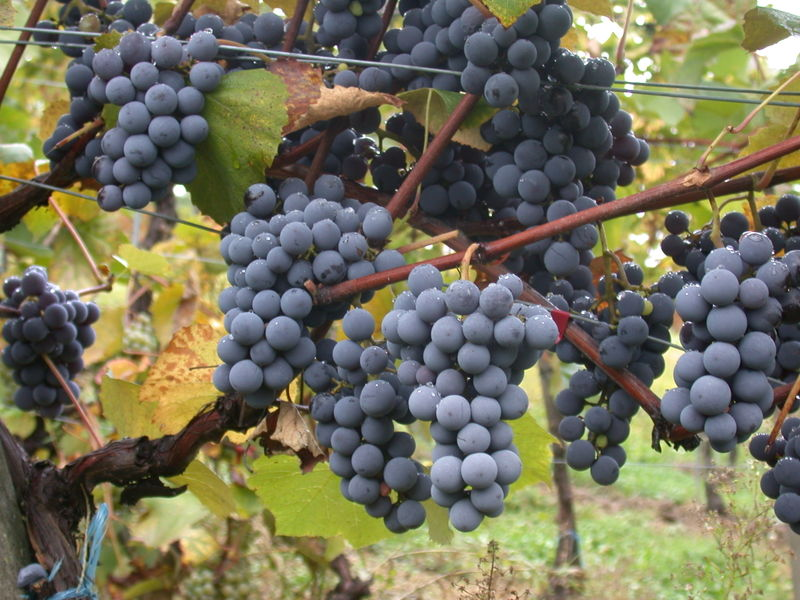
Gamay

The main variety is Gamay Noir à Jus Blanc which has a thin skin and is low in tannins. Three others, Aligoté, Chardonnay, and Melon de Bourgogne are permitted as accessory grape varieties. They are authorized only as a mixture of plants in the vines limited to 15% within each parcel of land.

The land in Juliénas limits the productivity for Gamay. It produces small clusters, guarantee of concentration of the must, therefore of the wine. It is not very vigorous, weak but fertile and whose production needs to be carefully managed because it tends to run out. The best Gamay wines are obtained from acidic and granitic soils. Its early burgeoning also makes it sensitive to spring frosts. It is sometimes sensitive to millerandage when climatic conditions are unfavorable at the time of flowering. Gamay has the advantage of producing a small harvest on the counter-buds. The red of Gamay wine is nuanced with purple highlights. The wines are low in tannins and have a good acidity.

== Harvest ==
The harvest is done by hand, the bunches of grapes must arrive intact in the vats. The first day of the harvest (called the "harvest ban lifting") varies according to the maturity of the berries, which itself depends on the amount of sunshine received: in relatively warm years the grapes are harvested early, in relatively cold years the harvest is later. The maximum permitted yield is 8,000 kg/ha. The natural sugar content of the grape must be at least 180 g/L of must.

The yield is limited to a maximum of 48 hectoliters per hectare; the target yield is 63 hectoliters per hectare. The actual yield is well below the maximum authorized by the specifications, for example the average yield for the entire appellation during the 2010 harvest is 37.3 hectoliters per hectare9.

== Vinification ==
As with all ten Beaujolais crus, especially for those intended to be kept a few more years in the bottle, the vinification is semi-carbonic, halfway between carbonic maceration and traditional Burgundy vinification. The bunches must be as intact as possible, the berries must not be crushed or destemmed. The degree of the finished wines must be at least 10.5% to a permitted maximum of 13% without chaptalisation (added sugar) which is not permitted. Their wines can be more full-bodied, darker in color, and significantly longer-lived than other Beaujolais.

== Tasting ==
The robe of Juliénas is an intense and deep ruby. Its bouquet generally has a fruity and floral character (red fruits, black fruits) and offers a range of subtle aromas of strawberry, cherry and violet, scents of cinnamon, currant and peony and, in some years, peach and blackcurrant. The Juliénas is harmonious, robust, and full-bodied, elegant and seductive with a very good capacity for aging. The wines are at their best from 3 to 5 years but will keep well for 7 years. They are best served at 13 to 15 °C, and like most full bodied reds they accompany roast meat and game.

== Production and commercialisation ==
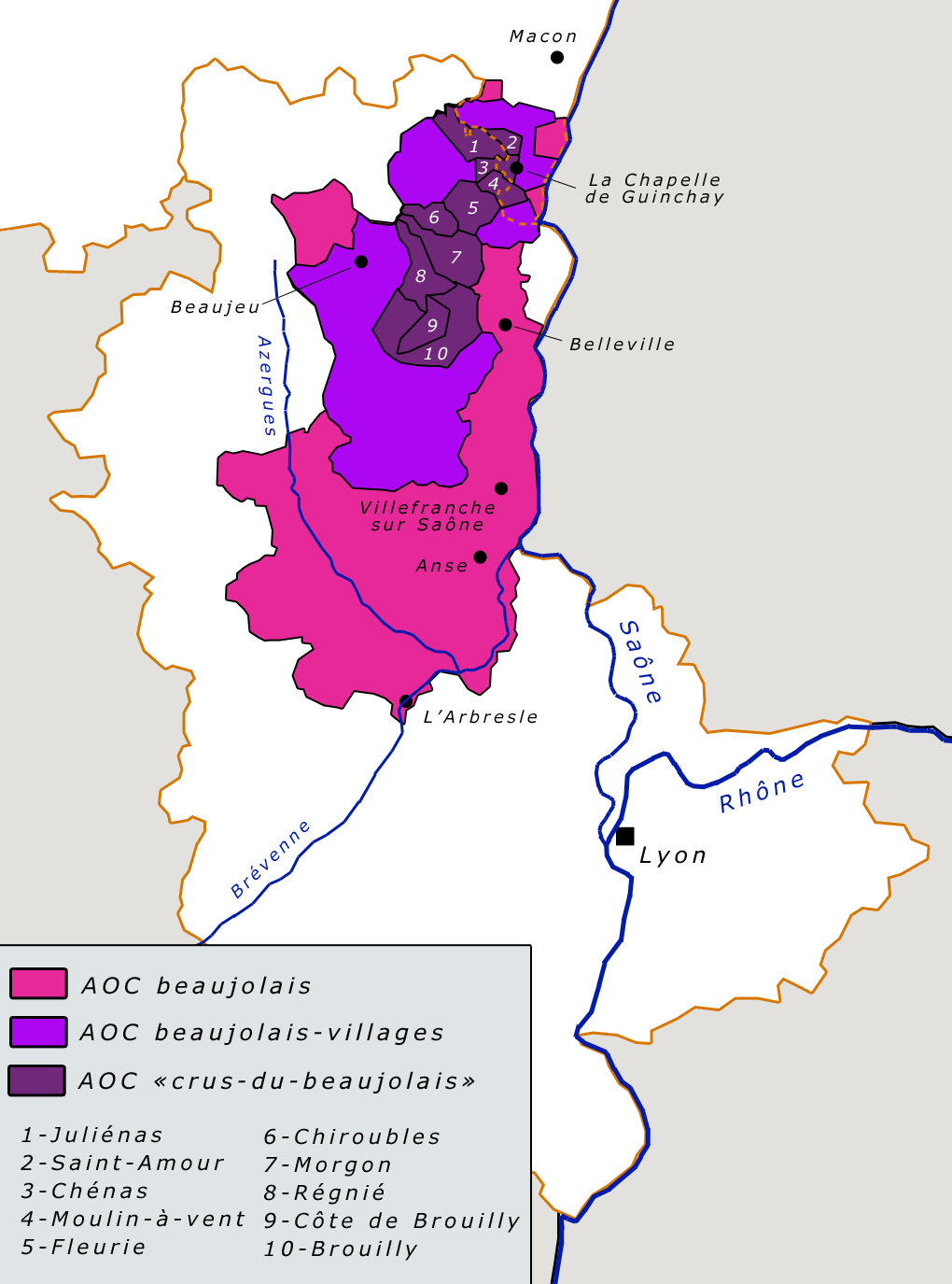
Map of the Beaujolais region showing Juliénas (No.1)

In 2010 some 22 000 hl (2,200,000 litres) were produced. The appellation is produced by 39 wineries, around sixty winegrowers, and about 100 hundred members of the cooperative cellar, who together produce annually approximately 3.5 million bottles. The cooperative accounts for about a quarter of the production. The wines benefiting from the appellation can be folded into the Beaujolais regional appellations (Beaujolais and Beaujolais-Villages), but also Burgundian, and can be marketed under the broader appellations of Burgundy, Burgundy Grand Ordinary, Burgundy ordinary, all-grain Burgundy, and Aligoté Burgundy, (whose production area extends over Beaujolais, according to two decrees of October 16, 2009).

== Crus of Beaujolais ==
North to south:

- Juliénas AOC
- Saint-Amour AOC
- Chénas AOC
- Moulin-à-Vent AOC
- Fleurie AOC
- Chiroubles AOC
- Morgon AOC
- Régnié AOC
- Côte de Brouilly AOC
- Brouilly AOC
