= Saint-Jean-d'Ardières =

- Part of Belleville-en-Beaujolais
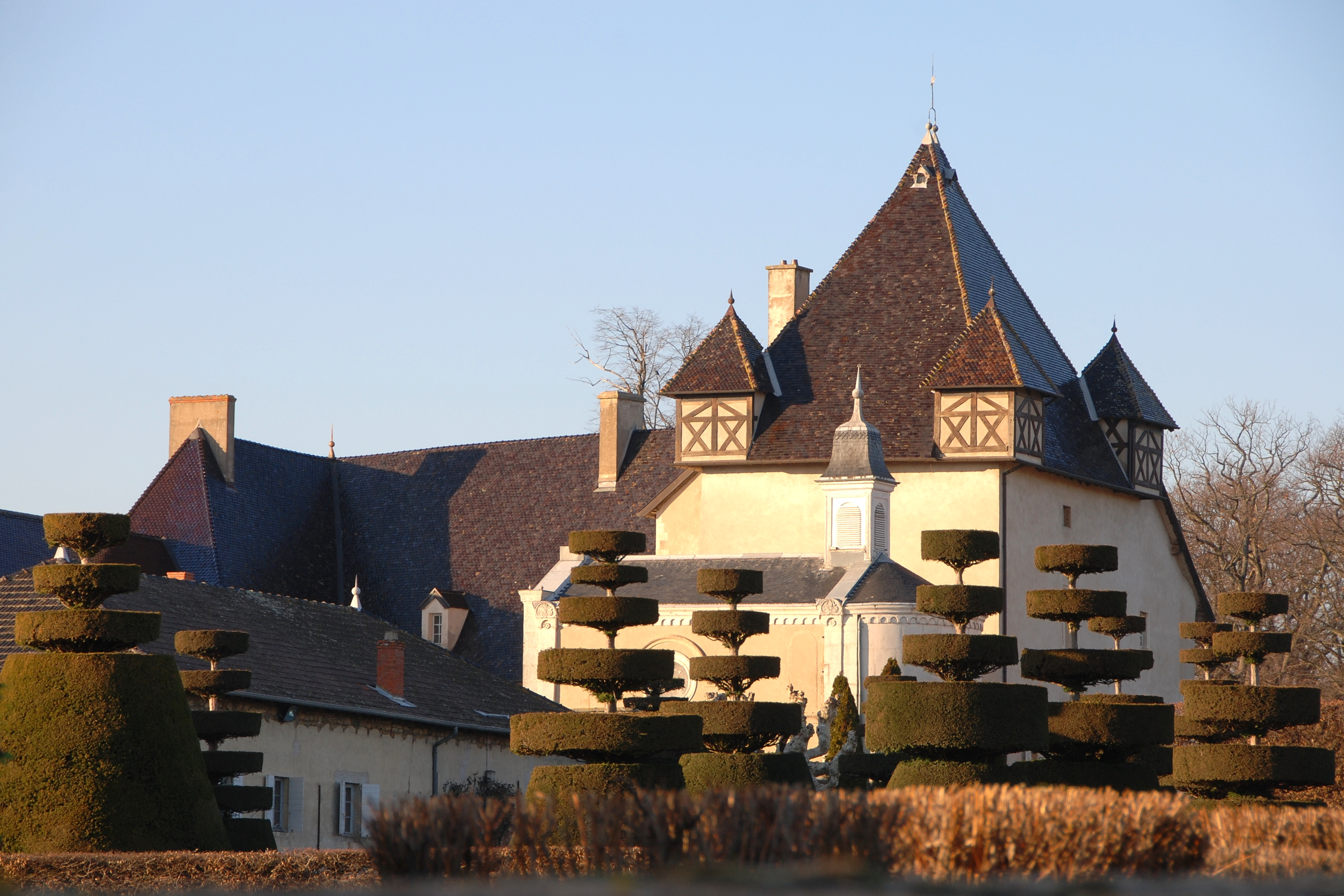
- The Château of Pizay

- Coat of arms
- Location of Saint-Jean-d'Ardières
- Location within France Location within Auvergne-Rhône-Alpes
- Coordinates: 46°07′37″N 4°44′19″E
- Country: France
- Region: Auvergne-Rhône-Alpes
- Department: Rhône
- Arrondissement: Villefranche-sur-Saône
- Canton: Belleville
- Commune: Belleville-en-Beaujolais
- Area^{1}: 12.44 km^{2} (4.80 sq mi)
- Elevation: 190 m (620 ft)
- Highest elevation: 245 m (804 ft)
- Lowest elevation: 172 m (564 ft)
- Population (2022): 5,072
  - Density: 407.7/km^{2} (1,056/sq mi)
- Time zone: UTC+01:00 (CET)
  - Summer (DST): UTC+02:00 (CEST)
- Postal code: 69220
- ^{1} French Land Register data, which excludes lakes, ponds, glaciers > 1 km^{2} (0.386 sq mi or 247 acres) and river estuaries.

Saint-Jean-d'Ardières (French pronunciation: [sɛ̃ ʒɑ̃ daʁdjɛʁ], literally Saint-Jean of Ardières) is a former commune in the Rhône department in eastern France. On 1 January 2019, it was merged into the new commune Belleville-en-Beaujolais.

== See also ==
- Communes of the Rhône department
