= Beaujeu =

Beaujeu may refer to:

== Places in France ==
- Beaujeu, Alpes-de-Haute-Provence, in the Alpes-de-Haute-Provence département
- Beaujeu, Rhône, in the Rhône département
- Beaujeu-Saint-Vallier-Pierrejux-et-Quitteur, in the Haute-Saône département
- Saint-Didier-sur-Beaujeu, in the Rhône département

== People ==
- Agnes of Beaujeu (1200–1231), French noblewoman
- Guillaume de Beaujeu (died 1291), Grand Master of the Knights Templar
- Renaud de Beaujeu (12th–13th century), French author
- Anne of Beaujeu (1461–1522), a French princess and regent for her brother Charles VIII
- Daniel Liénard de Beaujeu (1711–1755), French soldier who fought in the Seven Years' War
- Jacques-Philippe Saveuse de Beaujeu (died 1832), 19th-century Canadian politician
- James de Beaujeu Domville (1933–2015), Canadian theatrical producer and administrator
