= Circea =

Circea may refer to:

- Circe, a figure in Greek mythology
- Circaea, a genus of plants

== See also ==
- Cercié
- Jarzé
