= Serge Mathieu =

French politician (1936–2026)

Member of the French Senate for Rhône
- In office 25 September 1977 – 30 September 2004

Deputy of the French National Assembly for Rhône's 10th constituency
- In office 9 July 1974 – 13 October 1976
- Preceded by: Gérard Ducray
- Succeeded by: André Poutissou

Mayor of Corcelles-en-Beaujolais
- In office March 1971 – June 1995
- Succeeded by: Maurice Maurin

Personal details
- Born: 10 February 1936 Crest, France
- Died: 14 March 2026 (aged 90)
- Party: RI; UMP
- Occupation: Winemaker

Serge Mathieu (French: [sˈɛʁʒ matjˈø]; 10 February 1936 – 14 March 2026) was a French politician of the Independent Republicans (RI) and the Union for a Popular Movement (UMP).

Mathieu served as mayor of Corcelles-en-Beaujolais from 1971 to 1995 and was substitute deputy in the National Assembly for Gérard Ducray, where he served after Ducray's appointment as Secretary of State for Tourism. He was then elected to the Senate in 1977, where he served until 2004.

Mathieu died on 14 March 2026, at the age of 90.
