= Saint-Étienne-la-Varenne =

- Commune
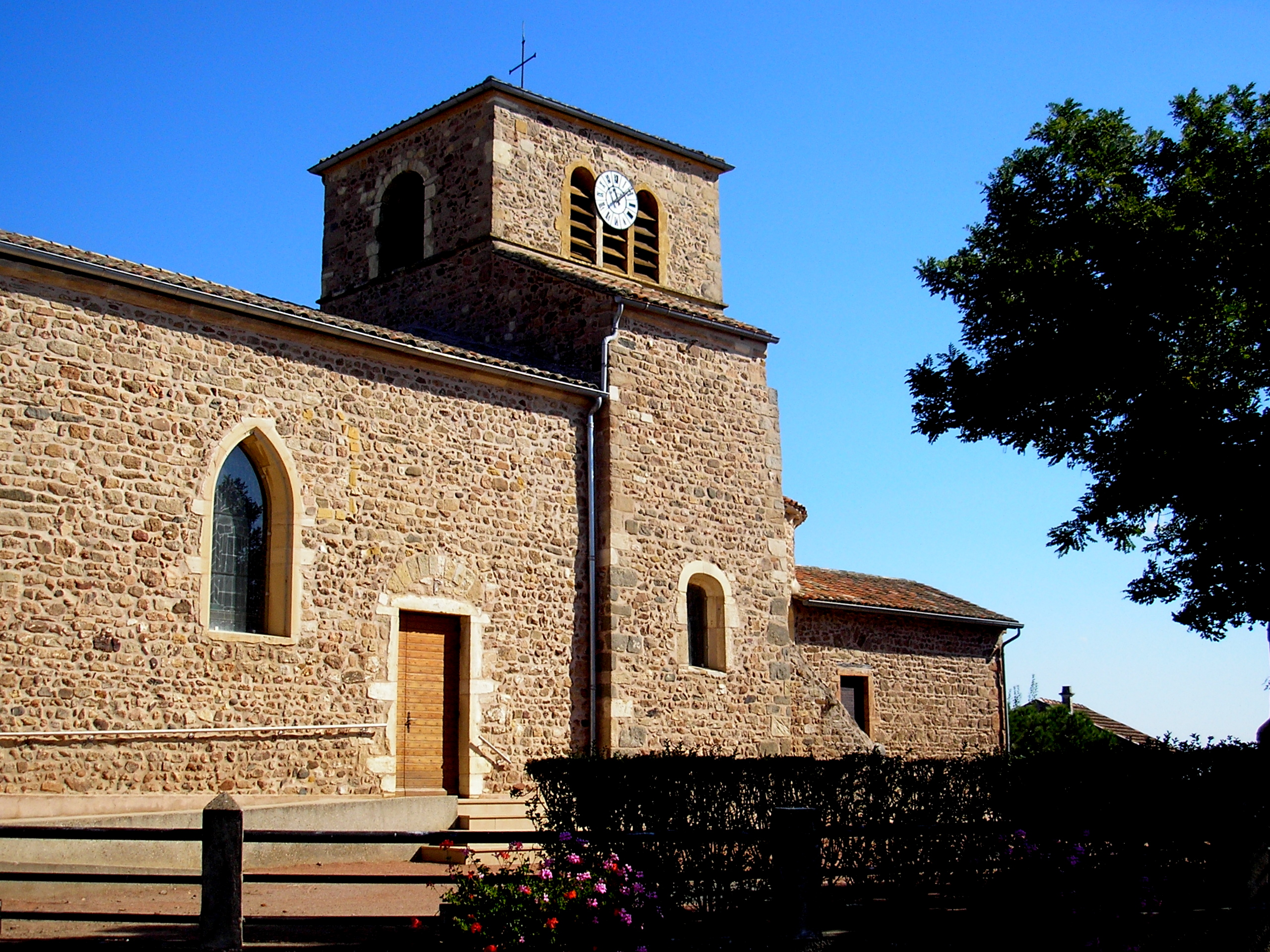
- The church in Saint-Étienne-la-Varenne
- Location of Saint-Étienne-la-Varenne
- Location within France Location within Auvergne-Rhône-Alpes
- Coordinates: 46°04′39″N 4°37′53″E
- Country: France
- Region: Auvergne-Rhône-Alpes
- Department: Rhône
- Arrondissement: Villefranche-sur-Saône
- Canton: Belleville-en-Beaujolais
- Intercommunality: Saône-Beaujolais

Government
  - Mayor (2020–2026): Daniel Basset
- Area^{1}: 6.96 km^{2} (2.69 sq mi)
- Elevation: 400 m (1,300 ft)
- Highest elevation: 620 m (2,030 ft)
- Lowest elevation: 278 m (912 ft)
- Population (2023): 784
  - Density: 113/km^{2} (292/sq mi)
- Time zone: UTC+01:00 (CET)
  - Summer (DST): UTC+02:00 (CEST)
- INSEE/Postal code: 69198 /69460
- ^{1} French Land Register data, which excludes lakes, ponds, glaciers > 1 km^{2} (0.386 sq mi or 247 acres) and river estuaries.

Saint-Étienne-la-Varenne (French pronunciation: [sɛ̃.t‿etjɛn la vaʁɛn]) is a commune in the Rhône department in eastern France.

== See also ==
- Communes of the Rhône department
