= Arrondissement of Villefranche-sur-Saône =

Coordinates: 45°59′20″N 4°43′25″E

Villefranche-sur-Saône
- Arrondissement
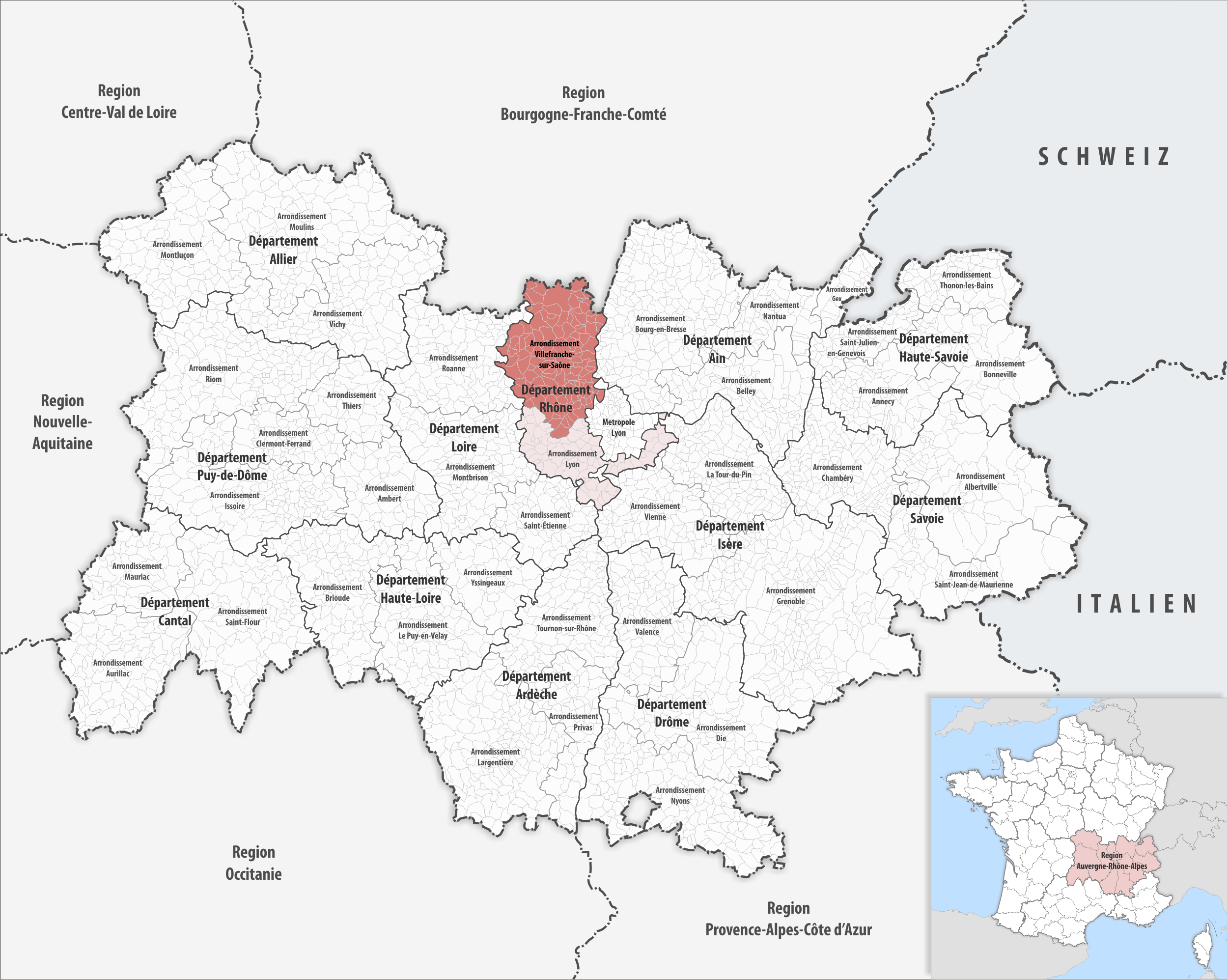
- Location within the region Auvergne-Rhône-Alpes
- Country: France
- Region: Auvergne-Rhône-Alpes
- Department: Rhône
- No. of communes: {{{nbcomm}}}
- Area: 1,714.6 km^{2} (662.0 sq mi)
- Population (2023): 261,266
  - Density: 152.38/km^{2} (394.66/sq mi)
- INSEE code: 692

The arrondissement of Villefranche-sur-Saône is an arrondissement of France in the Rhône department in the Auvergne-Rhône-Alpes region. It has 132 communes. Its population is 255,865 (2021), and its area is 1,714.6 km^{2} (662.0 sq mi).

== Composition ==
The communes of the arrondissement of Villefranche-sur-Saône are:

1. Affoux (69001)
2. Aigueperse (69002)
3. Alix (69004)
4. Ambérieux (69005)
5. Amplepuis (69006)
6. Ancy (69008)
7. Anse (69009)
8. L'Arbresle (69010)
9. Les Ardillats (69012)
10. Arnas (69013)
11. Azolette (69016)
12. Bagnols (69017)
13. Beaujeu (69018)
14. Belleville-en-Beaujolais (69019)
15. Belmont-d'Azergues (69020)
16. Bessenay (69021)
17. Bibost (69022)
18. Blacé (69023)
19. Le Breuil (69026)
20. Bully (69032)
21. Cenves (69035)
22. Cercié (69036)
23. Chambost-Allières (69037)
24. Chamelet (69039)
25. Charentay (69045)
26. Charnay (69047)
27. Chasselay (69049)
28. Châtillon (69050)
29. Chazay-d'Azergues (69052)
30. Chénas (69053)
31. Chénelette (69054)
32. Les Chères (69055)
33. Chessy (69056)
34. Chevinay (69057)
35. Chiroubles (69058)
36. Civrieux-d'Azergues (69059)
37. Claveisolles (69060)
38. Cogny (69061)
39. Corcelles-en-Beaujolais (69065)
40. Cours (69066)
41. Courzieu (69067)
42. Cublize (69070)
43. Denicé (69074)
44. Deux-Grosnes (69135)
45. Dième (69075)
46. Dommartin (69076)
47. Dracé (69077)
48. Émeringes (69082)
49. Éveux (69083)
50. Fleurie (69084)
51. Fleurieux-sur-l'Arbresle (69086)
52. Frontenas (69090)
53. Gleizé (69092)
54. Grandris (69093)
55. Joux (69102)
56. Juliénas (69103)
57. Jullié (69104)
58. Lacenas (69105)
59. Lachassagne (69106)
60. Lamure-sur-Azergues (69107)
61. Lancié (69108)
62. Lantignié (69109)
63. Légny (69111)
64. Lentilly (69112)
65. Létra (69113)
66. Limas (69115)
67. Lozanne (69121)
68. Lucenay (69122)
69. Marchampt (69124)
70. Marcilly-d'Azergues (69125)
71. Marcy (69126)
72. Meaux-la-Montagne (69130)
73. Moiré (69134)
74. Montmelas-Saint-Sorlin (69137)
75. Morancé (69140)
76. Odenas (69145)
77. Le Perréon (69151)
78. Pommiers (69156)
79. Porte des Pierres Dorées (69159)
80. Poule-les-Écharmeaux (69160)
81. Propières (69161)
82. Quincié-en-Beaujolais (69162)
83. Ranchal (69164)
84. Régnié-Durette (69165)
85. Rivolet (69167)
86. Ronno (69169)
87. Sain-Bel (69171)
88. Saint-Appolinaire (69181)
89. Saint-Bonnet-des-Bruyères (69182)
90. Saint-Bonnet-le-Troncy (69183)
91. Saint-Clément-de-Vers (69186)
92. Saint-Clément-sur-Valsonne (69188)
93. Saint-Cyr-le-Chatoux (69192)
94. Saint-Didier-sur-Beaujeu (69196)
95. Sainte-Paule (69230)
96. Saint-Étienne-des-Oullières (69197)
97. Saint-Étienne-la-Varenne (69198)
98. Saint-Forgeux (69200)
99. Saint-Georges-de-Reneins (69206)
100. Saint-Germain-Nuelles (69208)
101. Saint-Igny-de-Vers (69209)
102. Saint-Jean-des-Vignes (69212)
103. Saint-Jean-la-Bussière (69214)
104. Saint-Julien (69215)
105. Saint-Julien-sur-Bibost (69216)
106. Saint-Just-d'Avray (69217)
107. Saint-Lager (69218)
108. Saint-Marcel-l'Éclairé (69225)
109. Saint-Nizier-d'Azergues (69229)
110. Saint-Pierre-la-Palud (69231)
111. Saint-Romain-de-Popey (69234)
112. Saint-Vérand (69239)
113. Saint-Vincent-de-Reins (69240)
114. Salles-Arbuissonnas-en-Beaujolais (69172)
115. Sarcey (69173)
116. Les Sauvages (69174)
117. Savigny (69175)
118. Sourcieux-les-Mines (69177)
119. Taponas (69242)
120. Tarare (69243)
121. Ternand (69245)
122. Theizé (69246)
123. Thizy-les-Bourgs (69248)
124. Val d'Oingt (69024)
125. Valsonne (69254)
126. Vaux-en-Beaujolais (69257)
127. Vauxrenard (69258)
128. Vernay (69261)
129. Villefranche-sur-Saône (69264)
130. Ville-sur-Jarnioux (69265)
131. Villié-Morgon (69267)
132. Vindry-sur-Turdine (69157)

== History ==
The arrondissement of Villefranche-sur-Saône was created in 1800. On 1 January 2015, 101 communes that did not join the newly- created Metropolis of Lyon passed from the arrondissement of Lyon to the arrondissement of Villefranche-sur-Saône. On 1 February 2017, 78 communes passed from the arrondissement of Villefranche-sur-Saône to the arrondissement of Lyon.

As a result of the reorganisation of the cantons of France which came into effect in 2015, the borders of the cantons are no longer related to the borders of the arrondissements. The cantons of the arrondissement of Villefranche-sur-Saône were, as of January 2015:

1. Amplepuis
2. Anse
3. Beaujeu
4. Belleville
5. Le Bois-d'Oingt
6. Gleizé
7. Lamure-sur-Azergues
8. Monsols
9. Tarare
10. Thizy-les-Bourgs
11. Villefranche-sur-Saône
