= Belleville-en-Beaujolais =

- Commune
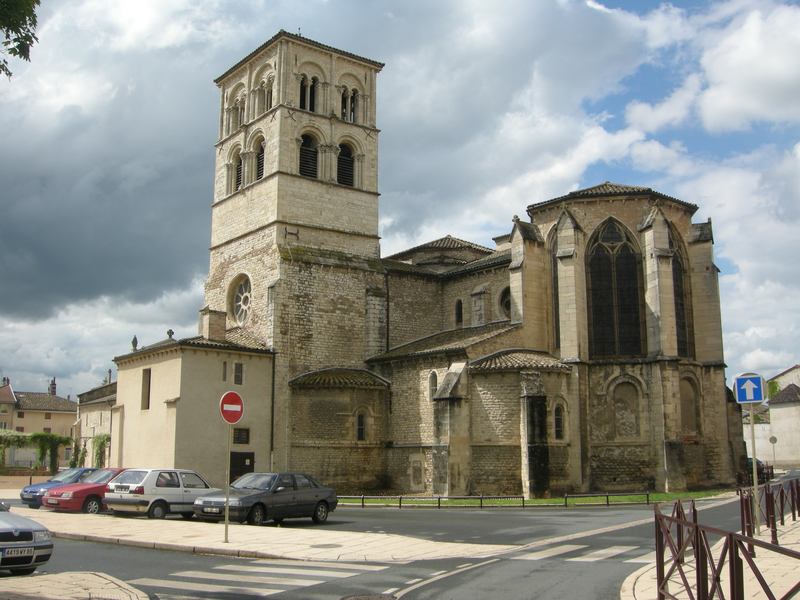
- The church of Our Lady, in Belleville
- Location of Belleville-en-Beaujolais
- Location within France Location within Auvergne-Rhône-Alpes
- Coordinates: 46°06′34″N 4°45′00″E
- Country: France
- Region: Auvergne-Rhône-Alpes
- Department: Rhône
- Arrondissement: Villefranche-sur-Saône
- Canton: Belleville-en-Beaujolais
- Intercommunality: Saône Beaujolais

Government
  - Mayor (2020–2026): Frédéric Pronchery
- Area^{1}: 22.86 km^{2} (8.83 sq mi)
- Highest elevation: 245 m (804 ft)
- Lowest elevation: 169 m (554 ft)
- Population (2023): 14,016
  - Density: 613.1/km^{2} (1,588/sq mi)
- Time zone: UTC+01:00 (CET)
  - Summer (DST): UTC+02:00 (CEST)
- INSEE/Postal code: 69019 /69220
- ^{1} French Land Register data, which excludes lakes, ponds, glaciers > 1 km^{2} (0.386 sq mi or 247 acres) and river estuaries.

Belleville-en-Beaujolais (French pronunciation: [bɛlvil ɑ̃ boʒɔlɛ], literally Belleville in Beaujolais) is a commune of the Rhône department in eastern France. It was established on 1 January 2019 by merger of the former communes of Belleville (the seat) and Saint-Jean-d'Ardières.

== Population ==
Populations of the area corresponding with the commune of Belleville-en-Beaujolais at 1 January 2025.

Historical population
Year	Pop.	±% p.a.
1968	7,169	—
1975	7,929	+1.45%
1982	8,390	+0.81%
1990	8,124	−0.40%
1999	8,115	−0.01%
2007	10,038	+2.69%
2012	11,774	+3.24%
2017	12,971	+1.96%
2023	14,016	+1.30%
Source: INSEE

== See also ==
Communes of the Rhône department
