= Chénas =

- Commune
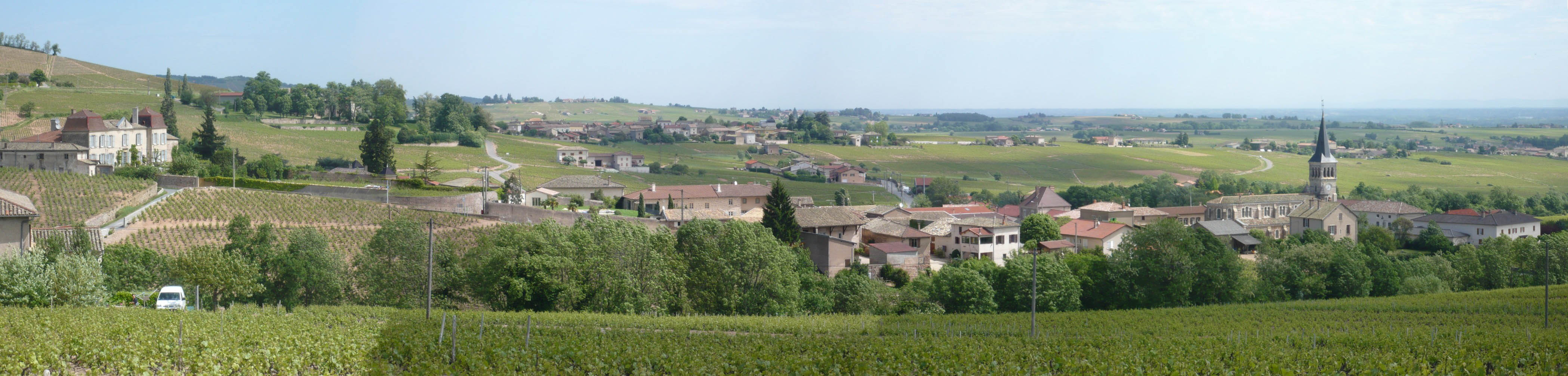
- A panoramic view of Chénas
- Location of Chénas
- Location within France Location within Auvergne-Rhône-Alpes
- Coordinates: 46°12′47″N 4°43′13″E
- Country: France
- Region: Auvergne-Rhône-Alpes
- Department: Rhône
- Arrondissement: Villefranche-sur-Saône
- Canton: Belleville-en-Beaujolais
- Intercommunality: Saône-Beaujolais

Government
  - Mayor (2020–2026): Jacques Duchet
- Area^{1}: 8.18 km^{2} (3.16 sq mi)
- Elevation: 250 m (820 ft)
- Highest elevation: 515 m (1,690 ft)
- Lowest elevation: 215 m (705 ft)
- Population (2023): 533
  - Density: 65.2/km^{2} (169/sq mi)
- Time zone: UTC+01:00 (CET)
  - Summer (DST): UTC+02:00 (CEST)
- INSEE/Postal code: 69053 /69840
- ^{1} French Land Register data, which excludes lakes, ponds, glaciers > 1 km^{2} (0.386 sq mi or 247 acres) and river estuaries.

Chénas is a commune in the Rhône department in eastern France.

== See also ==
- Chénas AOC
- Communes of the Rhône department
