= Chiroubles =

- Commune
- Location of Chiroubles
- Location within France Location within Auvergne-Rhône-Alpes
- Coordinates: 46°10′52″N 4°39′54″E
- Country: France
- Region: Auvergne-Rhône-Alpes
- Department: Rhône
- Arrondissement: Villefranche-sur-Saône
- Canton: Belleville-en-Beaujolais
- Intercommunality: Saône-Beaujolais

Government
  - Mayor (2023–2026): Franck Brunel
- Area^{1}: 7.38 km^{2} (2.85 sq mi)
- Highest elevation: 454 m (1,490 ft)
- Lowest elevation: 290 m (950 ft)
- Population (2023): 434
  - Density: 58.8/km^{2} (152/sq mi)
- Time zone: UTC+01:00 (CET)
  - Summer (DST): UTC+02:00 (CEST)
- INSEE/Postal code: 69058 /69115
- ^{1} French Land Register data, which excludes lakes, ponds, glaciers > 1 km^{2} (0.386 sq mi or 247 acres) and river estuaries.

Chiroubles (French pronunciation: [ʃiʁubl]) is a commune in the Rhône department in eastern France.

== See also ==
- Chiroubles AOC, a Beaujolais wine from Chiroubles
- Communes of the Rhône department
