= Fleurie =

- Commune
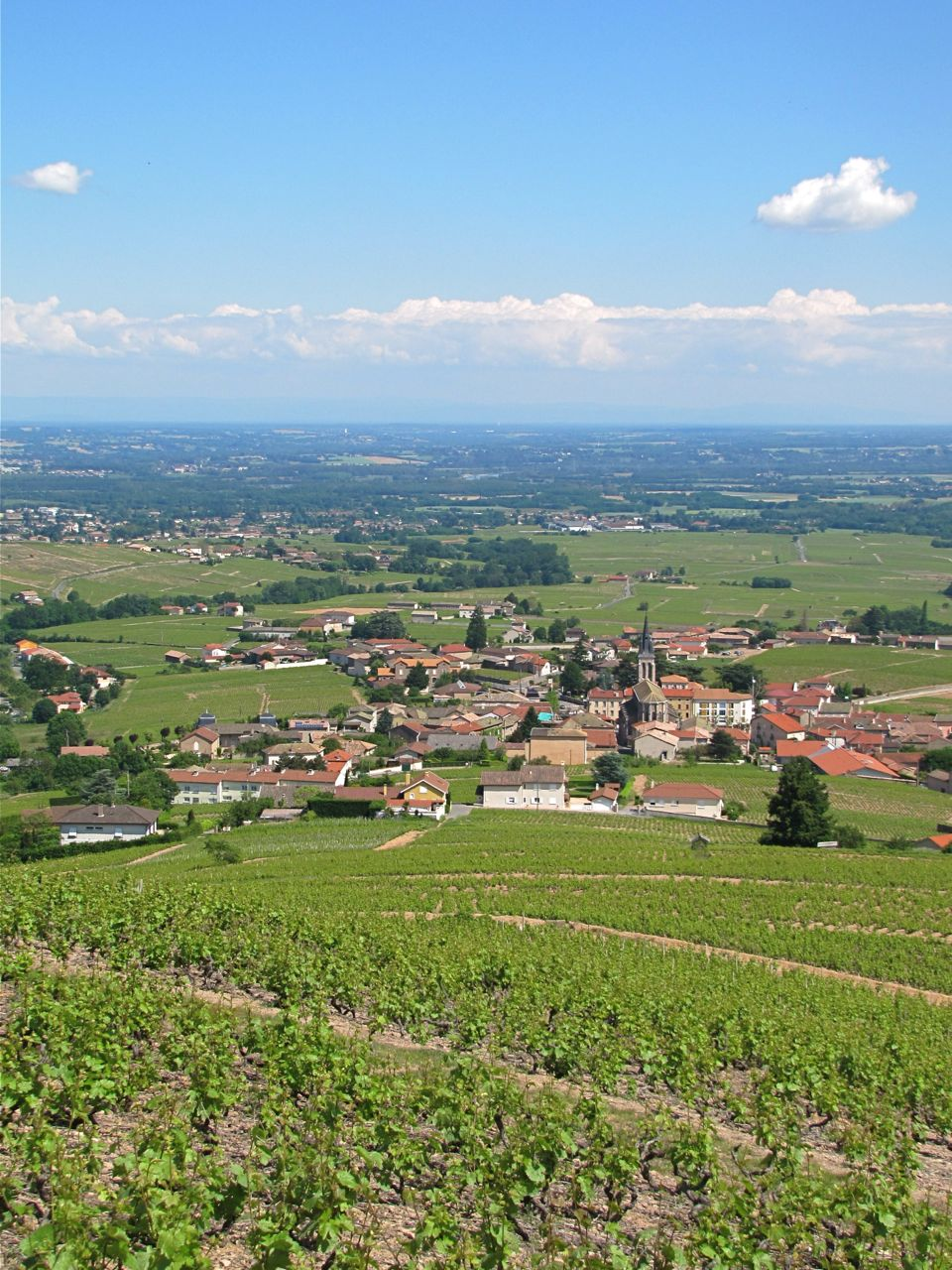
- A general view of Fleurie
- Location of Fleurie
- Location within France Location within Auvergne-Rhône-Alpes
- Coordinates: 46°11′35″N 4°41′53″E
- Country: France
- Region: Auvergne-Rhône-Alpes
- Department: Rhône
- Arrondissement: Villefranche-sur-Saône
- Canton: Belleville-en-Beaujolais

Government
  - Mayor (2020–2026): Frédéric Miguet
- Area^{1}: 13.94 km^{2} (5.38 sq mi)
- Elevation: 300 m (980 ft)
- Highest elevation: 524 m (1,719 ft)
- Lowest elevation: 210 m (690 ft)
- Population (2023): 1,382
  - Density: 99.14/km^{2} (256.8/sq mi)
- Time zone: UTC+01:00 (CET)
  - Summer (DST): UTC+02:00 (CEST)
- INSEE/Postal code: 69084 /69820
- ^{1} French Land Register data, which excludes lakes, ponds, glaciers > 1 km^{2} (0.386 sq mi or 247 acres) and river estuaries.

Fleurie (French pronunciation: [fløʁi]) is a commune in the Rhône department in eastern France.

Medieval charters record Fleurie as Floriacum.

Fleurie AOC is a division of the Beaujolais wine region.

== Notable residents ==
In the 1970s the British Conservative politician and tax fugitive Ernest Marples (1907–78) owned a Fleurie château and vineyard, to which he retired after fleeing from an Inland Revenue investigation in 1975.

- Désiré Charnay (1828–1915), an archaeologist specializing in Mayan and Aztec studies

== See also ==
- Communes of the Rhône department
