= Villié-Morgon =

- Commune
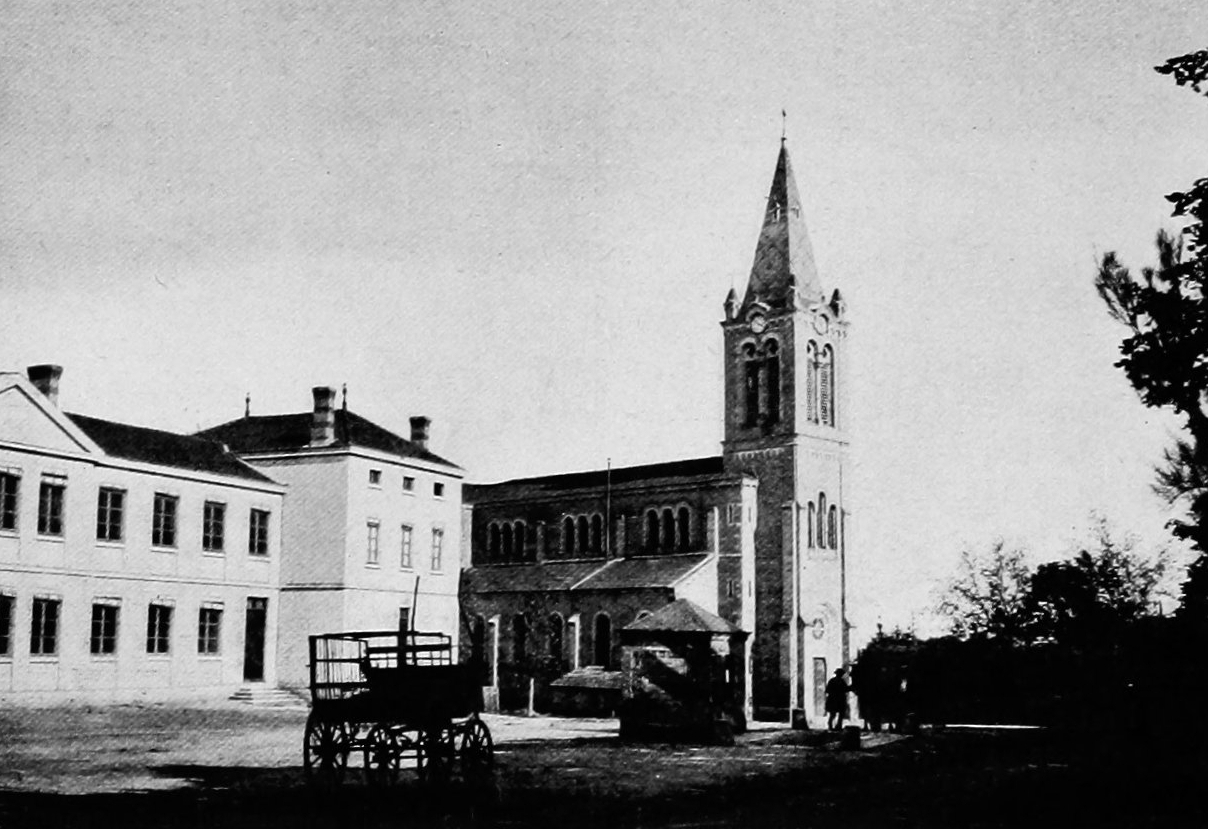
- Villié-Morgon in the early 20th century
- Location of Villié-Morgon
- Location within France Location within Auvergne-Rhône-Alpes
- Coordinates: 46°09′47″N 4°40′53″E
- Country: France
- Region: Auvergne-Rhône-Alpes
- Department: Rhône
- Arrondissement: Villefranche-sur-Saône
- Canton: Belleville-en-Beaujolais

Government
  - Mayor (2020–2026): Thierry Lamure
- Area^{1}: 18.74 km^{2} (7.24 sq mi)
- Elevation: 260 m (850 ft)
- Highest elevation: 689 m (2,260 ft)
- Lowest elevation: 212 m (696 ft)
- Population (2023): 2,148
  - Density: 114.6/km^{2} (296.9/sq mi)
- Time zone: UTC+01:00 (CET)
  - Summer (DST): UTC+02:00 (CEST)
- INSEE/Postal code: 69267 /69910
- ^{1} French Land Register data, which excludes lakes, ponds, glaciers > 1 km^{2} (0.386 sq mi or 247 acres) and river estuaries.

Villié-Morgon (French pronunciation: [vilje mɔʁɡɔ̃]) is a commune in the eastern French department of Rhône.

== Population ==
Historical population
Year	Pop.	±% p.a.
1968	1,586	—
1975	1,551	−0.32%
1982	1,516	−0.33%
1990	1,522	+0.05%
1999	1,614	+0.65%
2007	1,792	+1.32%
2012	2,013	+2.35%
2017	2,111	+0.96%
2023	2,148	+0.29%
Source: INSEE

== Twins cities ==
- (Germany) Sasbachwalden

== See also ==
- Communes of the Rhône department
