= Dracé =

- Commune
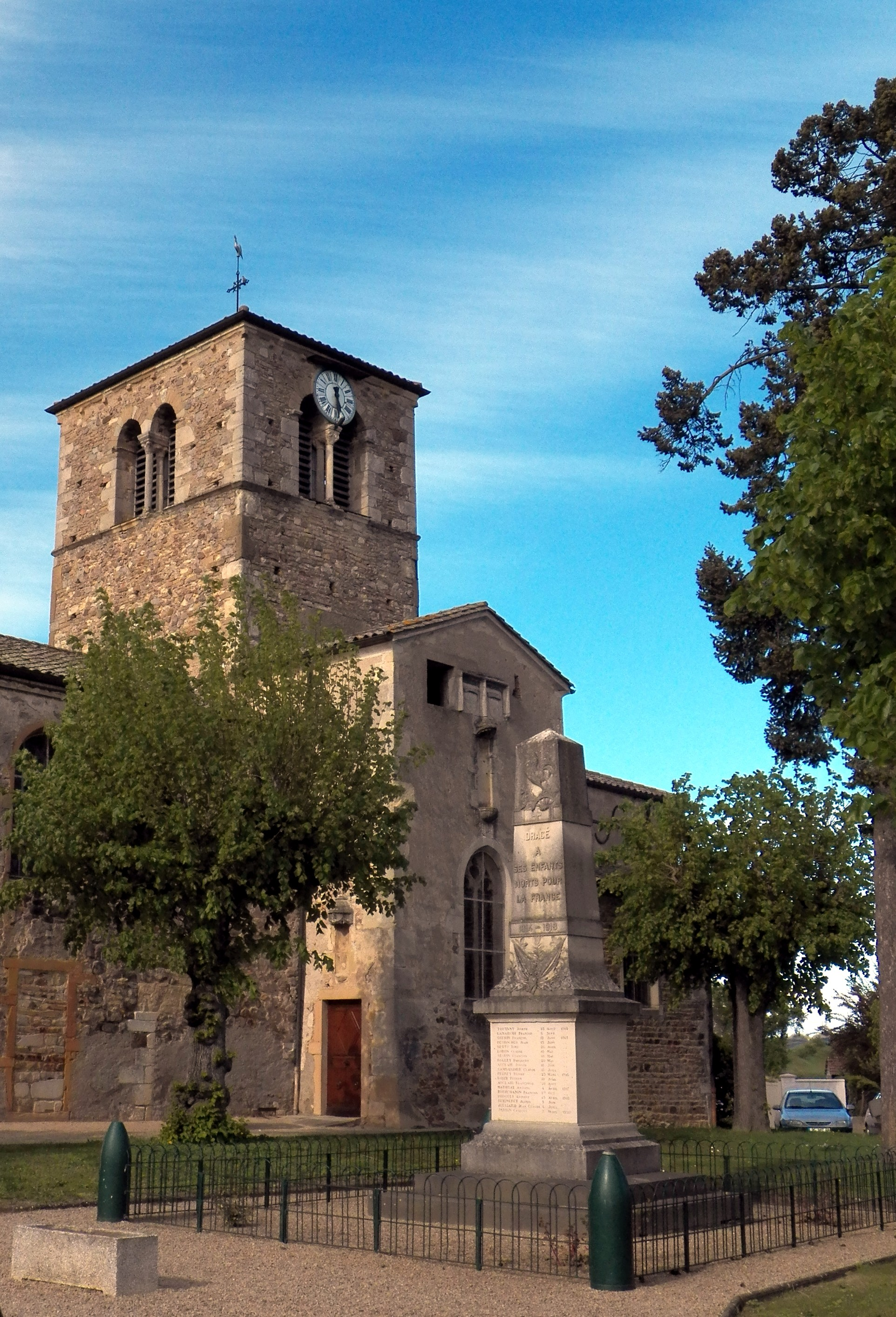
- The war memorial and the church in Dracé

- Coat of arms
- Location of Dracé
- Location within France Location within Auvergne-Rhône-Alpes
- Coordinates: 46°09′27″N 4°45′58″E
- Country: France
- Region: Auvergne-Rhône-Alpes
- Department: Rhône
- Arrondissement: Villefranche-sur-Saône
- Canton: Belleville-en-Beaujolais
- Intercommunality: Saône-Beaujolais

Government
  - Mayor (2020–2026): Christian Bettu
- Area^{1}: 14.87 km^{2} (5.74 sq mi)
- Elevation: 183 m (600 ft)
- Highest elevation: 188 m (617 ft)
- Lowest elevation: 168 m (551 ft)
- Population (2023): 1,212
  - Density: 81.51/km^{2} (211.1/sq mi)
- Time zone: UTC+01:00 (CET)
  - Summer (DST): UTC+02:00 (CEST)
- INSEE/Postal code: 69077 /69220
- ^{1} French Land Register data, which excludes lakes, ponds, glaciers > 1 km^{2} (0.386 sq mi or 247 acres) and river estuaries.

Dracé (French pronunciation: [dʁase]) is a commune in the Rhône department in eastern France.

== See also ==
- Communes of the Rhône department
