= Vauxrenard =

- Commune
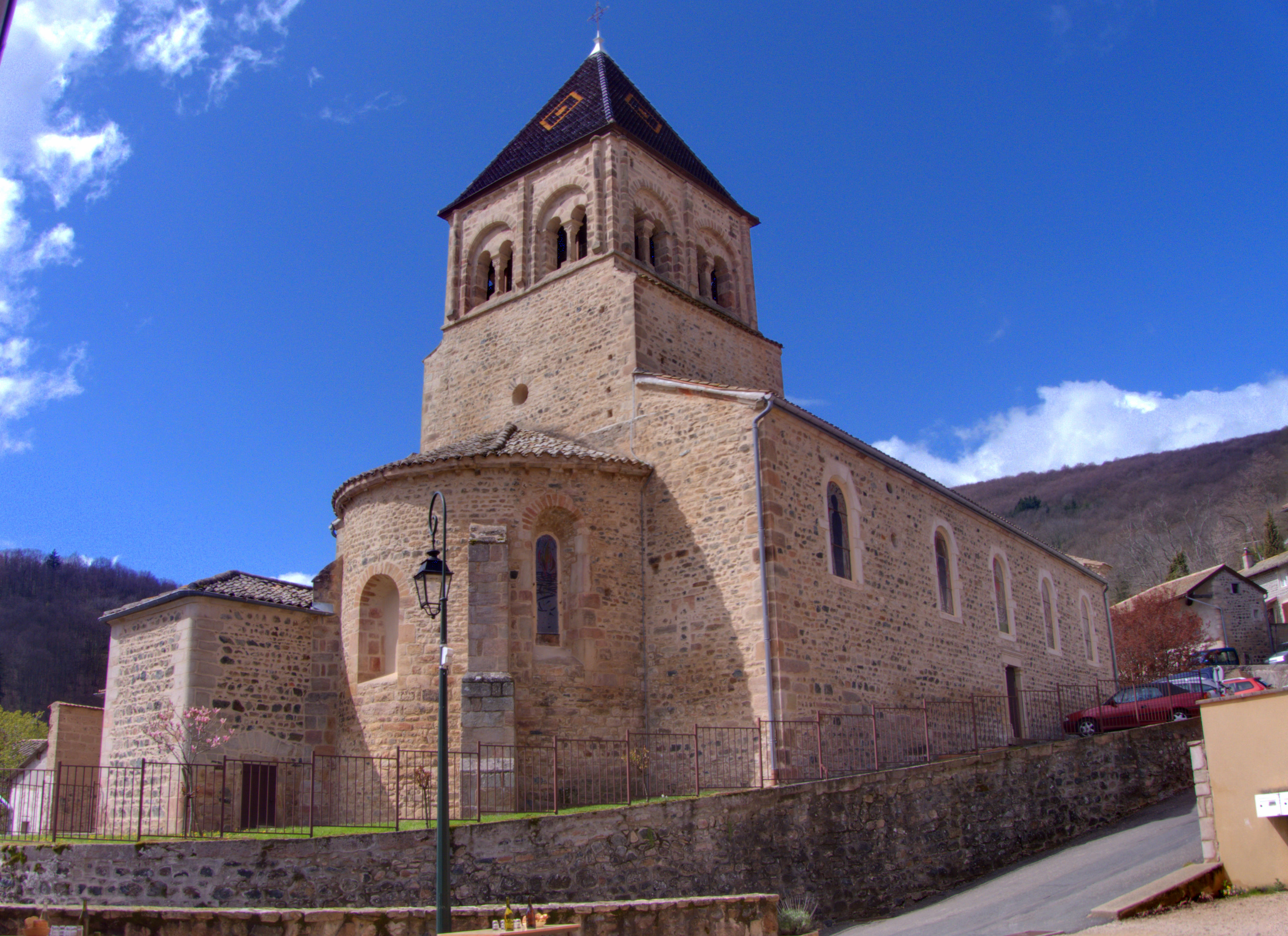
- The church in Vauxrenard
- Location of Vauxrenard
- Location within France Location within Auvergne-Rhône-Alpes
- Coordinates: 46°12′37″N 4°38′42″E
- Country: France
- Region: Auvergne-Rhône-Alpes
- Department: Rhône
- Arrondissement: Villefranche-sur-Saône
- Canton: Belleville-en-Beaujolais
- Area^{1}: 19.19 km^{2} (7.41 sq mi)
- Elevation: 525 m (1,722 ft)
- Highest elevation: 844 m (2,769 ft)
- Lowest elevation: 294 m (965 ft)
- Population (2023): 311
  - Density: 16.2/km^{2} (42.0/sq mi)
- Time zone: UTC+01:00 (CET)
  - Summer (DST): UTC+02:00 (CEST)
- INSEE/Postal code: 69258 /69820
- ^{1} French Land Register data, which excludes lakes, ponds, glaciers > 1 km^{2} (0.386 sq mi or 247 acres) and river estuaries.

Vauxrenard is a commune in the Rhône department in eastern France.

== See also ==
- Communes of the Rhône department
