= Odenas =

- Commune
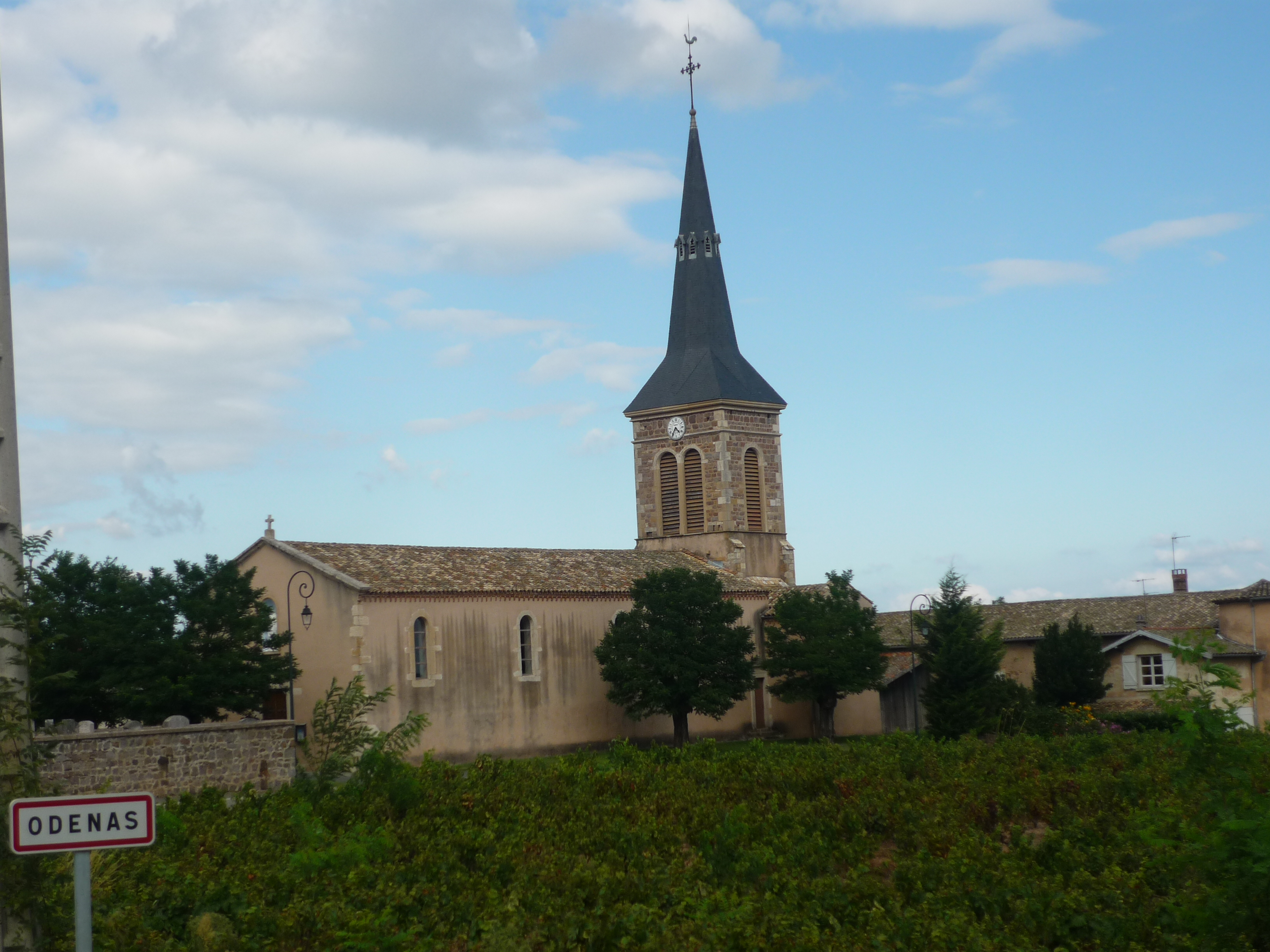
- The church of Odenas
- Location of Odenas
- Location within France Location within Auvergne-Rhône-Alpes
- Coordinates: 46°05′19″N 4°38′51″E
- Country: France
- Region: Auvergne-Rhône-Alpes
- Department: Rhône
- Arrondissement: Villefranche-sur-Saône
- Canton: Belleville-en-Beaujolais
- Intercommunality: Saône Beaujolais

Government
  - Mayor (2020–2026): Evelyne Geoffray
- Area^{1}: 9.02 km^{2} (3.48 sq mi)
- Elevation: 280 m (920 ft)
- Highest elevation: 622 m (2,041 ft)
- Lowest elevation: 232 m (761 ft)
- Population (2023): 938
  - Density: 104/km^{2} (269/sq mi)
- Time zone: UTC+01:00 (CET)
  - Summer (DST): UTC+02:00 (CEST)
- INSEE/Postal code: 69145 /69460
- ^{1} French Land Register data, which excludes lakes, ponds, glaciers > 1 km^{2} (0.386 sq mi or 247 acres) and river estuaries.

Odenas is a commune in the Rhône department in eastern France.

== See also ==
- Communes of the Rhône department
