= Cenves =

- Commune
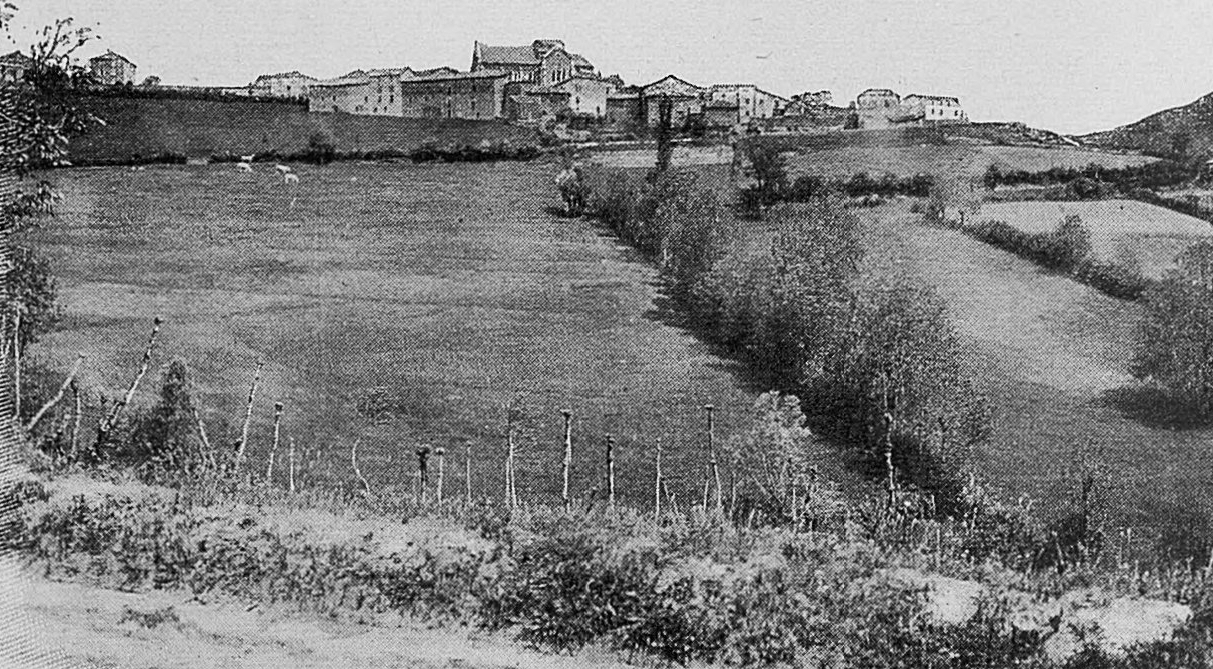
- Cenves at the beginning of the 20th century
- Location of Cenves
- Location within France Location within Auvergne-Rhône-Alpes
- Coordinates: 46°16′17″N 4°38′51″E
- Country: France
- Region: Auvergne-Rhône-Alpes
- Department: Rhône
- Arrondissement: Villefranche-sur-Saône
- Canton: Belleville-en-Beaujolais
- Intercommunality: Saône-Beaujolais

Government
  - Mayor (2020–2026): Pierre-Yves Pelle-Boudon
- Area^{1}: 26.48 km^{2} (10.22 sq mi)
- Elevation: 620 m (2,030 ft)
- Highest elevation: 747 m (2,451 ft)
- Lowest elevation: 335 m (1,099 ft)
- Population (2023): 409
  - Density: 15.4/km^{2} (40.0/sq mi)
- Time zone: UTC+01:00 (CET)
  - Summer (DST): UTC+02:00 (CEST)
- INSEE/Postal code: 69035 /69840
- ^{1} French Land Register data, which excludes lakes, ponds, glaciers > 1 km^{2} (0.386 sq mi or 247 acres) and river estuaries.

Cenves (French pronunciation: [sɑ̃v]) is a commune in the Rhône department in eastern France.

== See also ==
Communes of the Rhône department
