= Vernay, Rhône =

Vernay
- Commune
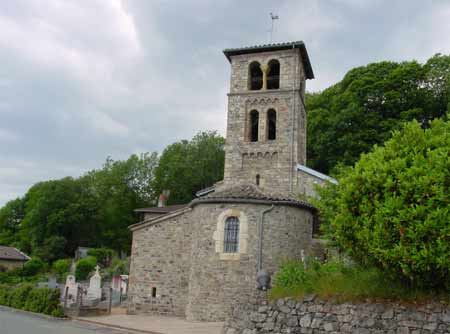
- The church in Vernay

- Coat of arms
- Location of Vernay
- Location within France Location within Auvergne-Rhône-Alpes
- Coordinates: 46°09′29″N 4°31′48″E
- Country: France
- Region: Auvergne-Rhône-Alpes
- Department: Rhône
- Arrondissement: Villefranche-sur-Saône
- Canton: Belleville-en-Beaujolais

Government
  - Mayor (2020–2026): Philippe Perret
- Area^{1}: 5.59 km^{2} (2.16 sq mi)
- Elevation: 650 m (2,130 ft)
- Highest elevation: 940 m (3,080 ft)
- Lowest elevation: 393 m (1,289 ft)
- Population (2023): 124
  - Density: 22.2/km^{2} (57.5/sq mi)
- Time zone: UTC+01:00 (CET)
  - Summer (DST): UTC+02:00 (CEST)
- INSEE/Postal code: 69261 /69430
- ^{1} French Land Register data, which excludes lakes, ponds, glaciers > 1 km^{2} (0.386 sq mi or 247 acres) and river estuaries.

Vernay (French pronunciation: [vɛʁnɛ]) is a commune (municipality) and former bishopric in the Rhône department in eastern France.

== History ==
There is no archaeological or written evidence of Roman or earlier occupation on the site.

Around 400 a Latin Catholic Diocese of Vernay was established. Neither incumbents nor other details are available. It was suppressed, apparently without direct successor.

== See also ==
- Communes of the Rhône department
- List of Catholic dioceses in France

== Sources and external links ==
- GCatholic - former bishopric
