= Marchampt =

- Commune
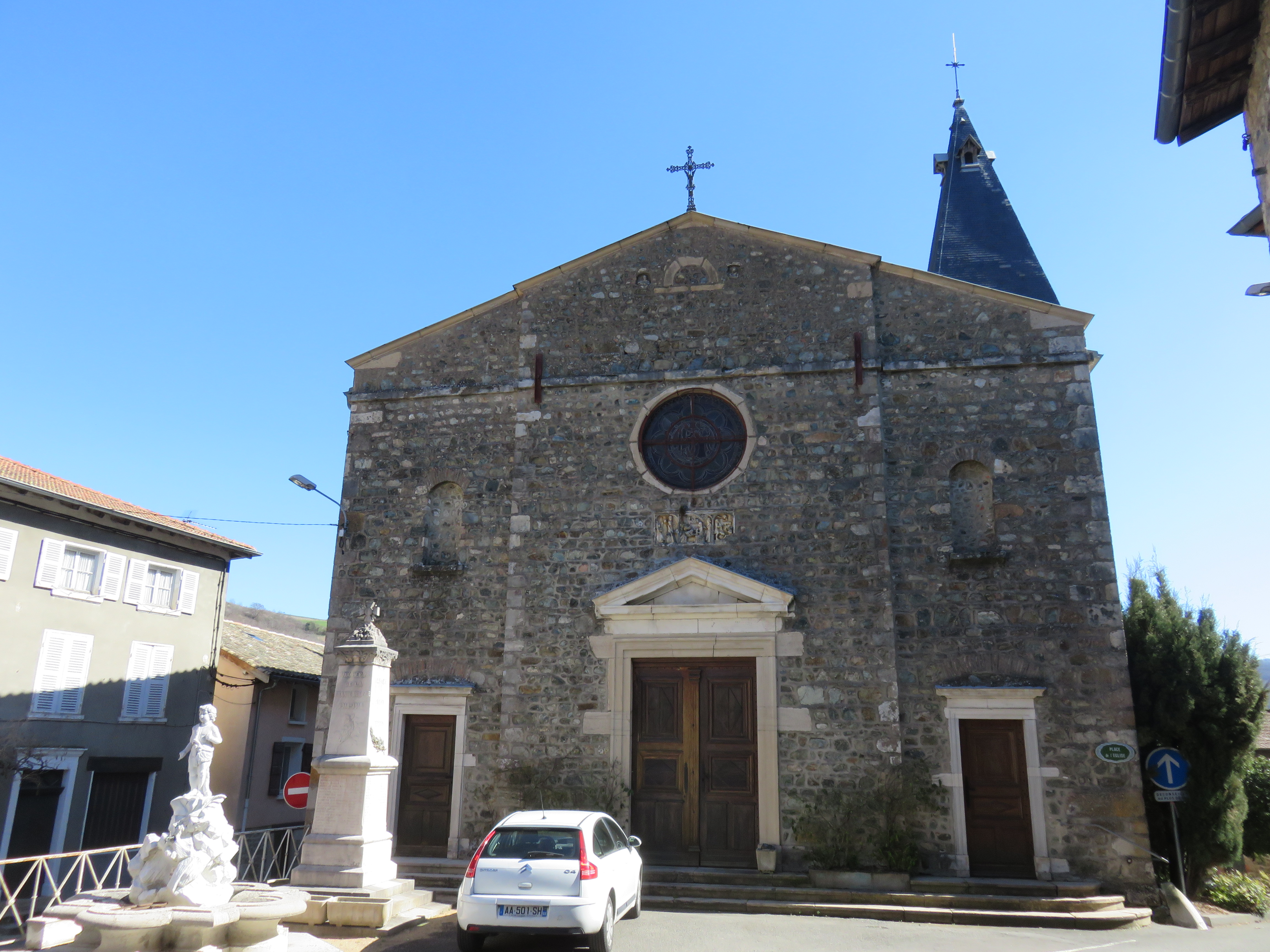
- The church in Marchampt
- Location of Marchampt
- Location within France Location within Auvergne-Rhône-Alpes
- Coordinates: 46°06′48″N 4°34′20″E
- Country: France
- Region: Auvergne-Rhône-Alpes
- Department: Rhône
- Arrondissement: Villefranche-sur-Saône
- Canton: Belleville-en-Beaujolais
- Intercommunality: Saône Beaujolais

Government
  - Mayor (2022–2026): Philippe Georges
- Area^{1}: 17.74 km^{2} (6.85 sq mi)
- Elevation: 440 m (1,440 ft)
- Highest elevation: 883 m (2,897 ft)
- Lowest elevation: 318 m (1,043 ft)
- Population (2023): 450
  - Density: 25/km^{2} (66/sq mi)
- Time zone: UTC+01:00 (CET)
  - Summer (DST): UTC+02:00 (CEST)
- INSEE/Postal code: 69124 /69430
- ^{1} French Land Register data, which excludes lakes, ponds, glaciers > 1 km^{2} (0.386 sq mi or 247 acres) and river estuaries.

Marchampt (French pronunciation: [maʁʃɑ̃]) is a commune in the Rhône department in eastern France.

== See also ==
- Communes of the Rhône department
