= Juliénas =

- Commune
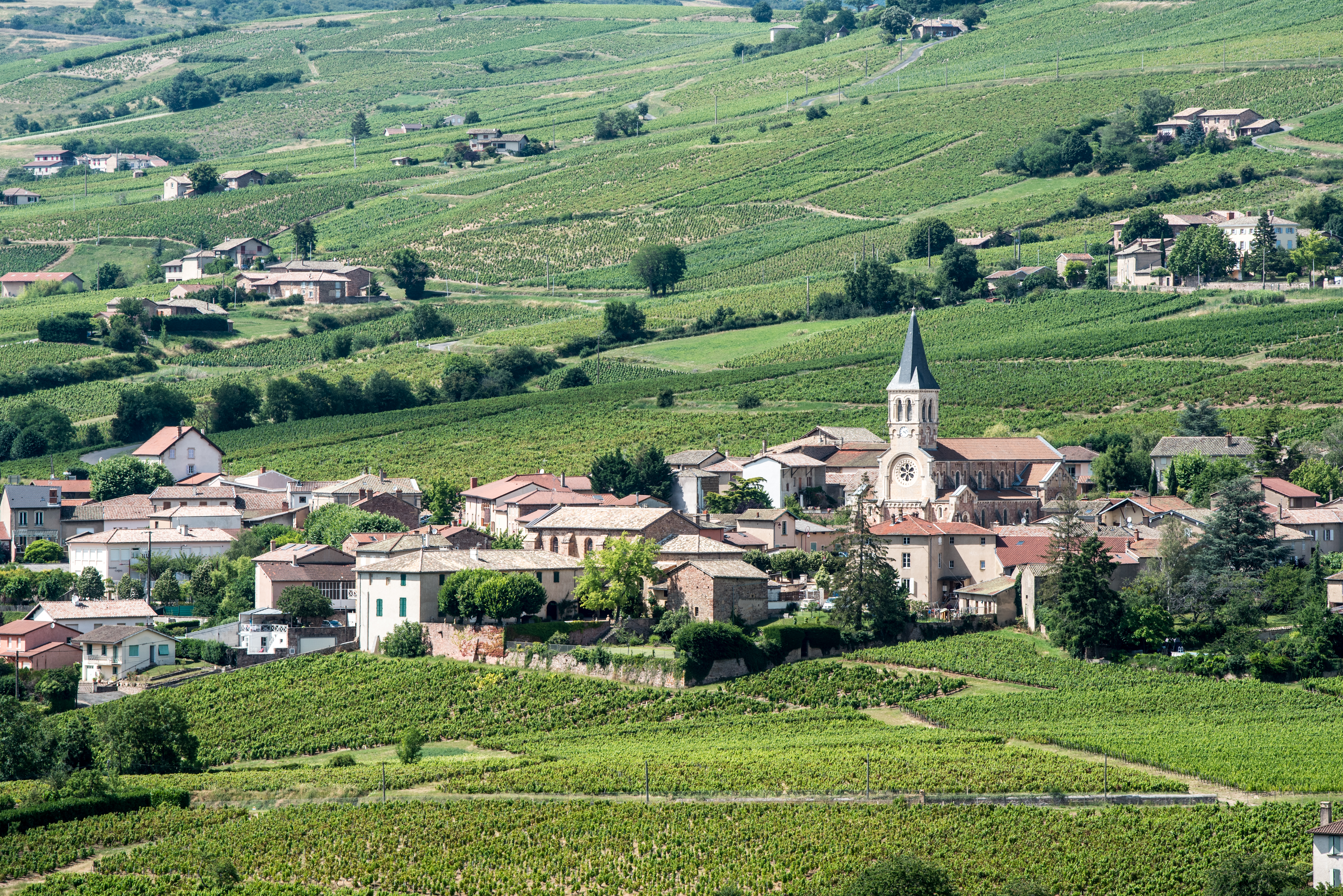
- Location of Juliénas
- Location within France Location within Auvergne-Rhône-Alpes
- Coordinates: 46°14′09″N 4°42′43″E
- Country: France
- Region: Auvergne-Rhône-Alpes
- Department: Rhône
- Arrondissement: Villefranche-sur-Saône
- Canton: Belleville-en-Beaujolais

Government
  - Mayor (2020–2026): Elisabeth Roux
- Area^{1}: 7.56 km^{2} (2.92 sq mi)
- Elevation: 200 m (660 ft)
- Highest elevation: 655 m (2,149 ft)
- Lowest elevation: 217 m (712 ft)
- Population (2023): 880
  - Density: 120/km^{2} (300/sq mi)
- Time zone: UTC+01:00 (CET)
  - Summer (DST): UTC+02:00 (CEST)
- INSEE/Postal code: 69103 /69840
- ^{1} French Land Register data, which excludes lakes, ponds, glaciers > 1 km^{2} (0.386 sq mi or 247 acres) and river estuaries.

Juliénas is a commune in the department of Rhône, in east-central France.

== See also ==
- Juliénas AOC (Beaujolais cru), a wine from the Beaujolais region
- Communes of the Rhône department
