= Lancié =

- Commune
- Location of Lancié
- Location within France Location within Auvergne-Rhône-Alpes
- Coordinates: 46°10′18″N 4°42′54″E
- Country: France
- Region: Auvergne-Rhône-Alpes
- Department: Rhône
- Arrondissement: Villefranche-sur-Saône
- Canton: Belleville-en-Beaujolais
- Intercommunality: Saône-Beaujolais

Government
  - Mayor (2020–2026): Jacky Menichon (MRSL)
- Area^{1}: 6.6 km^{2} (2.5 sq mi)
- Elevation: 210 m (690 ft)
- Highest elevation: 258 m (846 ft)
- Lowest elevation: 172 m (564 ft)
- Population (2023): 1,101
  - Density: 170/km^{2} (430/sq mi)
- Time zone: UTC+01:00 (CET)
  - Summer (DST): UTC+02:00 (CEST)
- INSEE/Postal code: 69108 /69220
- ^{1} French Land Register data, which excludes lakes, ponds, glaciers > 1 km^{2} (0.386 sq mi or 247 acres) and river estuaries.

Lancié (French pronunciation: [lɑ̃sje]) is a commune in the Rhône department in eastern France.

== See also ==
- Communes of the Rhône department
