= Saint-Lager =

- Commune
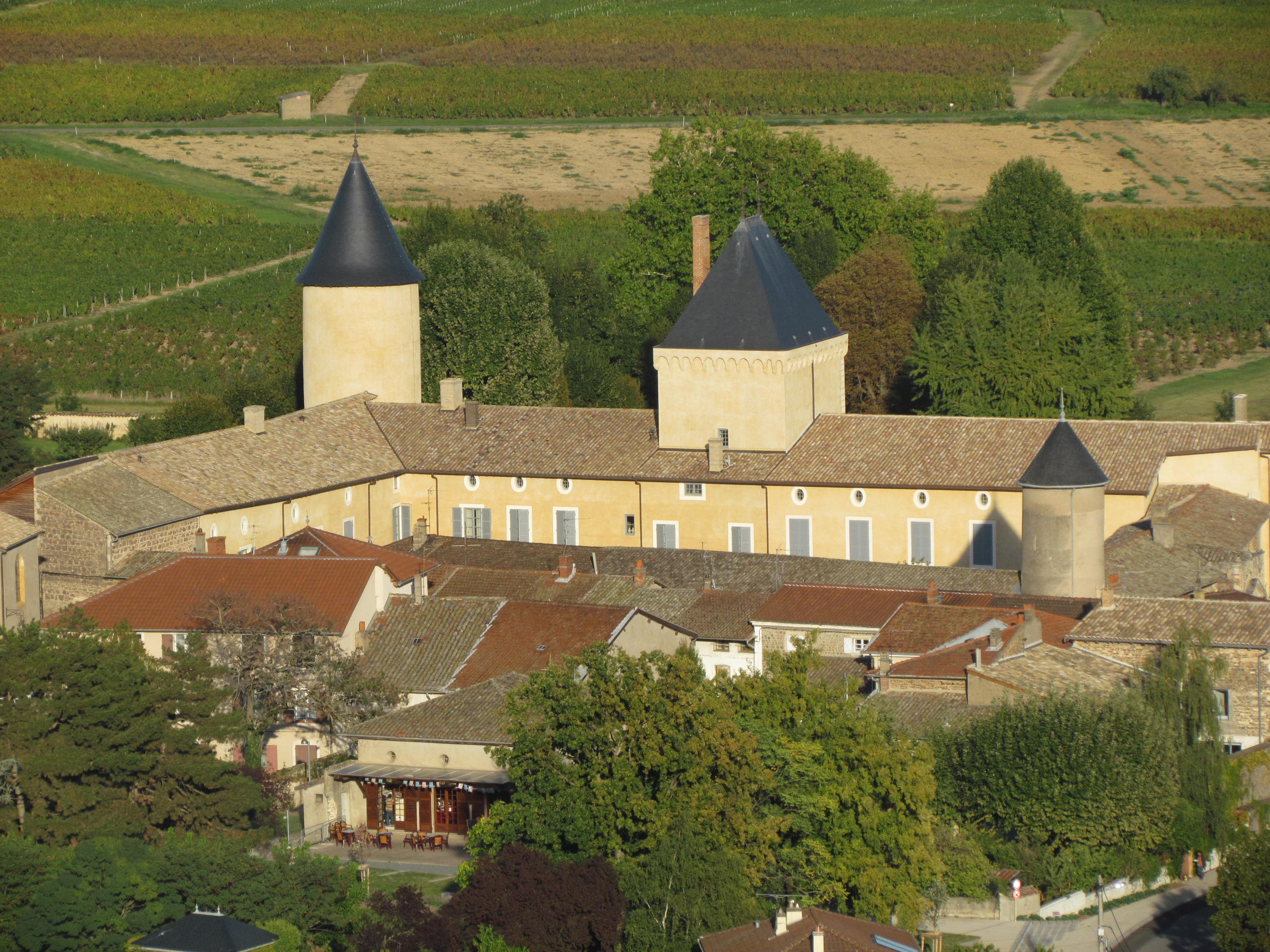
- The Château of Saint-Lager
- Location of Saint-Lager
- Location within France Location within Auvergne-Rhône-Alpes
- Coordinates: 46°06′45″N 4°40′25″E
- Country: France
- Region: Auvergne-Rhône-Alpes
- Department: Rhône
- Arrondissement: Villefranche-sur-Saône
- Canton: Belleville-en-Beaujolais
- Intercommunality: Saône-Beaujolais

Government
  - Mayor (2020–2026): Jean-Paul Varichon
- Area^{1}: 7.74 km^{2} (2.99 sq mi)
- Elevation: 225 m (738 ft)
- Highest elevation: 481 m (1,578 ft)
- Lowest elevation: 189 m (620 ft)
- Population (2023): 1,056
  - Density: 136/km^{2} (353/sq mi)
- Time zone: UTC+01:00 (CET)
  - Summer (DST): UTC+02:00 (CEST)
- INSEE/Postal code: 69218 /69220
- ^{1} French Land Register data, which excludes lakes, ponds, glaciers > 1 km^{2} (0.386 sq mi or 247 acres) and river estuaries.

Saint-Lager (French pronunciation: [sɛ̃ laʒe]) is a commune in the Rhône department in eastern France.

== See also ==
- Communes of the Rhône department
