= Jullié =

- Commune
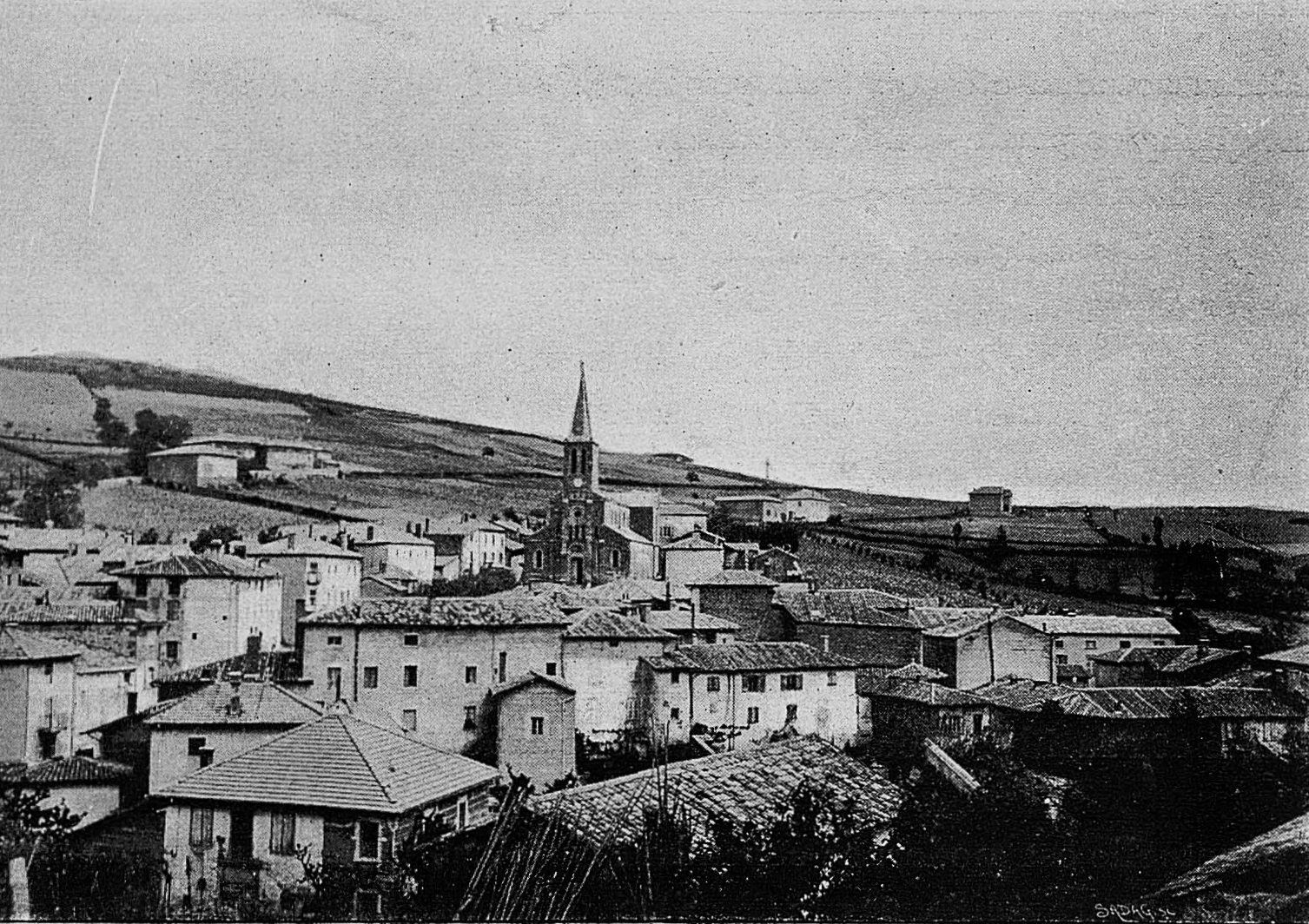
- A general view of Jullié, at the beginning of the 20th century
- Location of Jullié
- Location within France Location within Auvergne-Rhône-Alpes
- Coordinates: 46°14′35″N 4°40′43″E
- Country: France
- Region: Auvergne-Rhône-Alpes
- Department: Rhône
- Arrondissement: Villefranche-sur-Saône
- Canton: Belleville-en-Beaujolais

Government
  - Mayor (2020–2026): Jérémy Thien
- Area^{1}: 9.88 km^{2} (3.81 sq mi)
- Elevation: 370 m (1,210 ft)
- Highest elevation: 704 m (2,310 ft)
- Lowest elevation: 255 m (837 ft)
- Population (2023): 492
  - Density: 49.8/km^{2} (129/sq mi)
- Time zone: UTC+01:00 (CET)
  - Summer (DST): UTC+02:00 (CEST)
- INSEE/Postal code: 69104 /69840
- ^{1} French Land Register data, which excludes lakes, ponds, glaciers > 1 km^{2} (0.386 sq mi or 247 acres) and river estuaries.

Jullié (French pronunciation: [ʒylje]) is a commune in the Rhône department in eastern France.

== See also ==
- Communes of the Rhône department
