= Taponas =

- Commune
- Location of Taponas
- Location within France Location within Auvergne-Rhône-Alpes
- Coordinates: 46°07′21″N 4°46′03″E
- Country: France
- Region: Auvergne-Rhône-Alpes
- Department: Rhône
- Arrondissement: Villefranche-sur-Saône
- Canton: Belleville-en-Beaujolais
- Intercommunality: Saône Beaujolais

Government
  - Mayor (2020–2026): Daniel Fayard
- Area^{1}: 7.64 km^{2} (2.95 sq mi)
- Elevation: 175 m (574 ft)
- Highest elevation: 189 m (620 ft)
- Lowest elevation: 168 m (551 ft)
- Population (2023): 914
  - Density: 120/km^{2} (310/sq mi)
- Time zone: UTC+01:00 (CET)
  - Summer (DST): UTC+02:00 (CEST)
- INSEE/Postal code: 69242 /69220
- ^{1} French Land Register data, which excludes lakes, ponds, glaciers > 1 km^{2} (0.386 sq mi or 247 acres) and river estuaries.

Taponas (French pronunciation: [tapɔna]) is a commune in the Rhône department in eastern France.

== See also ==
- Communes of the Rhône department
