= Les Ardillats =

- Commune
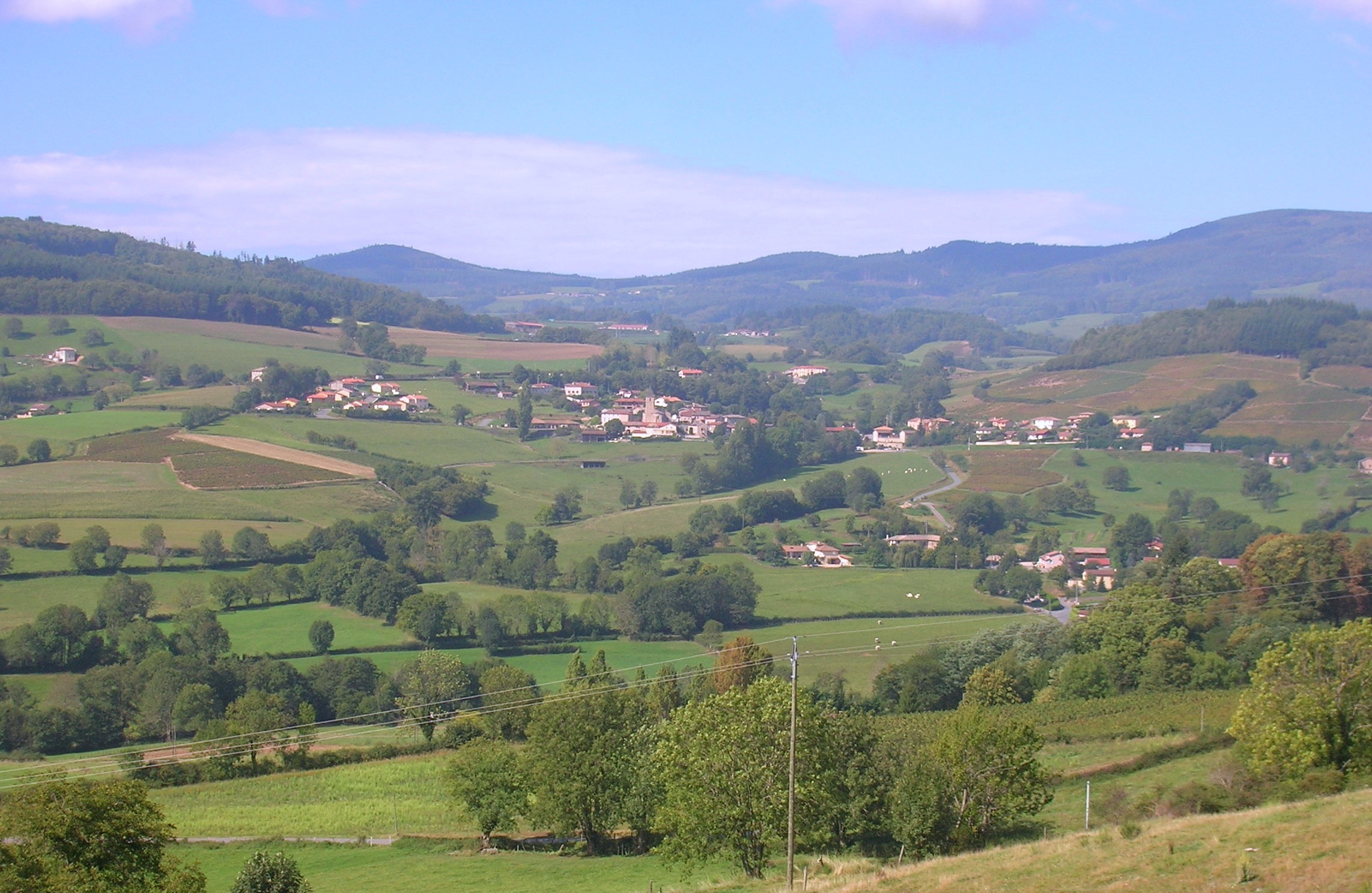
- A general view of Les Ardillats
- Location of Les Ardillats
- Location within France Location within Auvergne-Rhône-Alpes
- Coordinates: 46°10′49″N 4°32′29″E
- Country: France
- Region: Auvergne-Rhône-Alpes
- Department: Rhône
- Arrondissement: Villefranche-sur-Saône
- Canton: Belleville-en-Beaujolais

Government
  - Mayor (2020–2026): Jean-Michel Morey
- Area^{1}: 23.1 km^{2} (8.9 sq mi)
- Elevation: 450 m (1,480 ft)
- Highest elevation: 1,004 m (3,294 ft)
- Lowest elevation: 334 m (1,096 ft)
- Population (2023): 628
  - Density: 27.2/km^{2} (70.4/sq mi)
- Time zone: UTC+01:00 (CET)
  - Summer (DST): UTC+02:00 (CEST)
- INSEE/Postal code: 69012 /69430
- ^{1} French Land Register data, which excludes lakes, ponds, glaciers > 1 km^{2} (0.386 sq mi or 247 acres) and river estuaries.

Les Ardillats (French pronunciation: [le.z‿aʁdija]) is a commune of the Rhône department in eastern France.

== See also ==
- Communes of the Rhône department
