= Quincié-en-Beaujolais =

- Commune
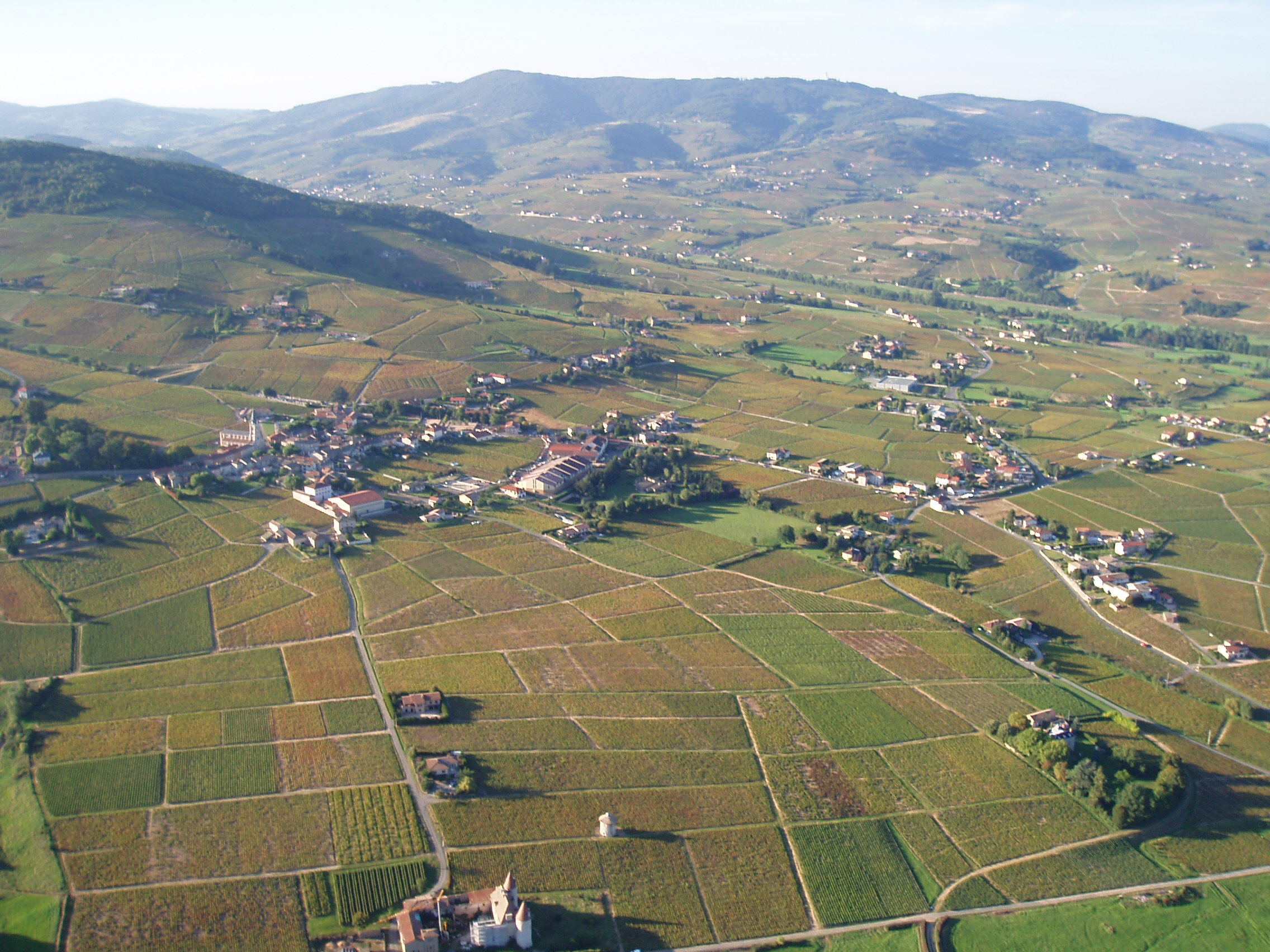
- An aerial view of Quincié
- Location of Quincié-en-Beaujolais
- Location within France Location within Auvergne-Rhône-Alpes
- Coordinates: 46°07′11″N 4°37′02″E
- Country: France
- Region: Auvergne-Rhône-Alpes
- Department: Rhône
- Arrondissement: Villefranche-sur-Saône
- Canton: Belleville-en-Beaujolais

Government
  - Mayor (2020–2026): Daniel Michaud
- Area^{1}: 22.05 km^{2} (8.51 sq mi)
- Elevation: 234 m (768 ft)
- Highest elevation: 729 m (2,392 ft)
- Lowest elevation: 236 m (774 ft)
- Population (2023): 1,408
  - Density: 63.85/km^{2} (165.4/sq mi)
- Time zone: UTC+01:00 (CET)
  - Summer (DST): UTC+02:00 (CEST)
- INSEE/Postal code: 69162 /69430
- ^{1} French Land Register data, which excludes lakes, ponds, glaciers > 1 km^{2} (0.386 sq mi or 247 acres) and river estuaries.

Quincié-en-Beaujolais is a commune in the Rhône department in eastern France. The main activity of the commune is viticulture with four AOCs: Beaujolais, Beaujolais-Villages, Brouilly and Côte-de-Brouilly.

== See also ==
- Communes of the Rhône department
