= Saint-Didier-sur-Beaujeu =

- Commune
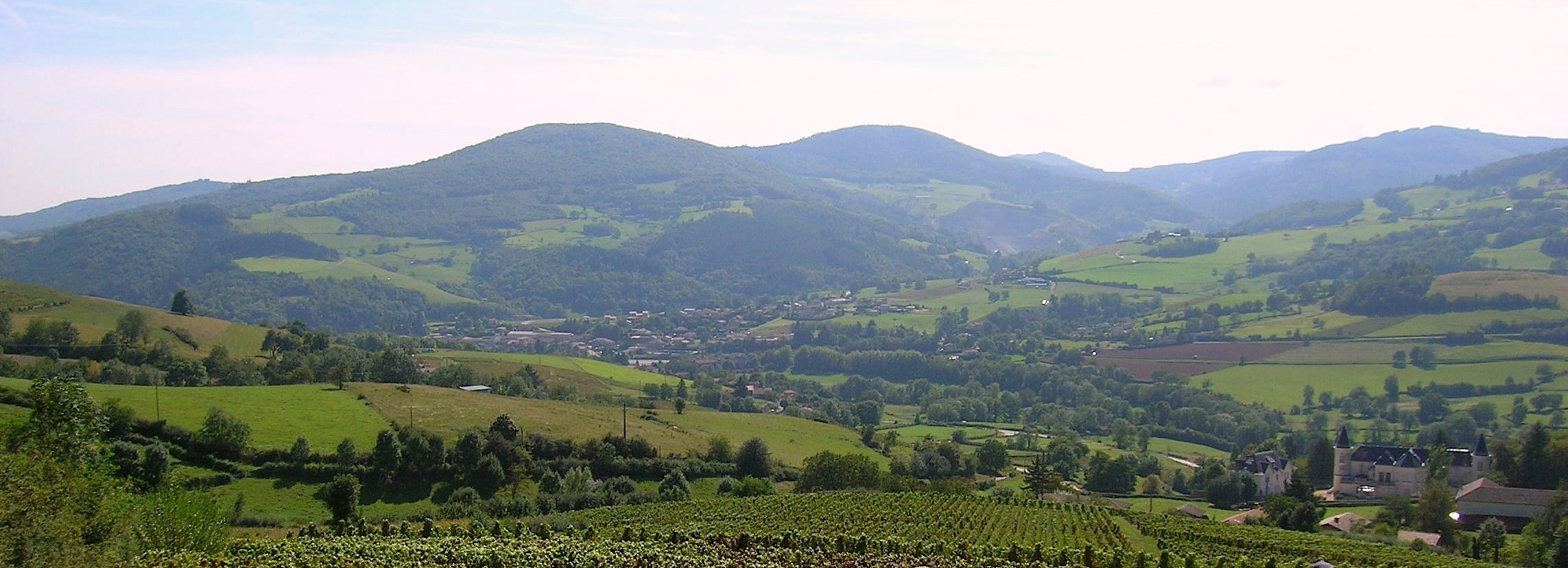
- A general view of Saint-Didier-sur-Beaujeu
- Location of Saint-Didier-sur-Beaujeu
- Location within France Location within Auvergne-Rhône-Alpes
- Coordinates: 46°09′27″N 4°32′50″E
- Country: France
- Region: Auvergne-Rhône-Alpes
- Department: Rhône
- Arrondissement: Villefranche-sur-Saône
- Canton: Belleville-en-Beaujolais
- Intercommunality: Saône-Beaujolais

Government
  - Mayor (2020–2026): Yves Devillaine
- Area^{1}: 14.62 km^{2} (5.64 sq mi)
- Elevation: 430 m (1,410 ft)
- Highest elevation: 940 m (3,080 ft)
- Lowest elevation: 331 m (1,086 ft)
- Population (2023): 603
  - Density: 41.2/km^{2} (107/sq mi)
- Time zone: UTC+01:00 (CET)
  - Summer (DST): UTC+02:00 (CEST)
- INSEE/Postal code: 69196 /69430
- ^{1} French Land Register data, which excludes lakes, ponds, glaciers > 1 km^{2} (0.386 sq mi or 247 acres) and river estuaries.

Saint-Didier-sur-Beaujeu (French pronunciation: [sɛ̃ didje syʁ boʒø], literally Saint-Didier on Beaujeu) is a commune in the Rhône department in eastern France.

== See also ==
- Communes of the Rhône department
