= Régnié-Durette =

- Commune
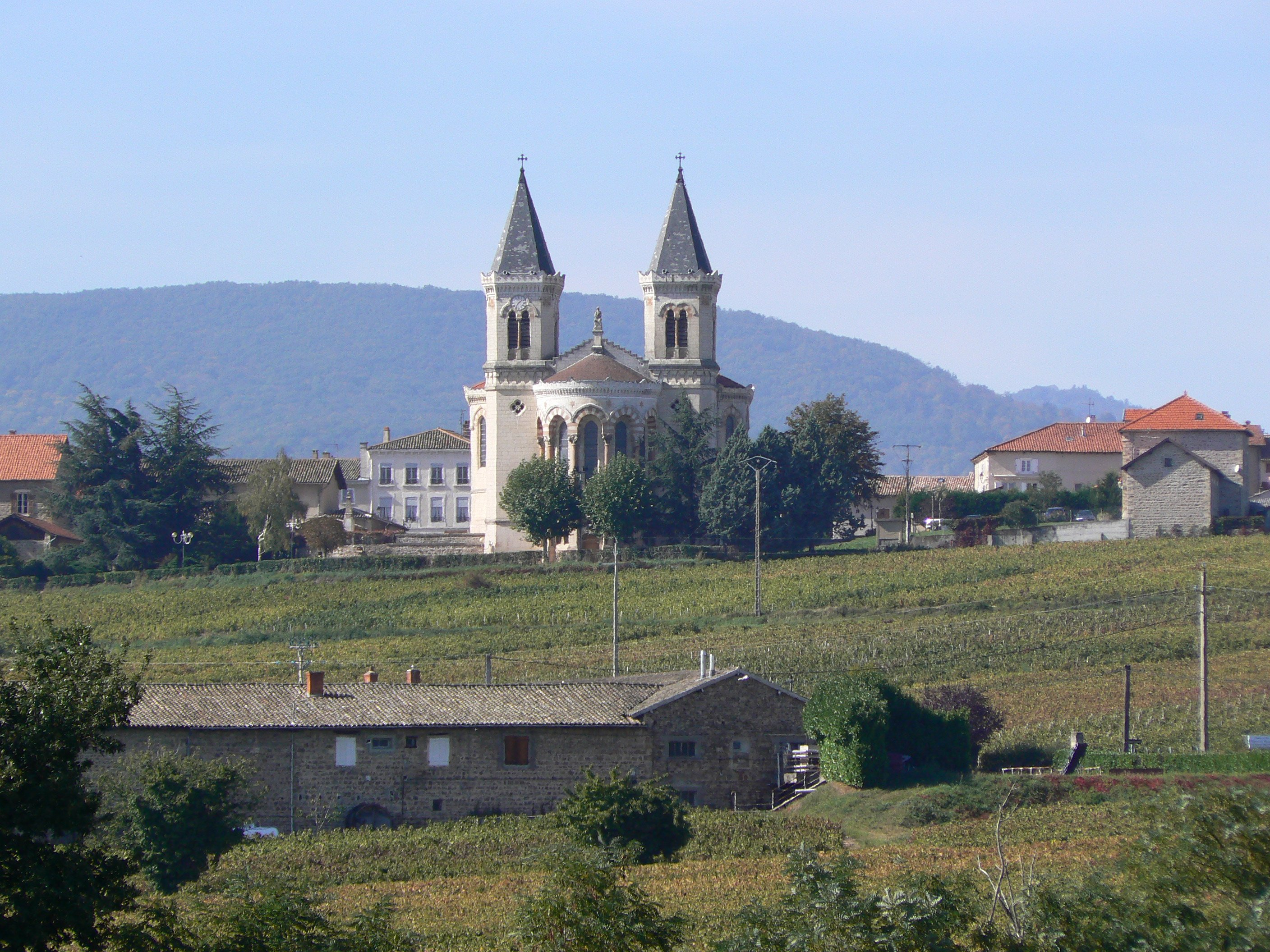
- The church
- Location of Régnié-Durette
- Location within France Location within Auvergne-Rhône-Alpes
- Coordinates: 46°08′19″N 4°38′31″E
- Country: France
- Region: Auvergne-Rhône-Alpes
- Department: Rhône
- Arrondissement: Villefranche-sur-Saône
- Canton: Belleville-en-Beaujolais

Government
  - Mayor (2020–2026): Jean-Paul Robin
- Area^{1}: 11.72 km^{2} (4.53 sq mi)
- Elevation: 316 m (1,037 ft)
- Highest elevation: 820 m (2,690 ft)
- Lowest elevation: 228 m (748 ft)
- Population (2023): 1,151
  - Density: 98.21/km^{2} (254.4/sq mi)
- Time zone: UTC+01:00 (CET)
  - Summer (DST): UTC+02:00 (CEST)
- INSEE/Postal code: 69165 /69430
- ^{1} French Land Register data, which excludes lakes, ponds, glaciers > 1 km^{2} (0.386 sq mi or 247 acres) and river estuaries.

Régnié-Durette (French pronunciation: [ʁeɲe dyʁɛt]) is a commune in the Rhône department in eastern France. The commune was formed in 1973 by the merger of the former communes Régnié and Durette.

== See also ==
- Communes of the Rhône department
