= Émeringes =

- Commune
- Location of Émeringes
- Location within France Location within Auvergne-Rhône-Alpes
- Coordinates: 46°13′25″N 4°40′27″E
- Country: France
- Region: Auvergne-Rhône-Alpes
- Department: Rhône
- Arrondissement: Villefranche-sur-Saône
- Canton: Belleville-en-Beaujolais

Government
  - Mayor (2020–2026): Patrick du Chaylard
- Area^{1}: 3.01 km^{2} (1.16 sq mi)
- Elevation: 353 m (1,158 ft)
- Highest elevation: 624 m (2,047 ft)
- Lowest elevation: 249 m (817 ft)
- Population (2023): 275
  - Density: 91.4/km^{2} (237/sq mi)
- Time zone: UTC+01:00 (CET)
  - Summer (DST): UTC+02:00 (CEST)
- INSEE/Postal code: 69082 /69840
- ^{1} French Land Register data, which excludes lakes, ponds, glaciers > 1 km^{2} (0.386 sq mi or 247 acres) and river estuaries.

Émeringes is a commune in the Rhône department in eastern France.

== See also ==
- Communes of the Rhône department
