= Corcelles-en-Beaujolais =

- Commune
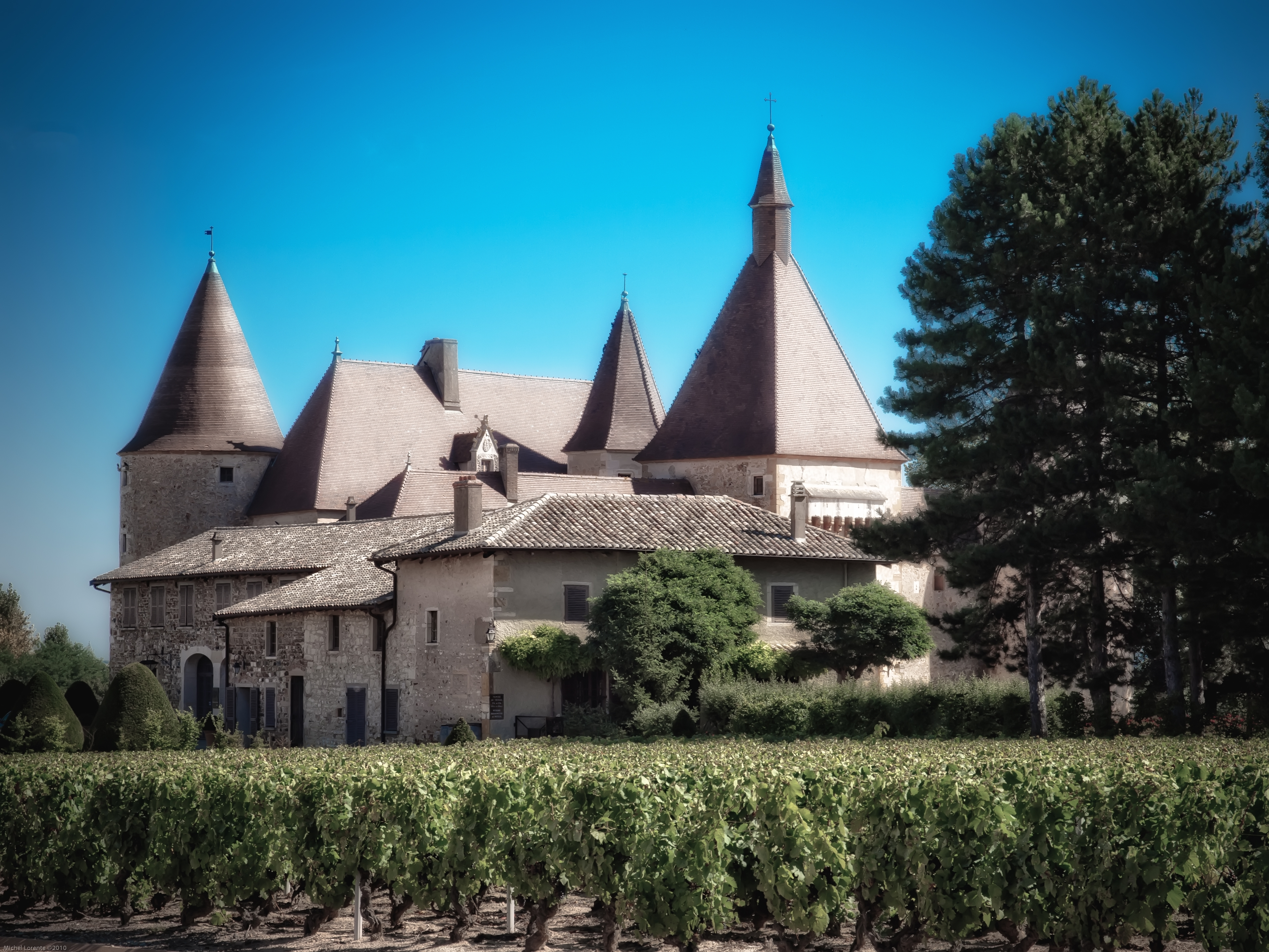
- The chateau in Corcelles

- Coat of arms
- Location of Corcelles-en-Beaujolais
- Location within France Location within Auvergne-Rhône-Alpes
- Coordinates: 46°09′18″N 4°43′28″E
- Country: France
- Region: Auvergne-Rhône-Alpes
- Department: Rhône
- Arrondissement: Villefranche-sur-Saône
- Canton: Belleville-en-Beaujolais
- Intercommunality: Saône-Beaujolais

Government
  - Mayor (2020–2026): Jean-Paul Chemarin
- Area^{1}: 9.3 km^{2} (3.6 sq mi)
- Elevation: 198 m (650 ft)
- Highest elevation: 247 m (810 ft)
- Lowest elevation: 179 m (587 ft)
- Population (2023): 1,001
  - Density: 110/km^{2} (280/sq mi)
- Time zone: UTC+01:00 (CET)
  - Summer (DST): UTC+02:00 (CEST)
- INSEE/Postal code: 69065 /69220
- ^{1} French Land Register data, which excludes lakes, ponds, glaciers > 1 km^{2} (0.386 sq mi or 247 acres) and river estuaries.

Corcelles-en-Beaujolais (French pronunciation: [kɔʁsɛl ɑ̃ boʒɔlɛ], literally Corcelles in Beaujolais) is a commune in the Rhône department in eastern France.

== See also ==
- Communes of the Rhône department
