= Lantignié =

- Commune
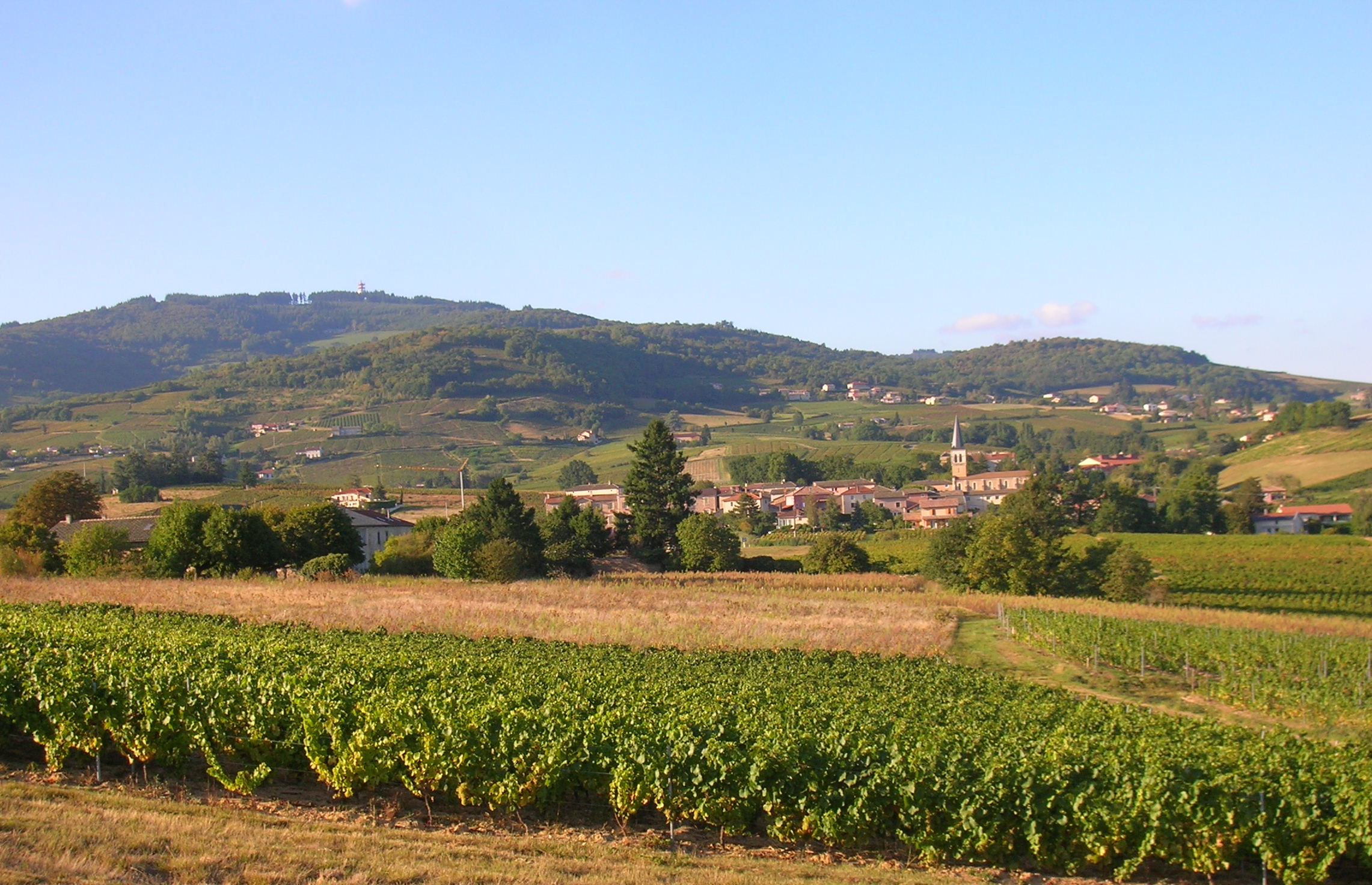
- A general view of Lantignié
- Location of Lantignié
- Location within France Location within Auvergne-Rhône-Alpes
- Coordinates: 46°08′52″N 4°37′27″E
- Country: France
- Region: Auvergne-Rhône-Alpes
- Department: Rhône
- Arrondissement: Villefranche-sur-Saône
- Canton: Belleville-en-Beaujolais
- Intercommunality: Saône-Beaujolais

Government
  - Mayor (2020–2026): Jean-Michel Tournissoux
- Area^{1}: 7.4 km^{2} (2.9 sq mi)
- Elevation: 295 m (968 ft)
- Highest elevation: 841 m (2,759 ft)
- Lowest elevation: 256 m (840 ft)
- Population (2023): 849
  - Density: 110/km^{2} (300/sq mi)
- Time zone: UTC+01:00 (CET)
  - Summer (DST): UTC+02:00 (CEST)
- INSEE/Postal code: 69109 /69430
- ^{1} French Land Register data, which excludes lakes, ponds, glaciers > 1 km^{2} (0.386 sq mi or 247 acres) and river estuaries.

Lantignié (French pronunciation: [lɑ̃tiɲe]) is a commune in the Rhône department in eastern France.

== See also ==
- Communes of the Rhône department
