= Cercié =

- Commune
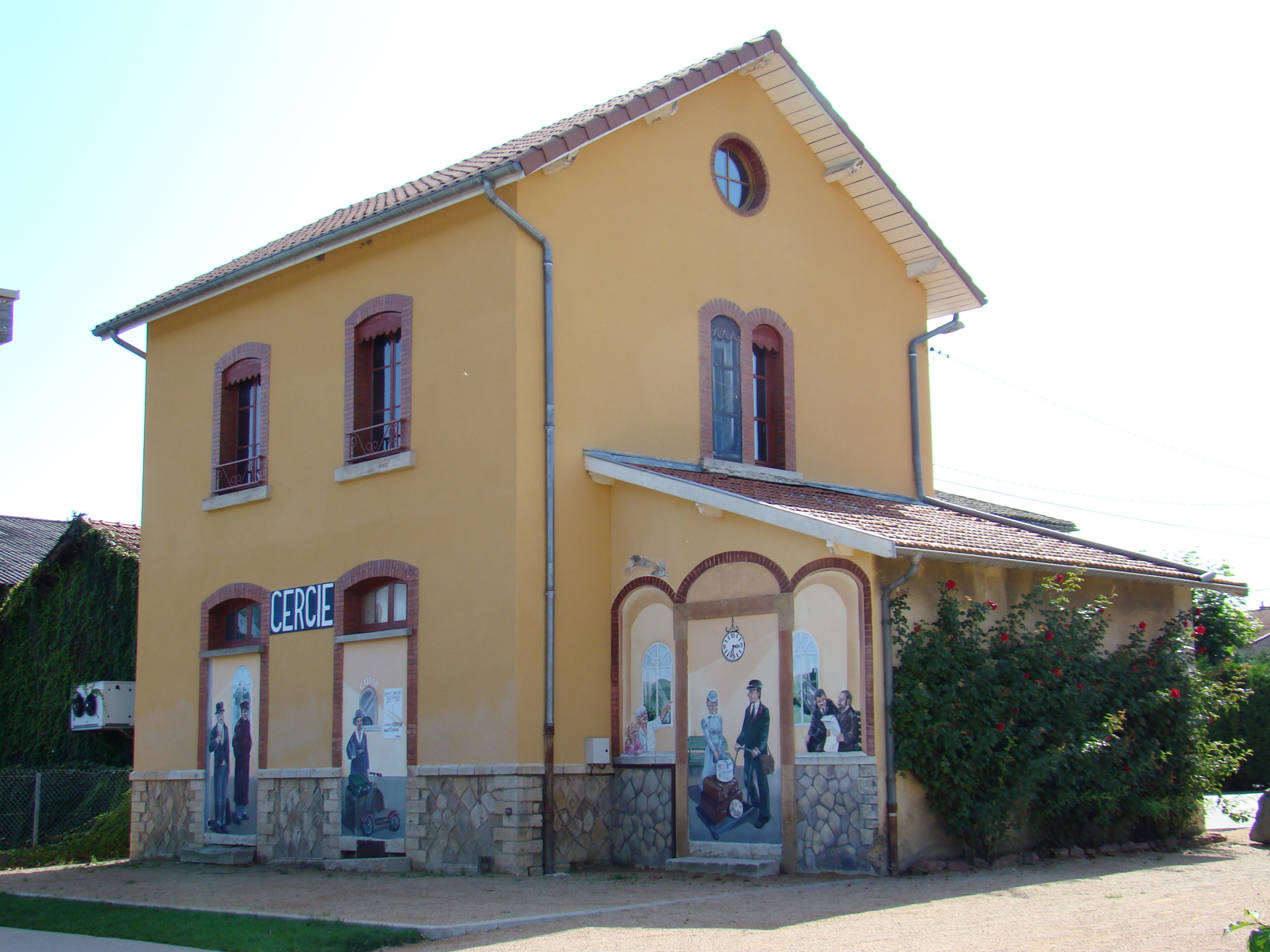
- The former railway station in Cercié
- Location of Cercié
- Location within France Location within Auvergne-Rhône-Alpes
- Coordinates: 46°07′13″N 4°40′17″E
- Country: France
- Region: Auvergne-Rhône-Alpes
- Department: Rhône
- Arrondissement: Villefranche-sur-Saône
- Canton: Belleville-en-Beaujolais
- Intercommunality: Saône-Beaujolais

Government
  - Mayor (2020–2026): Christophe Clauzel
- Area^{1}: 4.94 km^{2} (1.91 sq mi)
- Elevation: 222 m (728 ft)
- Highest elevation: 293 m (961 ft)
- Lowest elevation: 199 m (653 ft)
- Population (2023): 1,131
  - Density: 229/km^{2} (593/sq mi)
- Time zone: UTC+01:00 (CET)
  - Summer (DST): UTC+02:00 (CEST)
- INSEE/Postal code: 69036 /69220
- ^{1} French Land Register data, which excludes lakes, ponds, glaciers > 1 km^{2} (0.386 sq mi or 247 acres) and river estuaries.

Cercié (French pronunciation: [sɛʁsje]) is a rural commune in the Rhône department in eastern France.

== See also ==
Communes of the Rhône department
