= Beaujeu, Rhône =

Beaujeu
- Commune
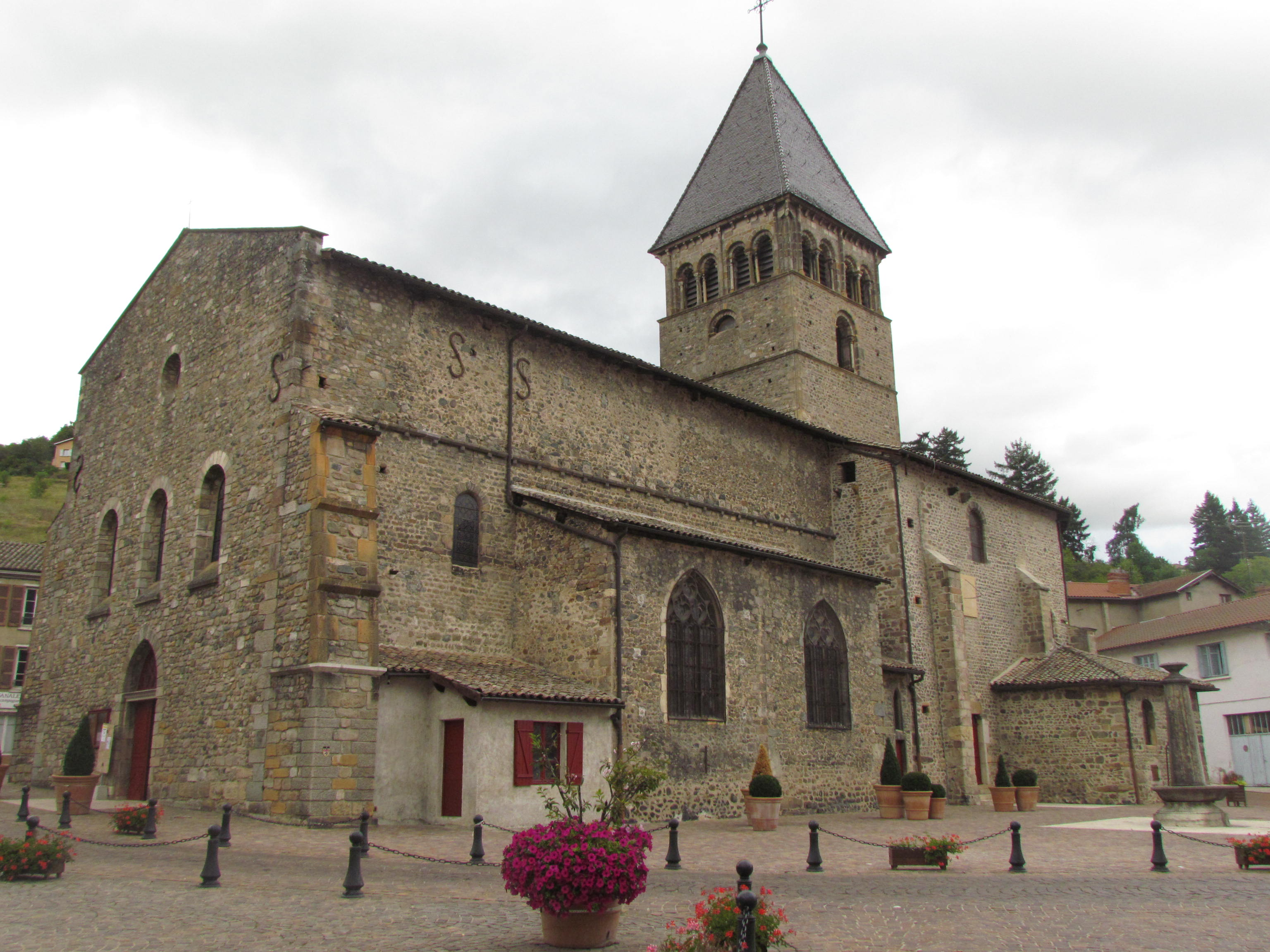
- The Church of Saint-Nicolas, in Beaujeu

- Coat of arms
- Location of Beaujeu
- Location within France Location within Auvergne-Rhône-Alpes
- Coordinates: 46°09′18″N 4°35′20″E
- Country: France
- Region: Auvergne-Rhône-Alpes
- Department: Rhône
- Arrondissement: Villefranche-sur-Saône
- Canton: Belleville-en-Beaujolais

Government
  - Mayor (2020–2026): Sylvain Sotton
- Area^{1}: 17.85 km^{2} (6.89 sq mi)
- Elevation: 293 m (961 ft)
- Highest elevation: 880 m (2,890 ft)
- Lowest elevation: 277 m (909 ft)
- Population (2023): 2,082
  - Density: 116.6/km^{2} (302.1/sq mi)
- Time zone: UTC+01:00 (CET)
  - Summer (DST): UTC+02:00 (CEST)
- INSEE/Postal code: 69018 /69430
- ^{1} French Land Register data, which excludes lakes, ponds, glaciers > 1 km^{2} (0.386 sq mi or 247 acres) and river estuaries.

Beaujeu (Arpitan: Biôjor) is a commune of the Rhône department in eastern France. It lies southwest of Mâcon and northwest of Lyon, on the river Ardière.

Beaujeu gives its name to the famous wine region Beaujolais and the former province Beaujolais (Biôjolês), of which it is the historical capital. However it was overtaken in the 14th century by Villefranche-sur-Saône, which remains the main commercial centre of the region.

== History ==
Beaujolais was a semi-autonomous fiefdom of the Lords of Beaujeu. The barony was acquired in the 9th century by Guillaume, Comte du Lyonnais and Count of Forez; on his death, his son Bérard became the first Lord of Beaujeu.

=== List of rulers ===
Lords:

- Berard of Beaujeu + c. 966
- Guichard I of Beaujeu c. 966-977
- Humbert I of Beaujeu + c. 977-1016
- Guichard II of Beaujeu c. 1016-1050
- Guichard III of Beaujeu c. 1050-1070
- Humbert II of Beaujeu c. 1070-1102
- Guichard IV of Beaujeu 1102-1137
- Humbert III of Beaujeu 1137-1174
- Humbert IV of Beaujeu 1174-1202
- Guichard V le Grand of Beaujeu 1202-1216
- Humbert V of Beaujeu 1216-1250
- Isabelle de Beaujeu 1250-1297 (married Renaud)
- Renaud I of Forez, count of Forez 1250-1297
- Louis de Beaujeu 1250-1295
- Guichard VI of Beaujeu 1295-1331
- Edouard I of Beaujeu 1331-1351 (Marshal of France)
- Antoine of Beaujeu 1351-1374
- Edouard II of Beaujeu 1374-1400 (+1400 without succession)

After the death of Edouard II, the barony passed to his uncle Louis II, Duke of Bourbon and was used as a title first by members of the Bourbon family and then by the House of Orléans. In 1522, Francis I of France confiscated the title and gave it to his mother Louise of Savoy, but it reverted to the French crown on her death in 1531.

== Population ==
Historical population

Year	Pop.	±% p.a.
1836	3,172	—
1861	3,993	+0.92%
1911	2,890	−0.64%
1962	2,157	−0.57%
1968	2,253	+0.73%
1975	2,179	−0.48%
1982	1,953	−1.55%

Year	Pop.	±% p.a.
1990	1,874	−0.51%
1999	1,905	+0.18%
2007	1,997	+0.59%
2012	2,048	+0.51%
2017	2,157	+1.04%
2023	2,082	−0.59%

Source: EHESS and INSEE

== See also ==
- Communes of the Rhône department
