= Canton of Belleville-en-Beaujolais =

Coordinates: 46.16°N 4.68°E

Belleville-en-Beaujolais
- Canton
- Country: France
- Region: Auvergne-Rhône-Alpes
- Department: Rhône
- No. of communes: {{{nbcomm}}}
- Area: 347.57 km^{2} (134.20 sq mi)
- Population (2023): 37,585
  - Density: 108.14/km^{2} (280.07/sq mi)
- INSEE code: 6903

The Canton of Belleville-en-Beaujolais (before March 2020: canton of Belleville) is a French administrative division, located in the Rhône department.

The canton was modified by decree of 27 February 2014 which came into force in March 2015.

== Composition ==
The canton of Belleville is composed of 27 communes:

| Communes | Population (2012) |
|---|---|
| Beaujeu | 2,048 |
| Belleville-en-Beaujolais | 11,774 |
| Cenves | 403 |
| Cercié | 1,149 |
| Charentay | 1,198 |
| Chénas | 539 |
| Chiroubles | 411 |
| Corcelles-en-Beaujolais | 871 |
| Dracé | 988 |
| Émeringes | 226 |
| Fleurie | 1,259 |
| Juliénas | 861 |
| Jullié | 420 |
| Lancié | 903 |
| Lantignié | 835 |
| Les Ardillats | 607 |
| Marchampt | 444 |
| Odenas | 871 |
| Quincié-en-Beaujolais | 1,246 |
| Régnié-Durette | 1,093 |
| Saint-Didier-sur-Beaujeu | 651 |
| Saint-Étienne-la-Varenne | 719 |
| Saint-Lager | 962 |
| Taponas | 930 |
| Vauxrenard | 315 |
| Vernay | 103 |
| Villié-Morgon | 2,013 |

== See also ==
- Cantons of the Rhône department
- Communes of the Rhône department
