= L'Argentière =

L'Argentière may refer to several communes in France:

- L'Argentière-la-Bessée, in the Hautes-Alpes department
- Saint-Genis-l'Argentière, in the Rhône department
- Sainte-Foy-l'Argentière, in the Rhône department
- Villemagne-l'Argentière, in the Hérault department

== See also ==
- Largentière, a commune in the Ardèche department
