= René de Thorigny =

French lawyer and politician

René François Élisabeth Tiburce de Thorigny
- Born: 19 July 1798; Bessenay, Rhône, France
- Died: 22 January 1869 (aged 70); Montrésor, France
- Occupations: lawyer, politician
- Known for: Minister of Justice

René François Élisabeth Tiburce de Thorigny (19 July 1798 – 22 January 1869) was a French lawyer and politician who was appointed Minister of the Interior in the last cabinet of the French Second Republic.

== Early years ==
René François Élisabeth Tiburce de Thorigny was born at Bessenay, Rhône, France, on 19 July 1798. He qualified as an advocate in Paris in 1824. In 1830 he joined the judiciary as a deputy at the court of Lyon. In 1844 he became a deputy at the royal court of Paris, and was made advocate-general in 1845. He was ruined by the February Revolution of 1848.

== Political career ==
Thorigny joined the bar and also wrote for several conservative journals, particularly the Gazette de France. He joined the Bonapartists and on 26 October 1851 was named Minister of the Interior. He pretended to be unaware of the planned coup, and on the night of the coup of 2 December 1851 was replaced by Charles de Morny. In 1852 he became a member of the Consultative Commission and of the Council of State. He was ineffective, and on 4 March 1853 was promoted to the Senate, where he voted with the majority. In December 1858 he was named first president of the court of Amiens. He was made a commander of the Legion of Honour on 8 December 1852. He died at Montrésor on 22 January 1869, aged 70.
