= Canton of L'Arbresle =

Coordinates: 45.8207°N 4.6108°E

L'Arbresle
- Canton
- Country: France
- Region: Auvergne-Rhône-Alpes
- Department: Rhône
- No. of communes: {{{nbcomm}}}
- Area: 292.08 km^{2} (112.77 sq mi)
- Population (2023): 38,753
  - Density: 132.68/km^{2} (343.64/sq mi)
- INSEE code: 6902

The Canton of L'Arbresle is a French administrative division, located in the Rhône department.

The canton was established in 1790. Its boundaries are modified by decree of 27 February 2014 which came into force in March 2015.

== Composition ==
The canton of L'Arbresle is composed of 26 communes:

Communes	Population (2012)
Bessenay	2,249
Bibost	541
Brullioles	797
Brussieu	1,232
Chambost-Longessaigne	886
Chevinay	535
Courzieu	1,117
Éveux	1,265
Fleurieux-sur-l'Arbresle	2,336
Haute-Rivoire	1,396
L'Arbresle	6,161
Les Halles	473
Longessaigne	600
Montromant	437
Montrottier	1,318
Sain-Bel	2,271
Saint-Clément-les-Places	616
Sainte-Foy-l'Argentière	1,290
Saint-Genis-l'Argentière	1,045
Saint-Julien-sur-Bibost	556
Saint-Laurent-de-Chamousset	1,922
Saint-Pierre-la-Palud	2,607
Savigny	1,963
Sourcieux-les-Mines	1,963
Souzy	760
Villechenève	884

== See also ==
- Cantons of the Rhône department
- Communes of the Rhône department
