= Canton of Roanne-Nord =

Coordinates: 46.1061°N 4.0673°E

Roanne-Nord
- Former canton
- Interactive map of Roanne-Nord
- Country: France
- Region: Auvergne-Rhône-Alpes
- Department: Loire
- No. of communes: {{{nbcomm}}}
- Disbanded: 2015
- Population (2012): 32,466

The canton of Roanne-Nord is a French former administrative division located in the department of Loire and the Rhone-Alpes region. It was disbanded following the French canton reorganisation which came into effect in March 2015. It had 32,466 inhabitants (2012).

The canton comprised the following communes:

- La Bénisson-Dieu
- Briennon
- Mably
- Roanne (partly)

== See also ==
- Cantons of the Loire department
