= Savigny Abbey, Rhône =

Abbey in Rhône, France

Coordinates: 45.815896°N 4.575515°E

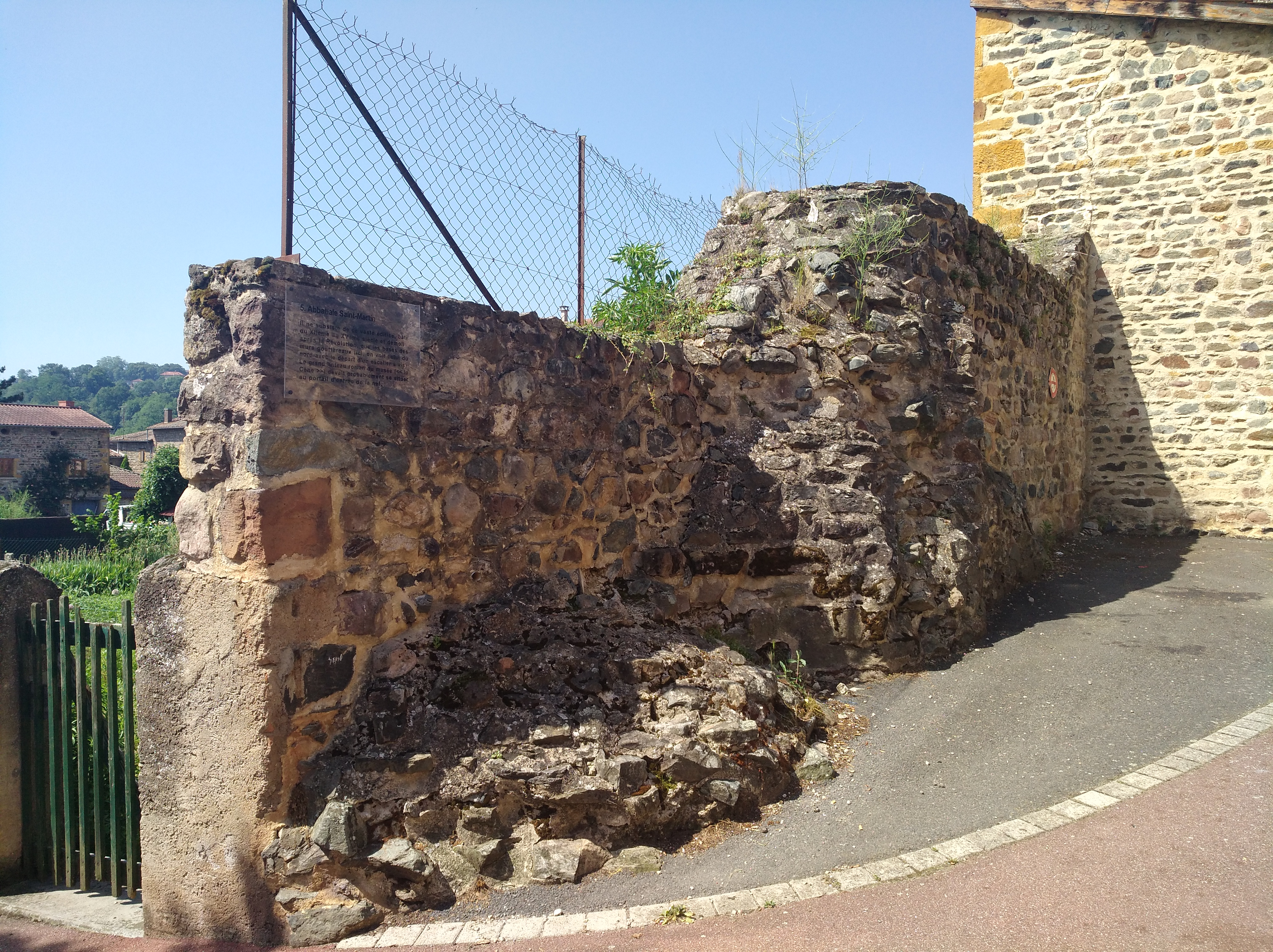
Ruins of the abbey in 2019

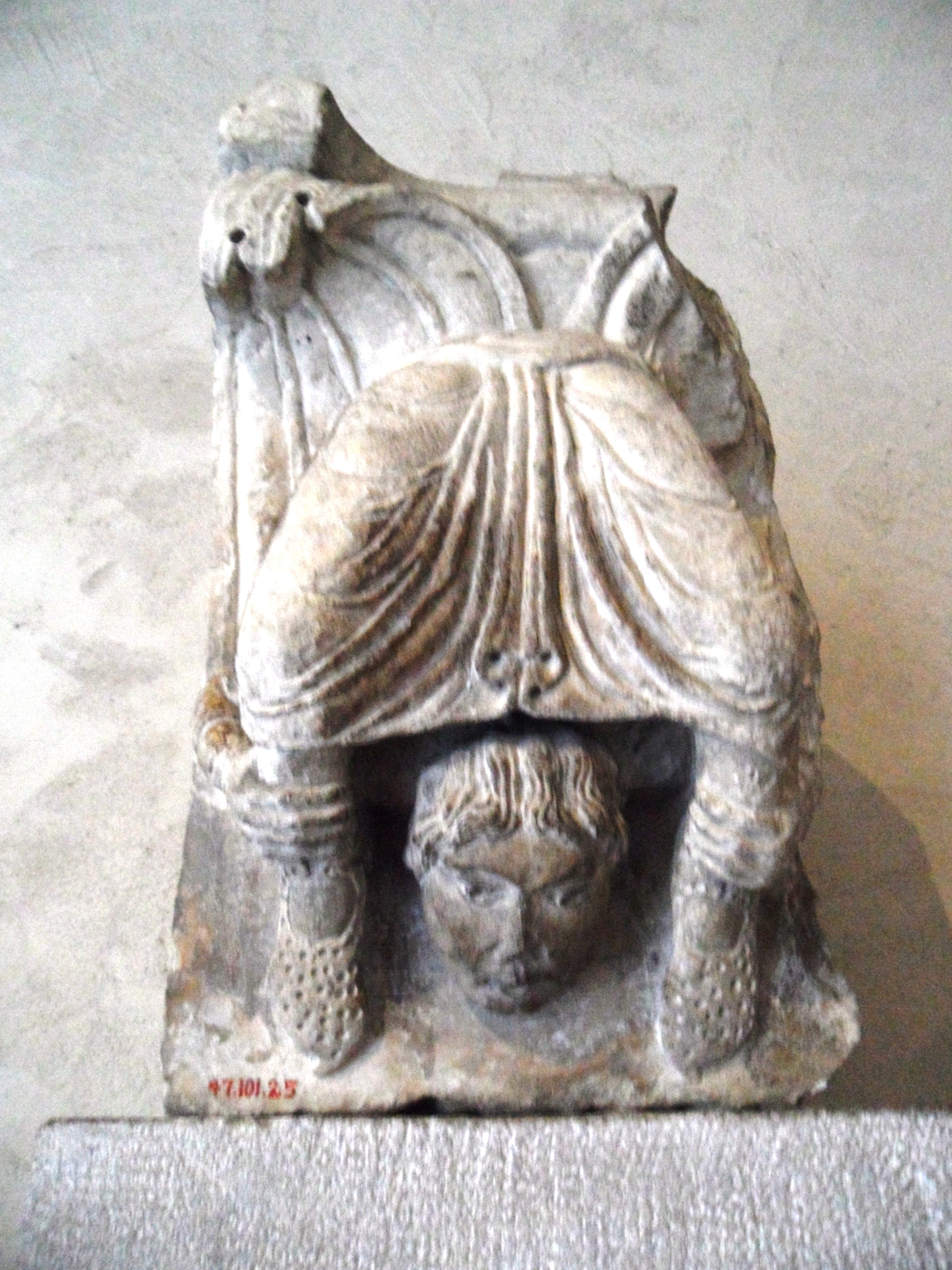
Portion of a Pilaster with an Acrobat Capital from Benedictine Monastery Abbey of Saint-Martin de Savigny at The Metropolitan Museum Cloister Collection

The Abbey of Saint-Martin de Savigny was a Benedictine monastery in the Archdiocese of Lyon. Nothing today survives of its buildings other than some stones in the Musée Lapidaire of Savigny-en-Lyonnais.

It was founded by Leidradus after he resigned as bishop of Lyon in 816. The first mention of the abbey is in a charter of 817. It also appears in the Notitia de servitio monasteriorum of 819, where it is one of the monasteries owing only prayers (orationes) for the emperor and no other service.

In 976, Conrad the Peaceful, King of Burgundy, confirmed the possessions and privileges of the abbey. In 1139, Bernard of Clairvaux wrote to Falco, archbishop of Lyon, indicating that Savigny was in conflict with the abbey of La Bénisson-Dieu over possessions in the Roannais. Bernard was writing in support of La Bénisson-Dieu because its abbot, Alberic, was one of his disciples.

Savigny was eventually placed in commendam and lost its spiritual significance. In 1779, King Louis XVI ordered the closure of the abbey by letters patent. This was confirmed by Pius VI through a Papal bull on 22 June 1780. In 1784, the buildings were sold. The archives of the abbey are now part of the archives of the department of the Rhône.
