= Sainte Marie de La Tourette =

Convent Sainte-Marie de La Tourette
- Interactive map of the Convent Sainte-Marie de La Tourette area

General information
- Type: Convent
- Architectural style: Modernist, International, Brutalist
- Location: Éveux, Rhône-Alpes, France
- Coordinates: 45°49′10″N 4°37′21″E
- Construction started: 1956
- Completed: 1960
- Renovated: 1981

Design and construction
- Architect: Le Corbusier

Website
- www.couventdelatourette.fr

UNESCO World Heritage Site
- Official name: The Architectural Work of Le Corbusier, an Outstanding Contribution to the Modern Movement
- Type: Cultural
- Criteria: i, ii, vi
- Designated: 2016 (40th session)
- Reference no.: 1321-015

Sainte Marie de La Tourette is a Dominican Order priory, located on a hillside near Lyon, France, designed by the architect Le Corbusier, the architect’s final building. The design of the building began in May 1953 and completed in 1960. The committee that decided the creation of the building considered that the primary duty of the monastery should be the spiritual awakening of the people and in particular the inhabitants of nearby areas. As a result, the monastery was constructed in Eveux-sur-Arbresle, which is just 25 km from Lyon and is accessible by train or car.

In July 2016, the building and sixteen other works by Le Corbusier were inscribed as UNESCO World Heritage Sites because of their outstanding testimony to the development of modern architecture.

== Architecture ==
Exterior:

The monastery consists of four perimeter heavy rectangular structures that create a closed interior space. The compact rectangle that rests on the edge of the hill houses the church and the church sacrifice, while the other three wings are raised with pilotis of many different shapes, accommodating living spaces and all the rest functions of the monastery. It has been compared by critics to a parking garage.

Interior:

The monastery was designed to have one hundred bedrooms for apprentices and teachers, study rooms, one workplace and one entertainment room, a dining room, a library and a church. At the lowest level are the dining room and the peristyle of the temple in the form of a cross, that functions as ramp and leads to the church. The study, work, entertainment and library halls are placed on the above level, while the friars' cells are at the highest level. The monastery’s four wings create an enclosed central space.

Patio:

The open space between the four wings isn’t a typical patio. It is divided into four parts by the two vertical corridors joining each other. Forms of different geometry are contained in each of the four parts that are created: a cylinder in the inside is a helix staircase, a prismatic roof, a quadrangular pyramid and a series of polygonal apertures on the roof of a parallelepiped protrusion on church’s wall.

Materials:

The structural form of the building is reinforced concrete, with undulating glass surfaces located on three of the four exterior faces, which were designed by Iannis Xenakis.

The use of the light:

The gradual path from the natural landscape to the interior of the sanctuary, where there is no iconographic representation rather than the view of natural light, is at the same time a continuous removal of the visual phenomena from "out" to "in". The complexity of the landscape is reduced to simple geometric shapes and at the end to the ultimate light.

Light is a way of experiencing the space, as it moves freely within it luring the visitor to do the same. In order to control the amount of light that enters the large public spaces and the long corridors, vertical wavy glass sheets are used.

Now:

Though still functioning for a reduced population of friars, La Tourette has, like Ronchamp, become something of a pilgrimage site for students of architecture. The priory allows overnight stays in the unused cells. Fees for the room go to maintenance of the priory.

== See also ==
- List of Brutalist structures
