= Les Halles, Rhône =

Les Halles
- Commune
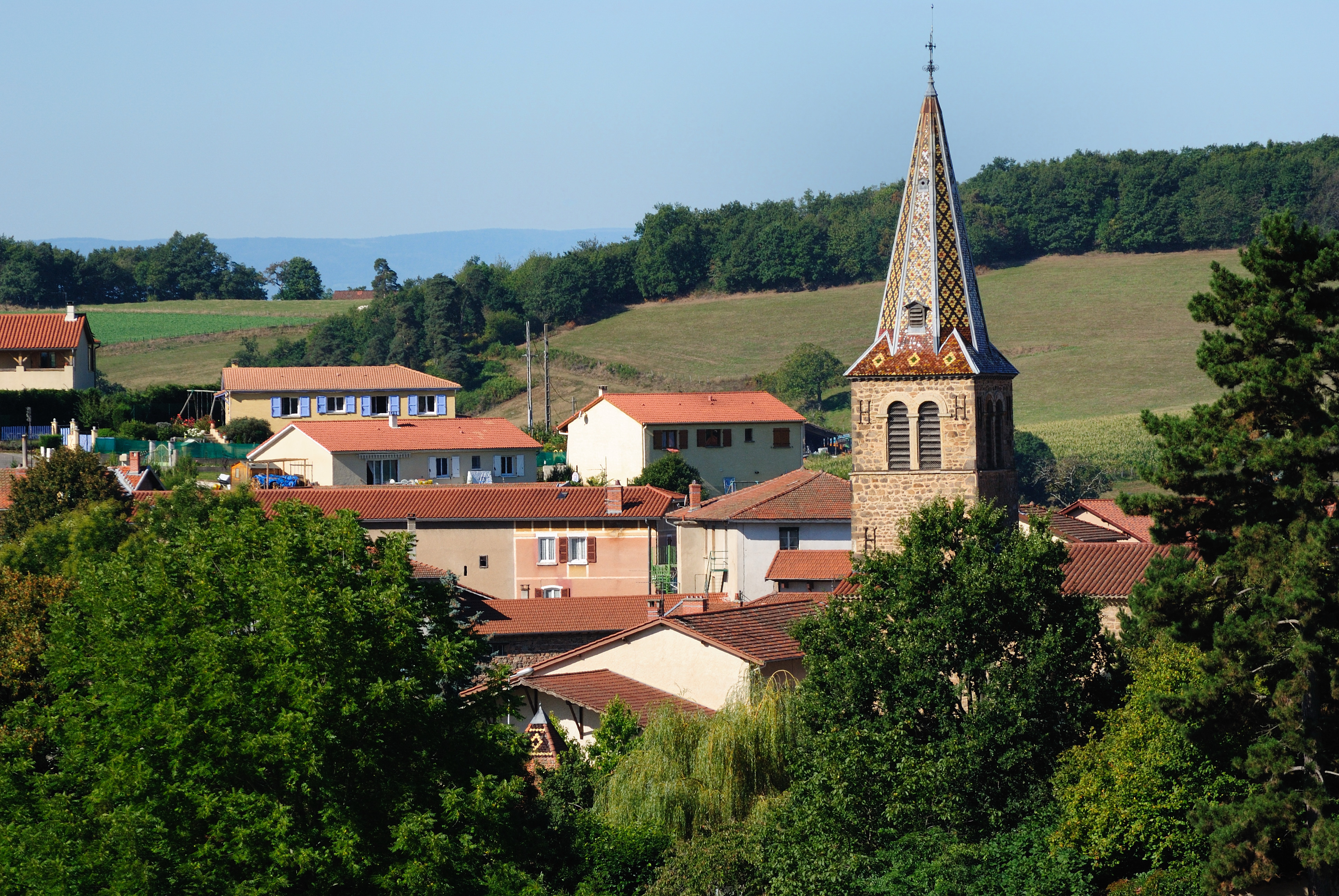
- The church and surrounding buildings in Les Halles

- Coat of arms
- Location of Les Halles
- Location within France Location within Auvergne-Rhône-Alpes
- Coordinates: 45°43′11″N 4°25′58″E
- Country: France
- Region: Auvergne-Rhône-Alpes
- Department: Rhône
- Arrondissement: Lyon
- Canton: L'Arbresle
- Intercommunality: Monts du Lyonnais

Government
  - Mayor (2020–2026): Isabelle Goubier
- Area^{1}: 3.09 km^{2} (1.19 sq mi)
- Elevation: 646 m (2,119 ft)
- Highest elevation: 682 m (2,238 ft)
- Lowest elevation: 468 m (1,535 ft)
- Population (2023): 472
  - Density: 153/km^{2} (396/sq mi)
- Time zone: UTC+01:00 (CET)
  - Summer (DST): UTC+02:00 (CEST)
- INSEE/Postal code: 69098 /69610
- ^{1} French Land Register data, which excludes lakes, ponds, glaciers > 1 km^{2} (0.386 sq mi or 247 acres) and river estuaries.

Les Halles (French pronunciation: [le al]) is a commune in the Rhône department in eastern France.

== See also ==
- Communes of the Rhône department
