= Villechenève =

- Commune
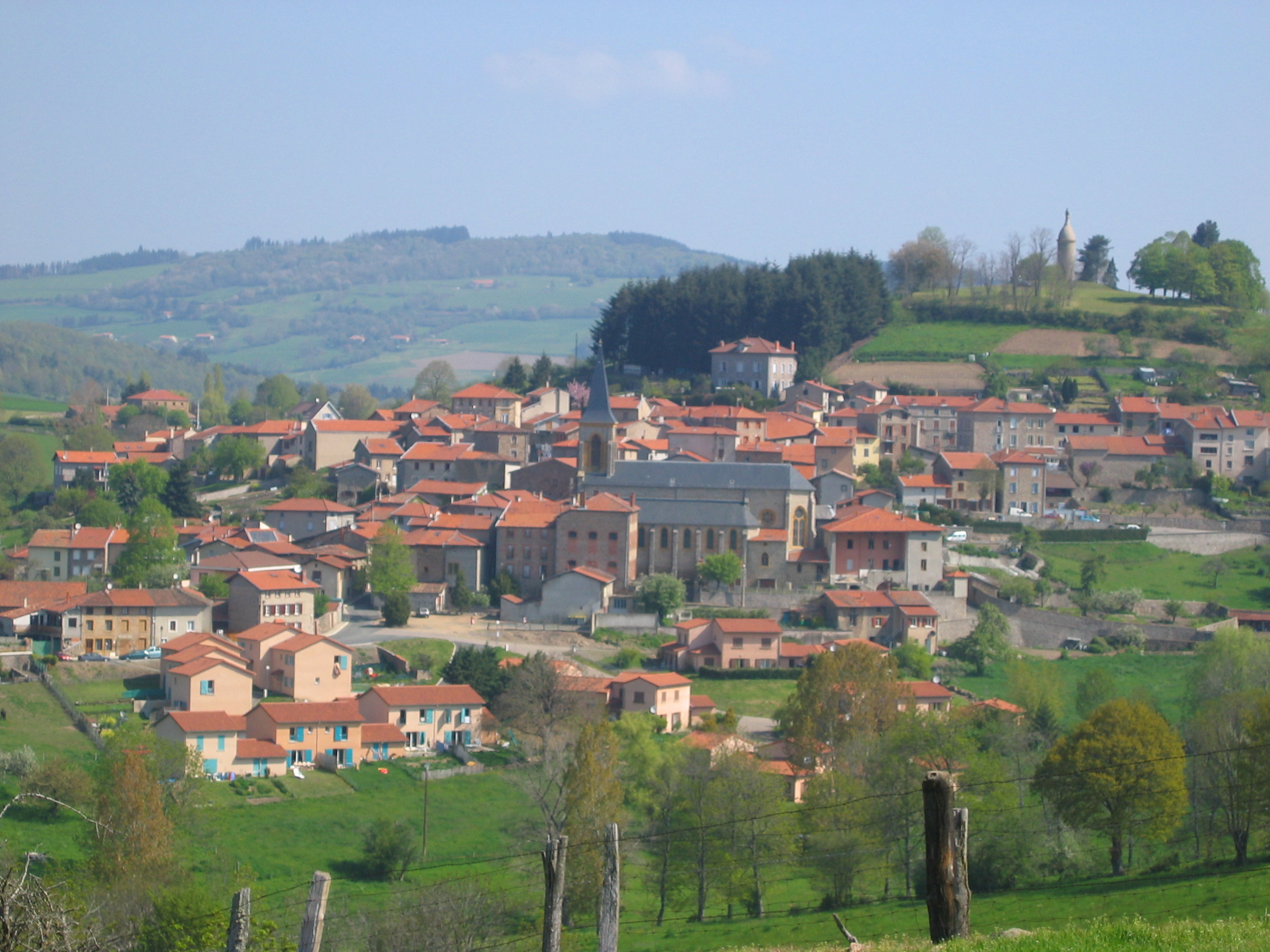
- A general view of Villechenève
- Location of Villechenève
- Location within France Location within Auvergne-Rhône-Alpes
- Coordinates: 45°48′49″N 4°24′25″E
- Country: France
- Region: Auvergne-Rhône-Alpes
- Department: Rhône
- Arrondissement: Lyon
- Canton: L'Arbresle
- Intercommunality: Monts du Lyonnais

Government
  - Mayor (2020–2026): Bernard Chazelles
- Area^{1}: 14.15 km^{2} (5.46 sq mi)
- Elevation: 780 m (2,560 ft)
- Highest elevation: 891 m (2,923 ft)
- Lowest elevation: 499 m (1,637 ft)
- Population (2023): 922
  - Density: 65.2/km^{2} (169/sq mi)
- Time zone: UTC+01:00 (CET)
  - Summer (DST): UTC+02:00 (CEST)
- INSEE/Postal code: 69263 /69770
- ^{1} French Land Register data, which excludes lakes, ponds, glaciers > 1 km^{2} (0.386 sq mi or 247 acres) and river estuaries.

Villechenève (French pronunciation: [vilʃənɛv]) is a commune in the Rhône department in eastern France.

== See also ==
- Communes of the Rhône department
