= Savigny, Rhône =

Savigny
- Commune
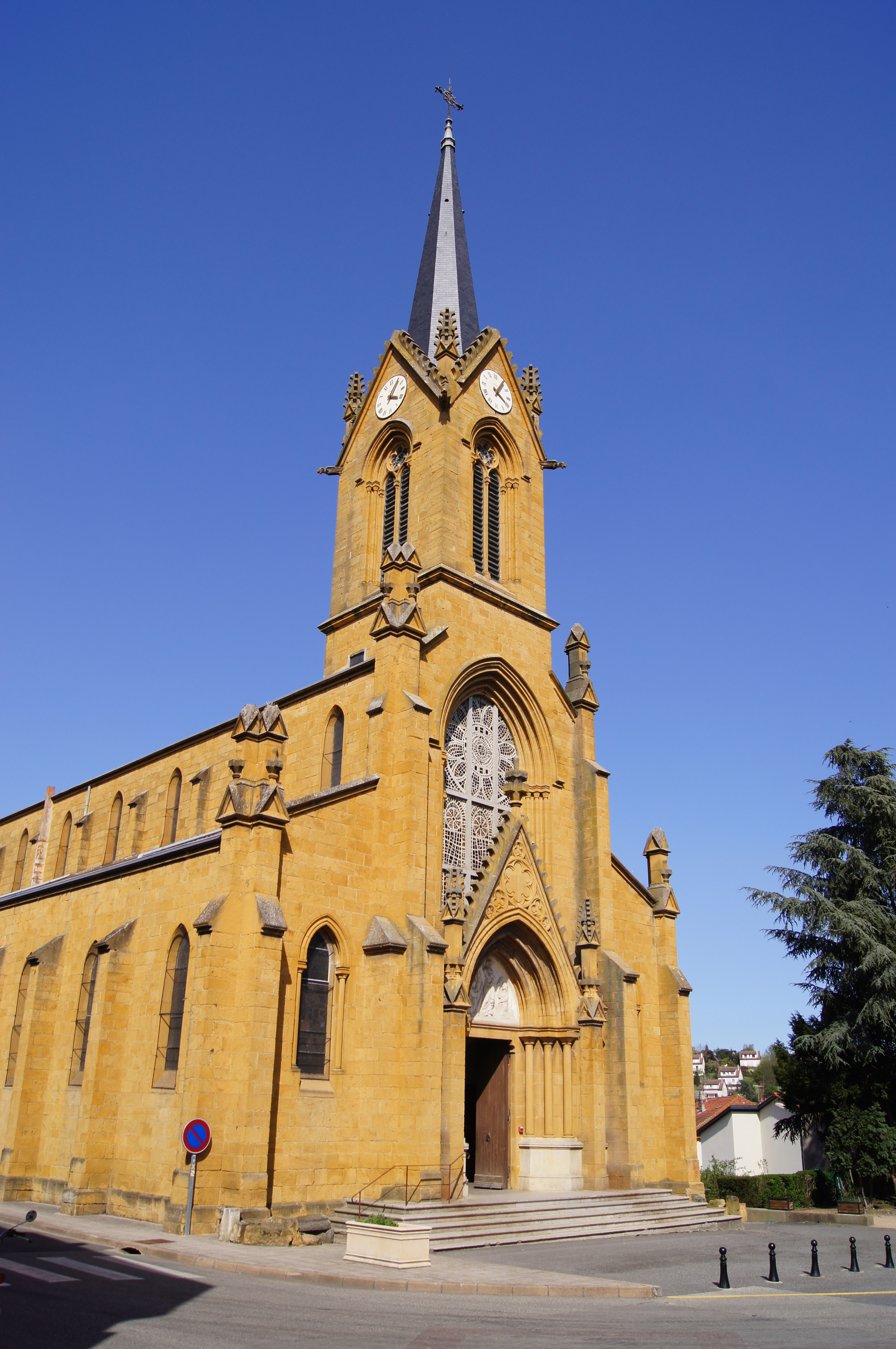
- The church in Savigny

- Coat of arms
- Location of Savigny
- Location within France Location within Auvergne-Rhône-Alpes
- Coordinates: 45°49′01″N 4°34′29″E
- Country: France
- Region: Auvergne-Rhône-Alpes
- Department: Rhône
- Arrondissement: Villefranche-sur-Saône
- Canton: L'Arbresle

Government
  - Mayor (2020–2026): Monique Laurent
- Area^{1}: 21.42 km^{2} (8.27 sq mi)
- Elevation: 290 m (950 ft)
- Highest elevation: 810 m (2,660 ft)
- Lowest elevation: 227 m (745 ft)
- Population (2023): 1,995
  - Density: 93.14/km^{2} (241.2/sq mi)
- Time zone: UTC+01:00 (CET)
  - Summer (DST): UTC+02:00 (CEST)
- INSEE/Postal code: 69175 /69210
- ^{1} French Land Register data, which excludes lakes, ponds, glaciers > 1 km^{2} (0.386 sq mi or 247 acres) and river estuaries.

Savigny (French pronunciation: [saviɲi]) is a commune in the Rhône department in eastern France.

Savigny was the site of the Abbey of Saint-Martin during the Middle Ages.

== See also ==
- Communes of the Rhône department
