= Brussieu =

Brussieu Borsié (Arpitan)
- Commune
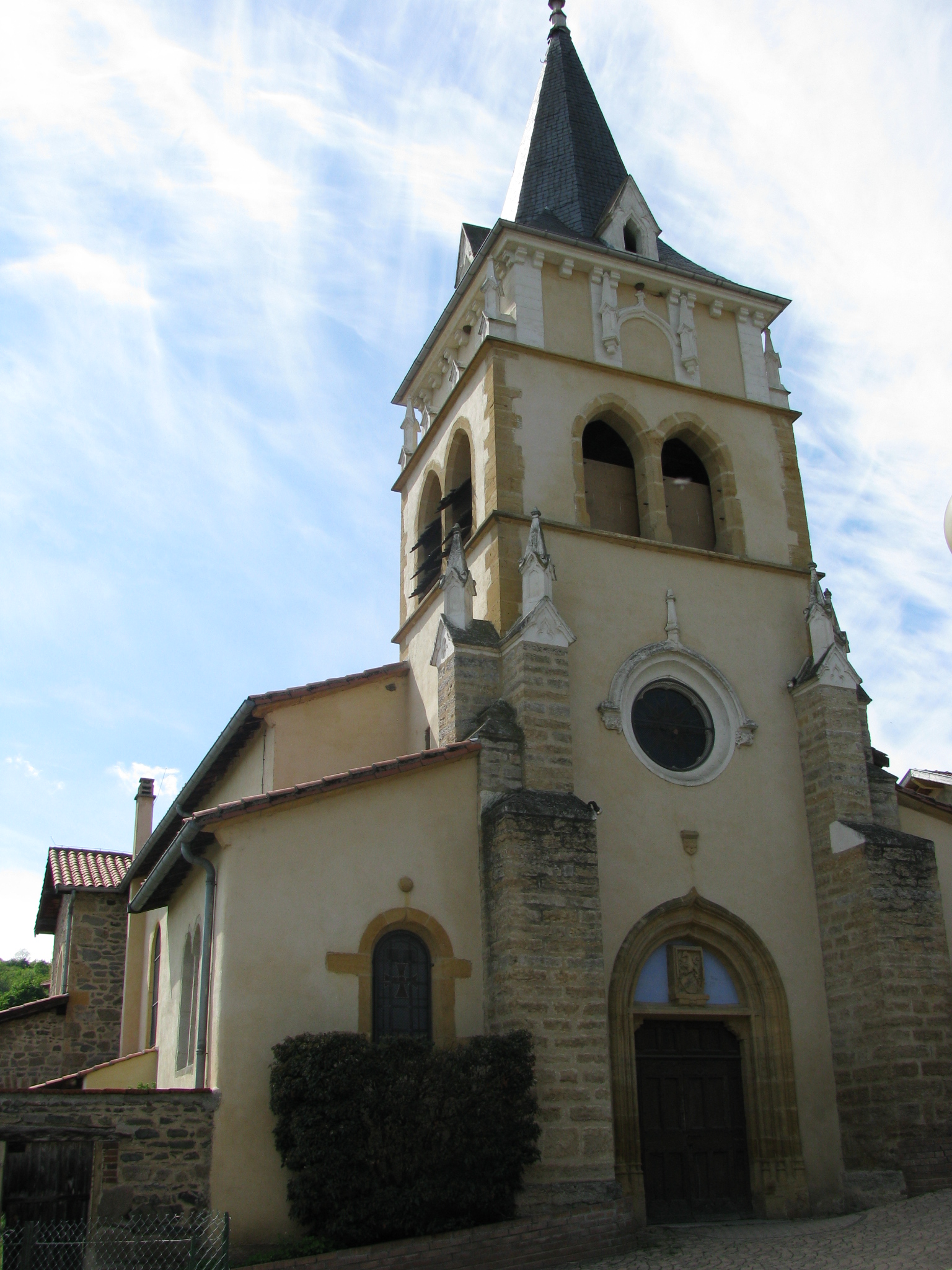
- The church in Brussieu

- Coat of arms
- Location of Brussieu
- Location within France Location within Auvergne-Rhône-Alpes
- Coordinates: 45°44′56″N 4°31′31″E
- Country: France
- Region: Auvergne-Rhône-Alpes
- Department: Rhône
- Arrondissement: Lyon
- Canton: L'Arbresle
- Intercommunality: Monts du Lyonnais

Government
  - Mayor (2020–2026): Catherine Lotte
- Area^{1}: 6.74 km^{2} (2.60 sq mi)
- Elevation: 420 m (1,380 ft)
- Highest elevation: 599 m (1,965 ft)
- Lowest elevation: 297 m (974 ft)
- Population (2023): 1,382
  - Density: 205/km^{2} (531/sq mi)
- Time zone: UTC+01:00 (CET)
  - Summer (DST): UTC+02:00 (CEST)
- INSEE/Postal code: 69031 /69690
- ^{1} French Land Register data, which excludes lakes, ponds, glaciers > 1 km^{2} (0.386 sq mi or 247 acres) and river estuaries.

Brussieu (French pronunciation: [bʁysjø]; Arpitan: Borsié [bɔr.ˈsi]) is a commune in the Rhône department in eastern France.

== See also ==
Communes of the Rhône department
