= Saint-Pierre-la-Palud =

- Commune
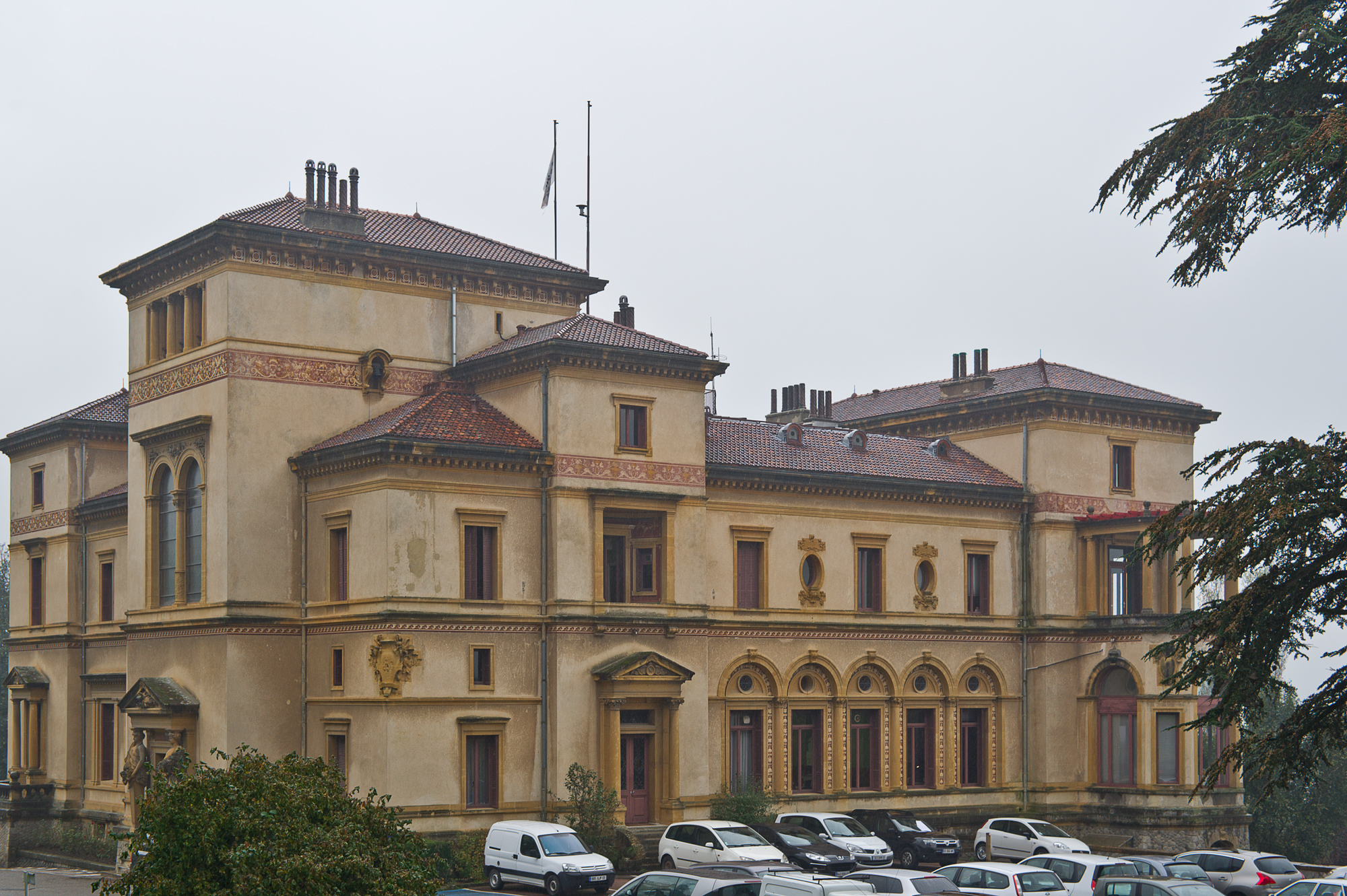
- The Villa La Pérolliere

- Coat of arms
- Location of Saint-Pierre-la-Palud
- Location within France Location within Auvergne-Rhône-Alpes
- Coordinates: 45°47′30″N 4°36′44″E
- Country: France
- Region: Auvergne-Rhône-Alpes
- Department: Rhône
- Arrondissement: Villefranche-sur-Saône
- Canton: L'Arbresle

Government
  - Mayor (2020–2026): Morgan Griffond
- Area^{1}: 7.53 km^{2} (2.91 sq mi)
- Elevation: 360 m (1,180 ft)
- Highest elevation: 747 m (2,451 ft)
- Lowest elevation: 259 m (850 ft)
- Population (2023): 2,616
  - Density: 347/km^{2} (900/sq mi)
- Time zone: UTC+01:00 (CET)
  - Summer (DST): UTC+02:00 (CEST)
- INSEE/Postal code: 69231 /69210
- ^{1} French Land Register data, which excludes lakes, ponds, glaciers > 1 km^{2} (0.386 sq mi or 247 acres) and river estuaries.

Saint-Pierre-la-Palud (French pronunciation: [sɛ̃ pjɛʁ la paly]) is a commune in the Rhône department in eastern France.

== Population ==
Historical population
Year	Pop.	±% p.a.
1968	1,385	—
1975	1,233	−1.65%
1982	1,546	+3.28%
1990	1,804	+1.95%
1999	1,983	+1.06%
2007	2,199	+1.30%
2012	2,607	+3.46%
2017	2,635	+0.21%
2023	2,616	−0.12%
Source: INSEE

== See also ==
- Communes of the Rhône department
