= L'Arbresle =

- Commune
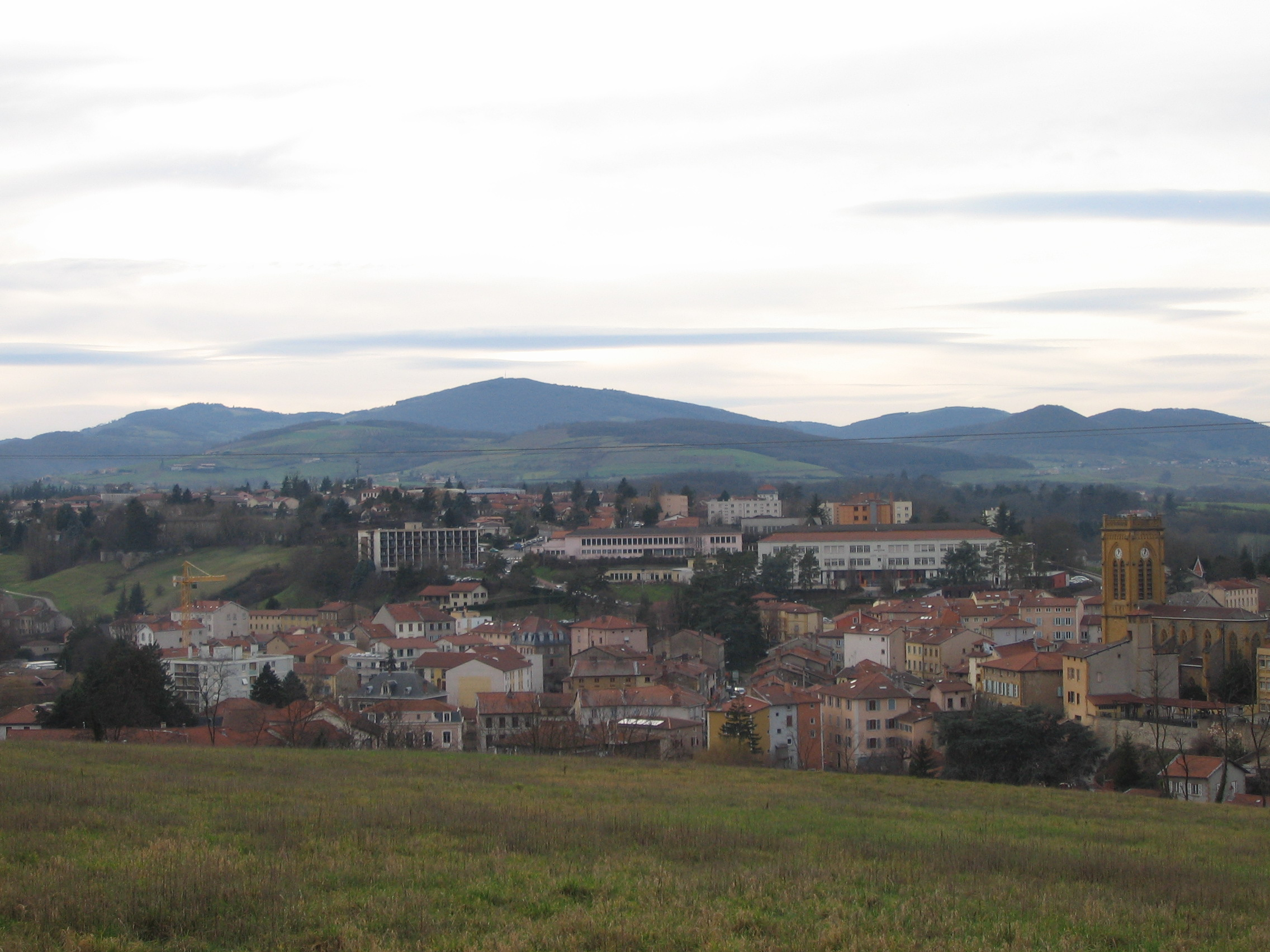
- General view of the town

- Coat of arms
- Location of L'Arbresle
- Location within France Location within Auvergne-Rhône-Alpes
- Coordinates: 45°50′11″N 4°37′04″E
- Country: France
- Region: Auvergne-Rhône-Alpes
- Department: Rhône
- Arrondissement: Villefranche-sur-Saône
- Canton: L'Arbresle
- Intercommunality: Pays de L'Arbresle

Government
  - Mayor (2020–2026): Pierre-Jean Zannettacci
- Area^{1}: 3.36 km^{2} (1.30 sq mi)
- Elevation: 231 m (758 ft)
- Highest elevation: 304 m (997 ft)
- Lowest elevation: 212 m (696 ft)
- Population (2023): 6,537
  - Density: 1,950/km^{2} (5,040/sq mi)
- Demonym(s): Arbreslois, Arbresloises
- Time zone: UTC+01:00 (CET)
  - Summer (DST): UTC+02:00 (CEST)
- INSEE/Postal code: 69010 /69210
- Website: mairie-larbresle.fr
- ^{1} French Land Register data, which excludes lakes, ponds, glaciers > 1 km^{2} (0.386 sq mi or 247 acres) and river estuaries.

L'Arbresle (French pronunciation: [laʁbʁɛl]) is a commune of the Rhône department, eastern France. Composer Claude Terrasse and inventor Barthélemy Thimonnier were born in L'Arbresle.

== Population ==
Historical population
Year	Pop.	±% p.a.
1968	3,966	—
1975	4,038	+0.26%
1982	4,784	+2.45%
1990	5,199	+1.05%
1999	5,777	+1.18%
2007	5,994	+0.46%
2012	6,161	+0.55%
2017	6,398	+0.76%
2023	6,537	+0.36%
Source: INSEE

== See also ==
- Communes of the Rhône department
