= Charentay =

- Commune
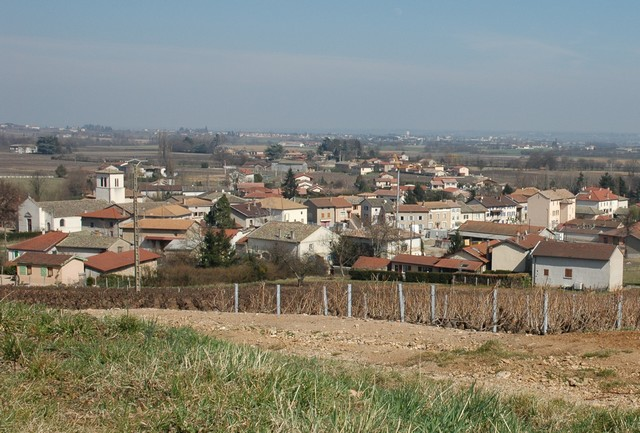
- A general view of Charentay

- Coat of arms
- Location of Charentay
- Location within France Location within Auvergne-Rhône-Alpes
- Coordinates: 46°05′23″N 4°40′48″E
- Country: France
- Region: Auvergne-Rhône-Alpes
- Department: Rhône
- Arrondissement: Villefranche-sur-Saône
- Canton: Belleville-en-Beaujolais
- Intercommunality: Saône-Beaujolais

Government
  - Mayor (2020–2026): Evelyne Jomard
- Area^{1}: 13.78 km^{2} (5.32 sq mi)
- Elevation: 250 m (820 ft)
- Highest elevation: 272 m (892 ft)
- Lowest elevation: 175 m (574 ft)
- Population (2023): 1,273
  - Density: 92.38/km^{2} (239.3/sq mi)
- Time zone: UTC+01:00 (CET)
  - Summer (DST): UTC+02:00 (CEST)
- INSEE/Postal code: 69045 /69220
- ^{1} French Land Register data, which excludes lakes, ponds, glaciers > 1 km^{2} (0.386 sq mi or 247 acres) and river estuaries.

Charentay (French pronunciation: [ʃaʁɑ̃tɛ]) is a commune in the Rhône department in eastern France.

== Places ==
The Castle of Arginy is located within the commune.

== See also ==
- Communes of the Rhône department
