= Longessaigne =

- Commune
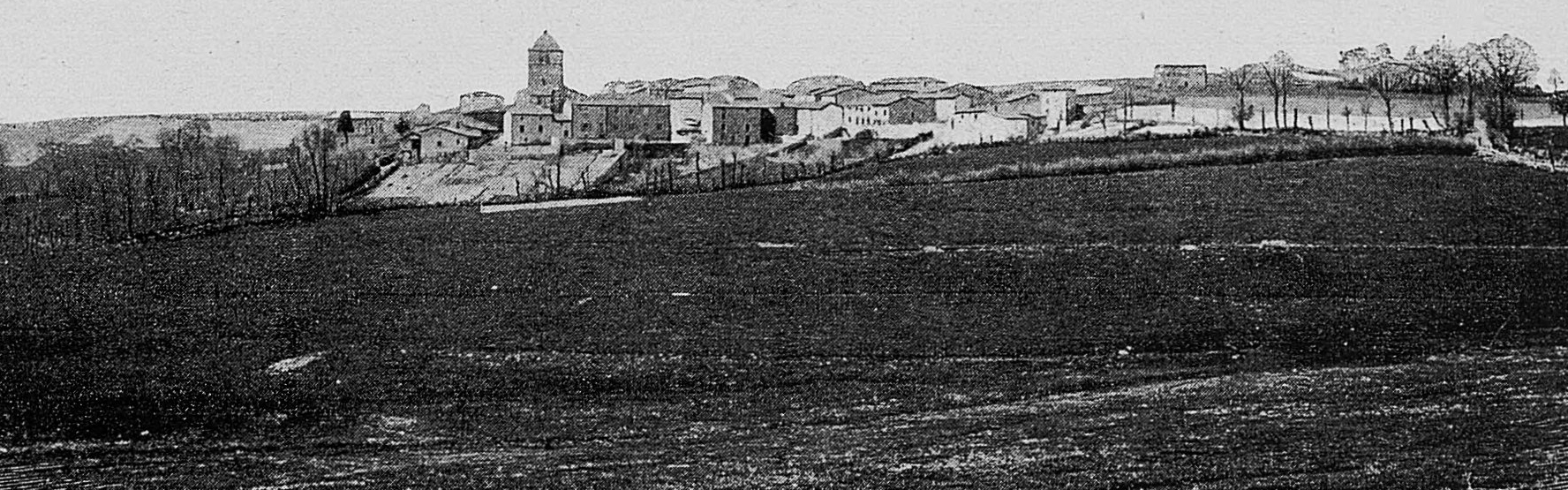
- A general view of Longessaigne, at the beginning of the 20th century
- Location of Longessaigne
- Location within France Location within Auvergne-Rhône-Alpes
- Coordinates: 45°47′33″N 4°25′29″E
- Country: France
- Region: Auvergne-Rhône-Alpes
- Department: Rhône
- Arrondissement: Lyon
- Canton: L'Arbresle
- Intercommunality: Monts du Lyonnais

Government
  - Mayor (2020–2026): Michel Rampon
- Area^{1}: 11.92 km^{2} (4.60 sq mi)
- Elevation: 700 m (2,300 ft)
- Highest elevation: 788 m (2,585 ft)
- Lowest elevation: 539 m (1,768 ft)
- Population (2023): 589
  - Density: 49.4/km^{2} (128/sq mi)
- Time zone: UTC+01:00 (CET)
  - Summer (DST): UTC+02:00 (CEST)
- INSEE/Postal code: 69120 /69770
- ^{1} French Land Register data, which excludes lakes, ponds, glaciers > 1 km^{2} (0.386 sq mi or 247 acres) and river estuaries.

Longessaigne is a commune in the Rhône department in eastern France.

== See also ==
- Communes of the Rhône department
