= Chevinay =

- Commune
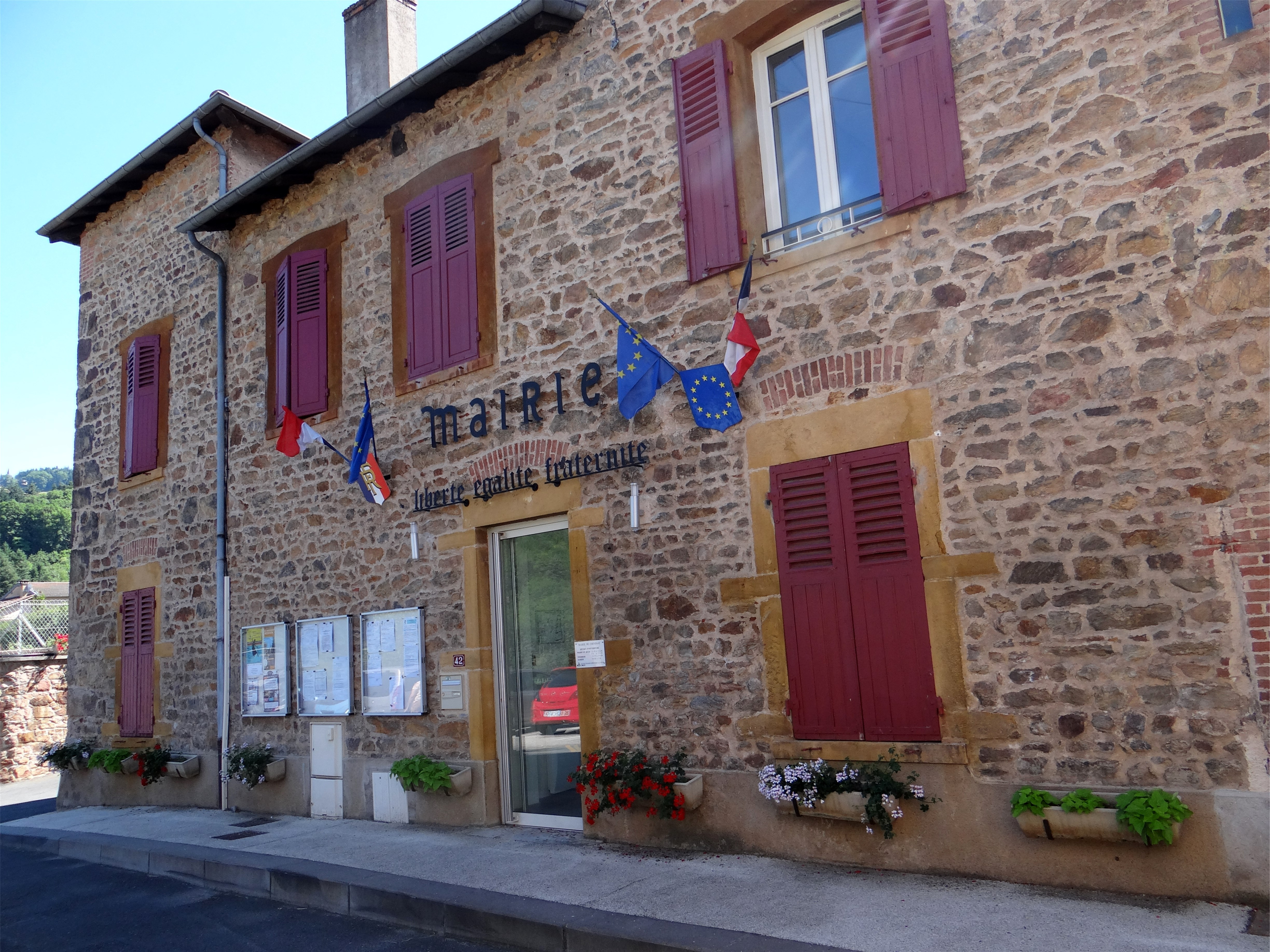
- Chevinay Town hall

- Coat of arms
- Location of Chevinay
- Location within France Location within Auvergne-Rhône-Alpes
- Coordinates: 45°46′16″N 4°36′30″E
- Country: France
- Region: Auvergne-Rhône-Alpes
- Department: Rhône
- Arrondissement: Villefranche-sur-Saône
- Canton: L'Arbresle
- Intercommunality: Pays de L'Arbresle

Government
  - Mayor (2020–2026): Richard Chermette
- Area^{1}: 8.82 km^{2} (3.41 sq mi)
- Elevation: 500 m (1,600 ft)
- Highest elevation: 760 m (2,490 ft)
- Lowest elevation: 245 m (804 ft)
- Population (2023): 580
  - Density: 66/km^{2} (170/sq mi)
- Time zone: UTC+01:00 (CET)
  - Summer (DST): UTC+02:00 (CEST)
- INSEE/Postal code: 69057 /69210
- ^{1} French Land Register data, which excludes lakes, ponds, glaciers > 1 km^{2} (0.386 sq mi or 247 acres) and river estuaries.

Chevinay (French pronunciation: [ʃəvinɛ]) is a commune in the Rhône department in eastern France.

== See also ==
- Communes of the Rhône department
