= Saint-Clément-les-Places =

- Commune
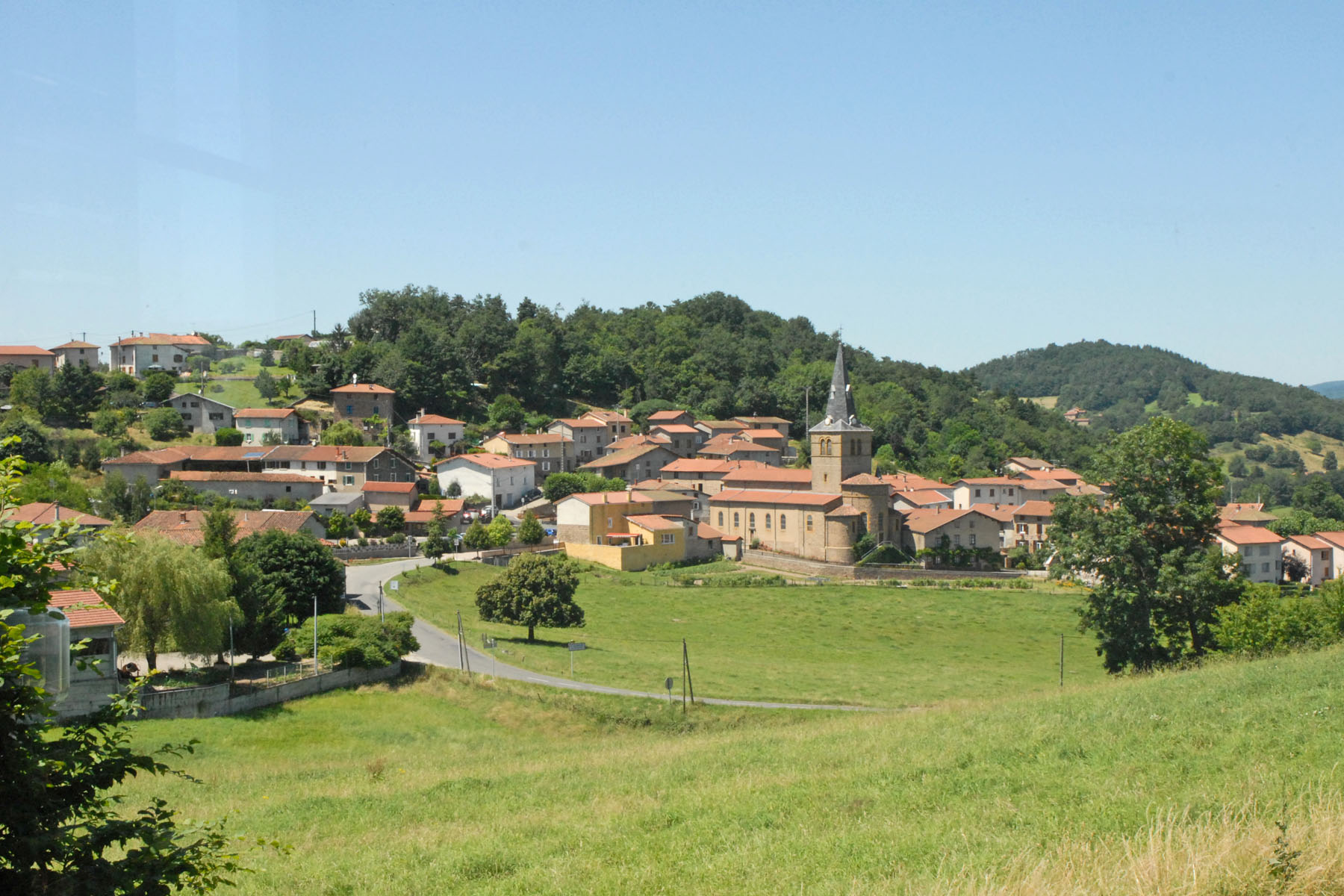
- The church and surrounding buildings in Saint-Clément-les-Places
- Location of Saint-Clément-les-Places
- Location within France Location within Auvergne-Rhône-Alpes
- Coordinates: 45°45′13″N 4°25′27″E
- Country: France
- Region: Auvergne-Rhône-Alpes
- Department: Rhône
- Arrondissement: Lyon
- Canton: L'Arbresle
- Intercommunality: Monts du Lyonnais

Government
  - Mayor (2020–2026): Patricia Blein
- Area^{1}: 12.42 km^{2} (4.80 sq mi)
- Elevation: 650 m (2,130 ft)
- Highest elevation: 713 m (2,339 ft)
- Lowest elevation: 536 m (1,759 ft)
- Population (2023): 684
  - Density: 55.1/km^{2} (143/sq mi)
- Time zone: UTC+01:00 (CET)
  - Summer (DST): UTC+02:00 (CEST)
- INSEE/Postal code: 69187 /69930
- ^{1} French Land Register data, which excludes lakes, ponds, glaciers > 1 km^{2} (0.386 sq mi or 247 acres) and river estuaries.

Saint-Clément-les-Places (French pronunciation: [sɛ̃ klemɑ̃ le plas]) is a commune in the Rhône department in eastern France.

== Demography ==
Historical population
Year	Pop.	±% p.a.
1968	529	—
1975	508	−0.58%
1982	426	−2.48%
1990	473	+1.32%
1999	536	+1.40%
2007	643	+2.30%
2012	616	−0.85%
2017	640	+0.77%
2023	684	+1.11%
Source: INSEE

== See also ==
- Communes of the Rhône department
