= Sourcieux-les-Mines =

- Commune
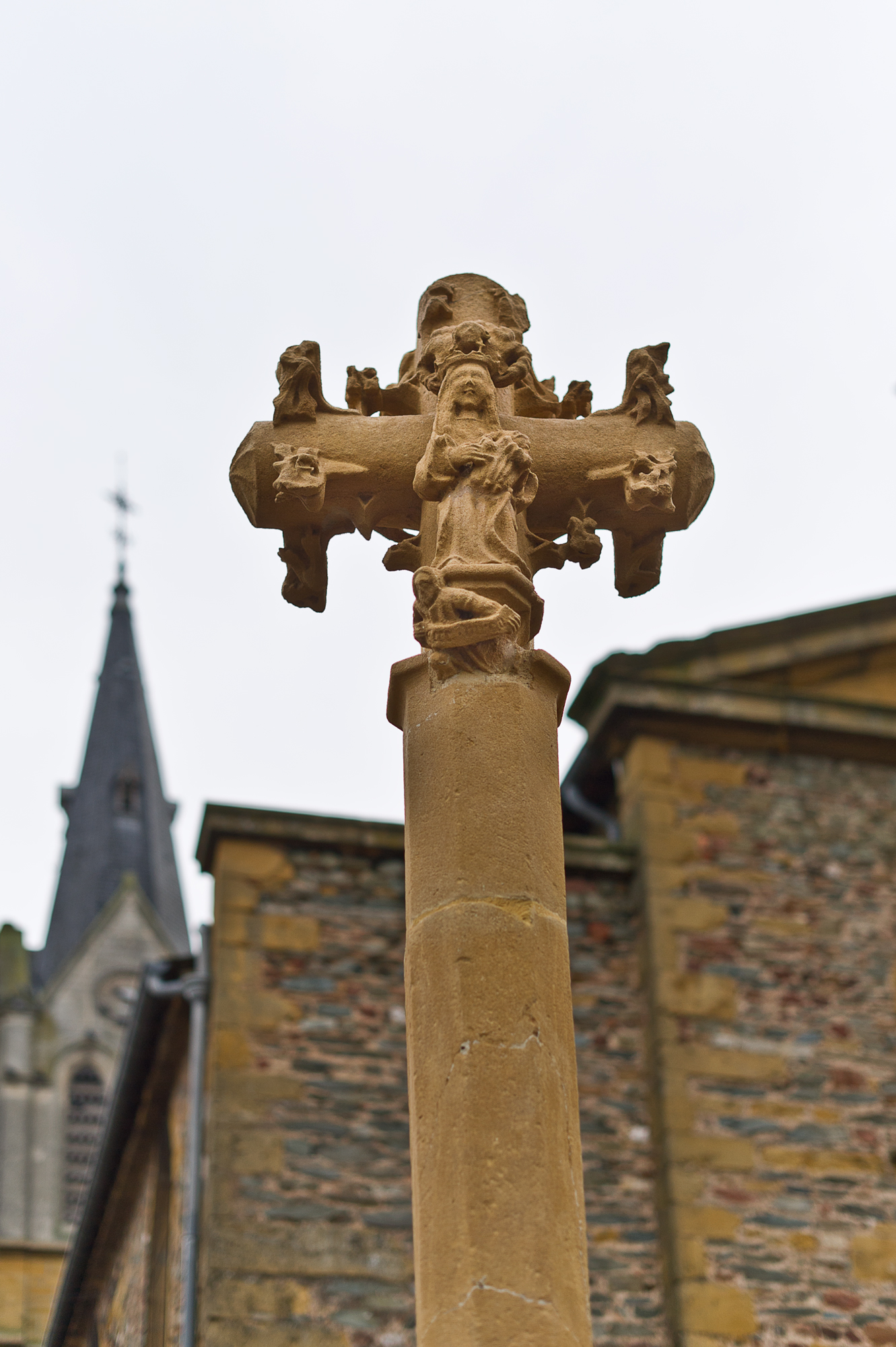
- Monumental cross of the 15th century, historical monument since 1926, in front of the church

- Coat of arms
- Location of Sourcieux-les-Mines
- Location within France Location within Auvergne-Rhône-Alpes
- Coordinates: 45°48′25″N 4°37′24″E
- Country: France
- Region: Auvergne-Rhône-Alpes
- Department: Rhône
- Arrondissement: Villefranche-sur-Saône
- Canton: L'Arbresle
- Intercommunality: Pays de L'Arbresle

Government
  - Mayor (2020–2026): Guillaume Arnold
- Area^{1}: 9.96 km^{2} (3.85 sq mi)
- Elevation: 400 m (1,300 ft)
- Highest elevation: 660 m (2,170 ft)
- Lowest elevation: 260 m (850 ft)
- Population (2023): 2,100
  - Density: 210/km^{2} (550/sq mi)
- Time zone: UTC+01:00 (CET)
  - Summer (DST): UTC+02:00 (CEST)
- INSEE/Postal code: 69177 /69210
- ^{1} French Land Register data, which excludes lakes, ponds, glaciers > 1 km^{2} (0.386 sq mi or 247 acres) and river estuaries.

Sourcieux-les-Mines (French pronunciation: [suʁsjø le min]) is a commune in the Rhône department in eastern France.

== Population ==
Historical population
Year	Pop.	±% p.a.
1968	794	—
1975	834	+0.70%
1982	1,156	+4.77%
1990	1,349	+1.95%
1999	1,762	+3.01%
2007	1,887	+0.86%
2012	1,963	+0.79%
2017	2,029	+0.66%
2023	2,100	+0.57%
Source: INSEE

== See also ==
- Communes of the Rhône department
