= Éveux =

- Commune
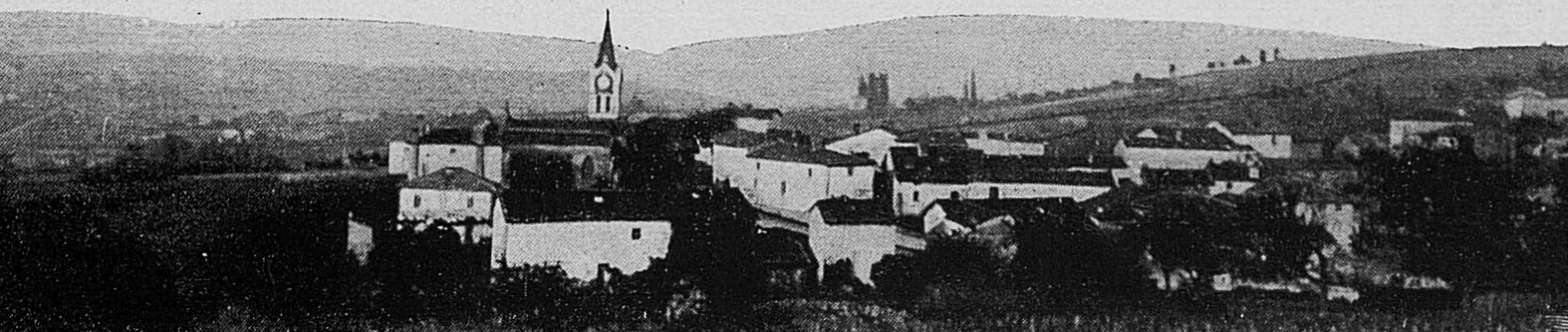
- A general view of Éveux, at the beginning of the 20th century

- Coat of arms
- Location of Éveux
- Location within France Location within Auvergne-Rhône-Alpes
- Coordinates: 45°49′38″N 4°37′24″E
- Country: France
- Region: Auvergne-Rhône-Alpes
- Department: Rhône
- Arrondissement: Villefranche-sur-Saône
- Canton: L'Arbresle
- Intercommunality: CC du Pays de L'Arbresle

Government
  - Mayor (2020–2026): Bertrand Gonin
- Area^{1}: 3.32 km^{2} (1.28 sq mi)
- Elevation: 310 m (1,020 ft)
- Highest elevation: 426 m (1,398 ft)
- Lowest elevation: 221 m (725 ft)
- Population (2023): 1,160
  - Density: 349/km^{2} (905/sq mi)
- Time zone: UTC+01:00 (CET)
  - Summer (DST): UTC+02:00 (CEST)
- INSEE/Postal code: 69083 /69210
- Website: eveux.fr
- ^{1} French Land Register data, which excludes lakes, ponds, glaciers > 1 km^{2} (0.386 sq mi or 247 acres) and river estuaries.

Éveux (French pronunciation: [evø]) is a commune in the Rhône department in eastern France.

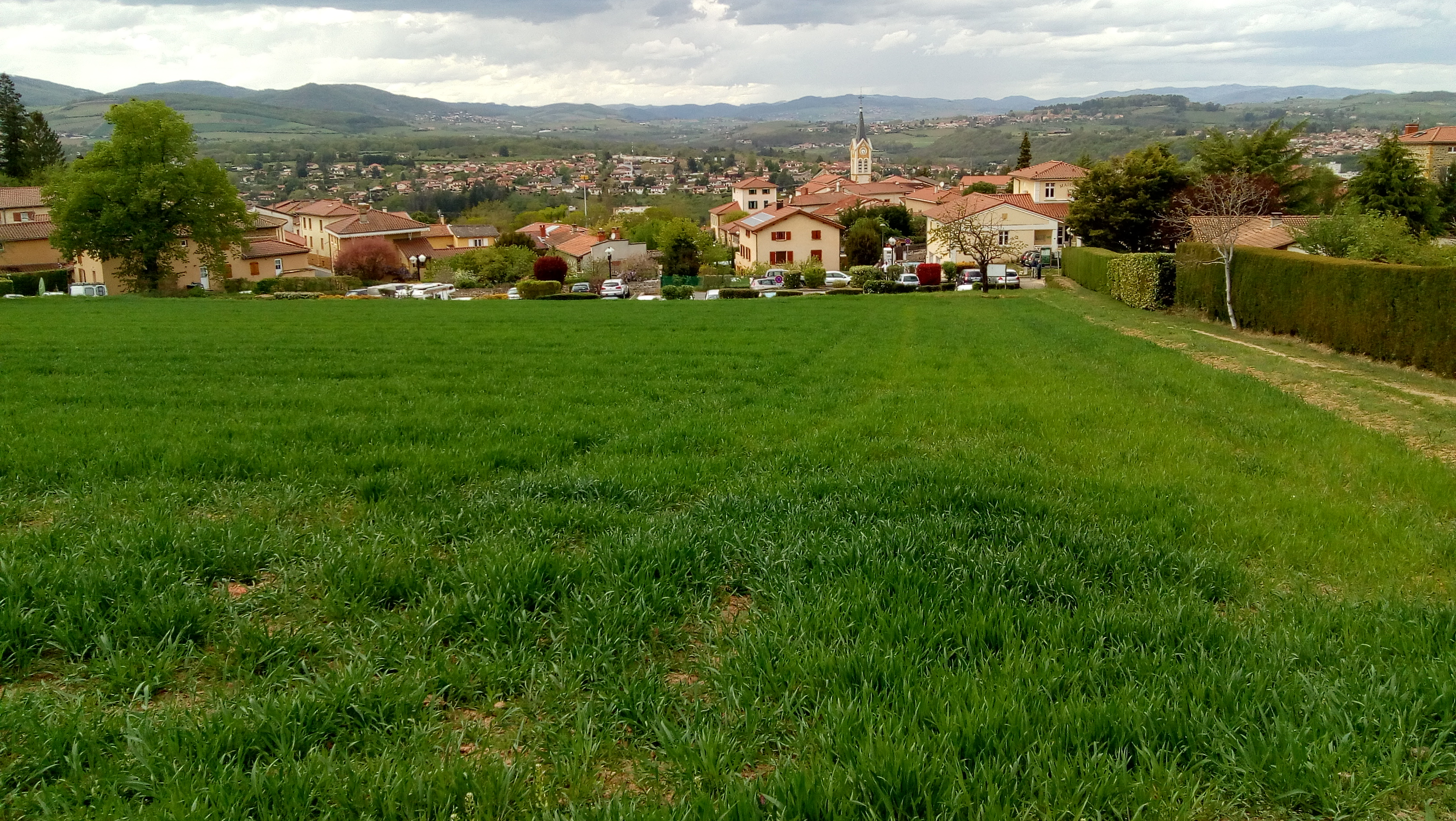
The village of Éveux in 2019

== See also ==
- Sainte Marie de La Tourette
- Communes of the Rhône department
