= Saint-Laurent-de-Chamousset =

- Commune
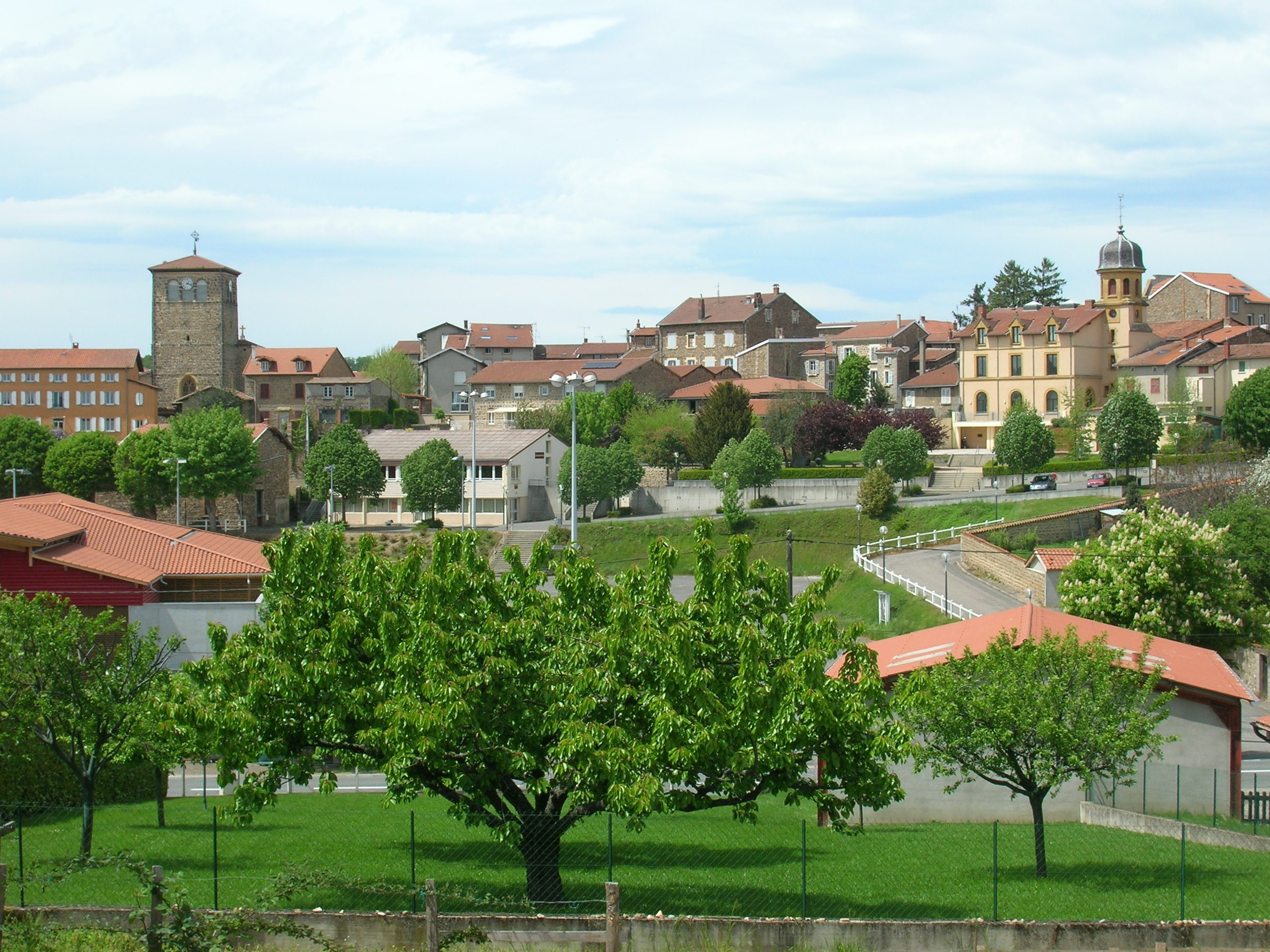
- A view within Saint-Laurent-de-Chamousset

- Coat of arms
- Location of Saint-Laurent-de-Chamousset
- Location within France Location within Auvergne-Rhône-Alpes
- Coordinates: 45°44′21″N 4°27′54″E
- Country: France
- Region: Auvergne-Rhône-Alpes
- Department: Rhône
- Arrondissement: Lyon
- Canton: L'Arbresle

Government
  - Mayor (2020–2026): Pierre Varliette
- Area^{1}: 17.25 km^{2} (6.66 sq mi)
- Elevation: 630 m (2,070 ft)
- Highest elevation: 691 m (2,267 ft)
- Lowest elevation: 384 m (1,260 ft)
- Population (2023): 2,017
  - Density: 116.9/km^{2} (302.8/sq mi)
- Time zone: UTC+01:00 (CET)
  - Summer (DST): UTC+02:00 (CEST)
- INSEE/Postal code: 69220 /69930
- ^{1} French Land Register data, which excludes lakes, ponds, glaciers > 1 km^{2} (0.386 sq mi or 247 acres) and river estuaries.

Saint-Laurent-de-Chamousset (French pronunciation: [sɛ̃ loʁɑ̃ də ʃamusɛ]) is a commune in the Rhône department in eastern France.

== Population ==
Historical population
Year	Pop.	±% p.a.
1968	1,313	—
1975	1,356	+0.46%
1982	1,406	+0.52%
1990	1,558	+1.29%
1999	1,703	+0.99%
2007	1,856	+1.08%
2012	1,922	+0.70%
2017	1,827	−1.01%
2023	2,017	+1.66%
Source: INSEE

== See also ==
- Communes of the Rhône department
