= Haute-Rivoire =

- Commune
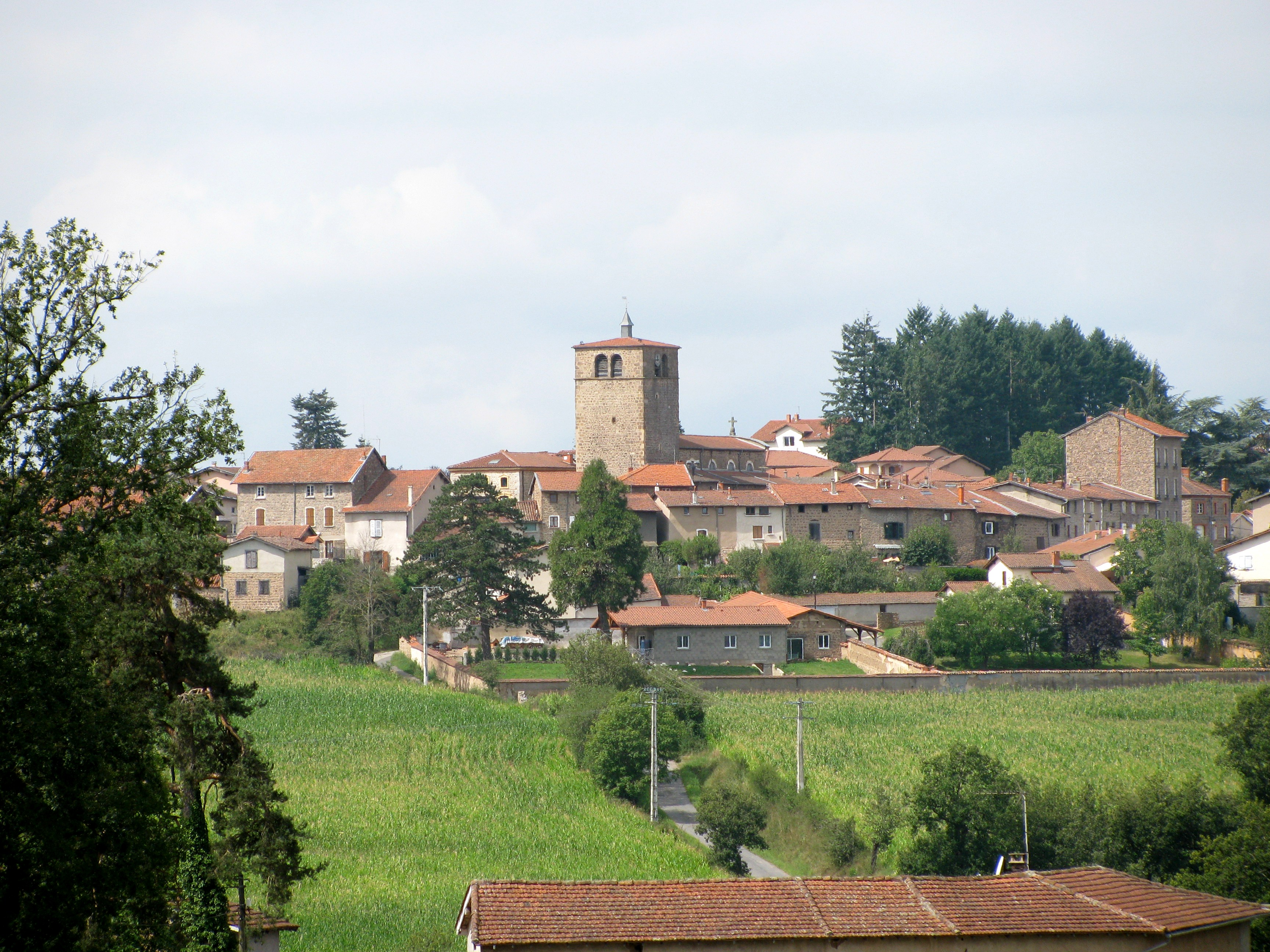
- The church and surrounding buildings in Haute-Rivoire
- Location of Haute-Rivoire
- Location within France Location within Auvergne-Rhône-Alpes
- Coordinates: 45°42′59″N 4°23′50″E
- Country: France
- Region: Auvergne-Rhône-Alpes
- Department: Rhône
- Arrondissement: Lyon
- Canton: L'Arbresle
- Intercommunality: Monts du Lyonnais

Government
  - Mayor (2020–2026): Nicolas Mure
- Area^{1}: 20.29 km^{2} (7.83 sq mi)
- Elevation: 630 m (2,070 ft)
- Highest elevation: 667 m (2,188 ft)
- Lowest elevation: 437 m (1,434 ft)
- Population (2023): 1,430
  - Density: 70.5/km^{2} (183/sq mi)
- Time zone: UTC+01:00 (CET)
  - Summer (DST): UTC+02:00 (CEST)
- INSEE/Postal code: 69099 /69610
- ^{1} French Land Register data, which excludes lakes, ponds, glaciers > 1 km^{2} (0.386 sq mi or 247 acres) and river estuaries.

Haute-Rivoire is a commune in the Rhône department in eastern France.

== See also ==
- Communes of the Rhône department
