= Courzieu =

- Commune
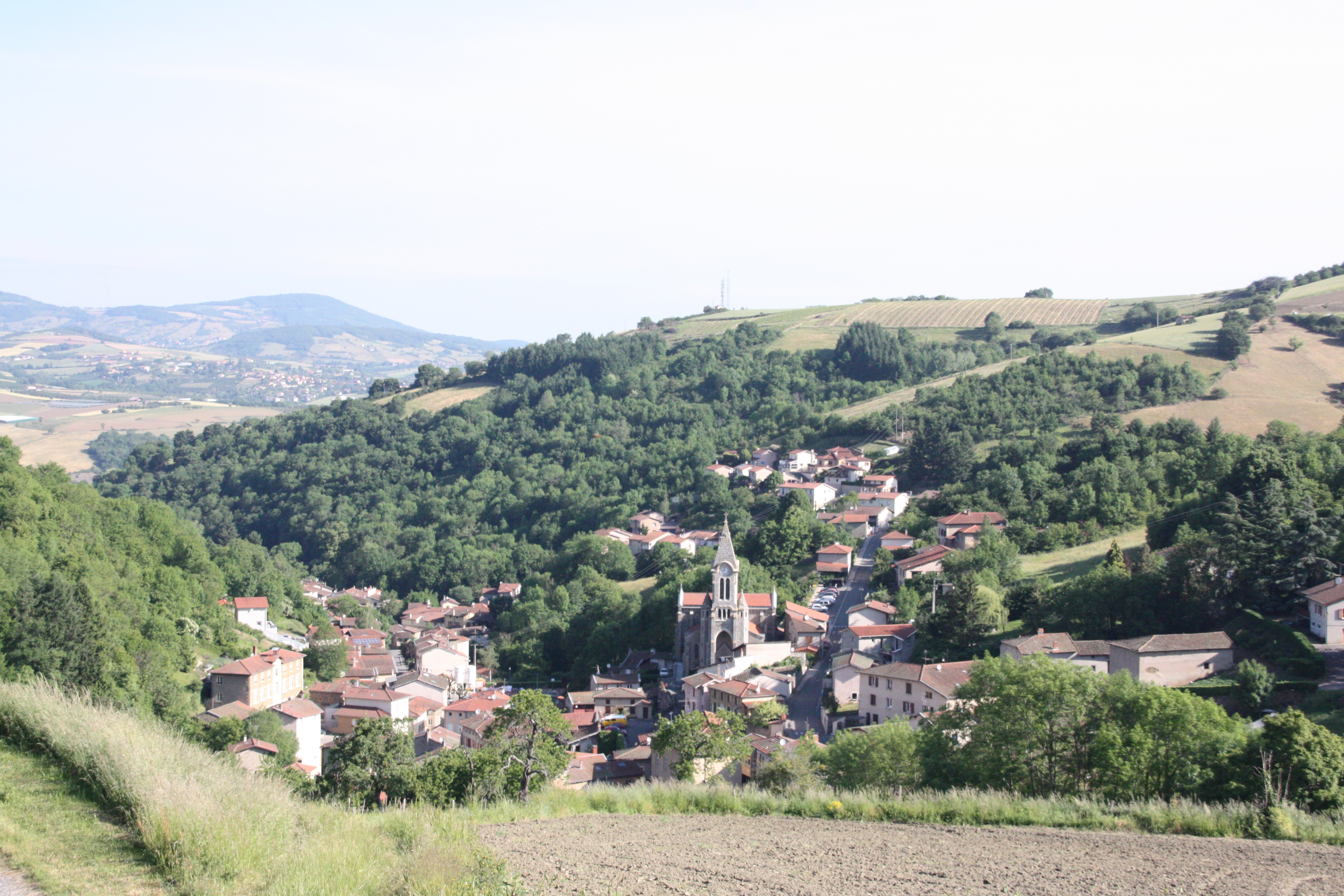
- The church and surrounding buildings in Courzieu

- Coat of arms
- Location of Courzieu
- Location within France Location within Auvergne-Rhône-Alpes
- Coordinates: 45°44′37″N 4°34′18″E
- Country: France
- Region: Auvergne-Rhône-Alpes
- Department: Rhône
- Arrondissement: Villefranche-sur-Saône
- Canton: L'Arbresle
- Intercommunality: CC du Pays de l'Arbresle

Government
  - Mayor (2020–2026): Jean-Bernard Cherblanc
- Area^{1}: 27 km^{2} (10 sq mi)
- Elevation: 600 m (2,000 ft)
- Highest elevation: 908 m (2,979 ft)
- Lowest elevation: 269 m (883 ft)
- Population (2023): 1,183
  - Density: 44/km^{2} (110/sq mi)
- Time zone: UTC+01:00 (CET)
  - Summer (DST): UTC+02:00 (CEST)
- INSEE/Postal code: 69067 /69690
- ^{1} French Land Register data, which excludes lakes, ponds, glaciers > 1 km^{2} (0.386 sq mi or 247 acres) and river estuaries.

Courzieu (French pronunciation: [kuʁzjø]) is a commune in the Rhône department in eastern France.

== See also ==
- Communes of the Rhône department
