= Montromant =

- Commune
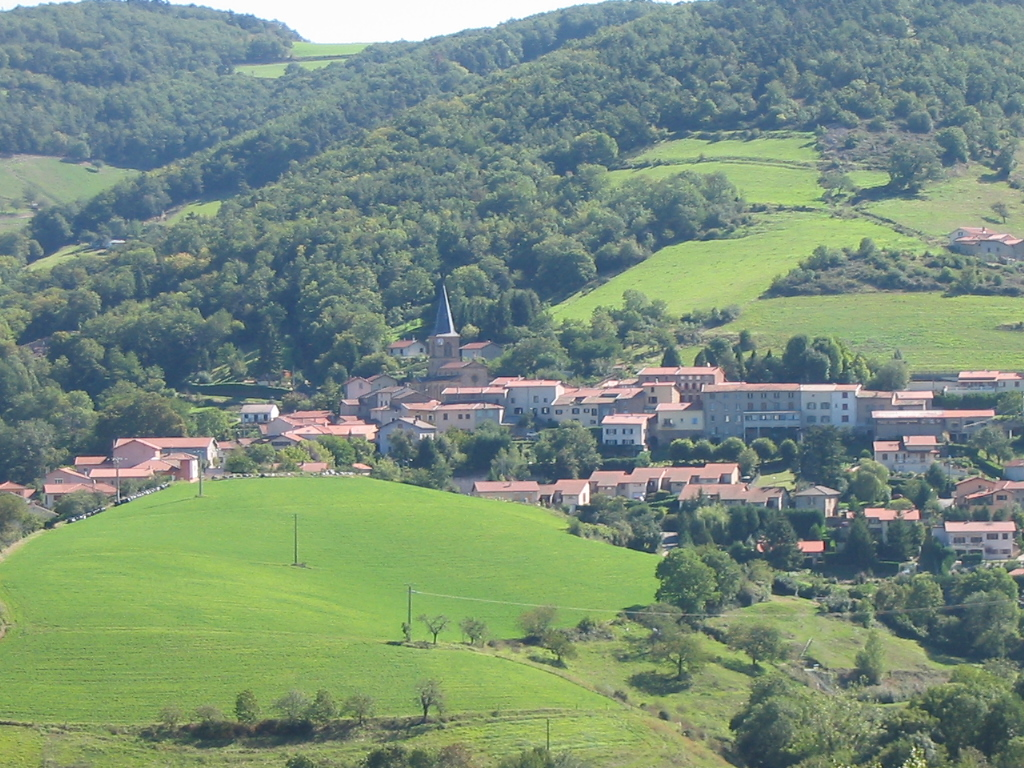
- A general view of Montromant
- Location of Montromant
- Location within France Location within Auvergne-Rhône-Alpes
- Coordinates: 45°42′32″N 4°31′35″E
- Country: France
- Region: Auvergne-Rhône-Alpes
- Department: Rhône
- Arrondissement: Lyon
- Canton: L'Arbresle
- Intercommunality: Monts du Lyonnais

Government
  - Mayor (2020–2026): Marie-Charles Jeanne
- Area^{1}: 10.99 km^{2} (4.24 sq mi)
- Elevation: 614 m (2,014 ft)
- Highest elevation: 911 m (2,989 ft)
- Lowest elevation: 370 m (1,210 ft)
- Population (2023): 456
  - Density: 41.5/km^{2} (107/sq mi)
- Time zone: UTC+01:00 (CET)
  - Summer (DST): UTC+02:00 (CEST)
- INSEE/Postal code: 69138 /69610
- ^{1} French Land Register data, which excludes lakes, ponds, glaciers > 1 km^{2} (0.386 sq mi or 247 acres) and river estuaries.

Montromant (French pronunciation: [mɔ̃ʁɔmɑ̃]) is a commune in the Rhône department in eastern France.

== See also ==
- Communes of the Rhône department
