= Sain-Bel =

- Commune
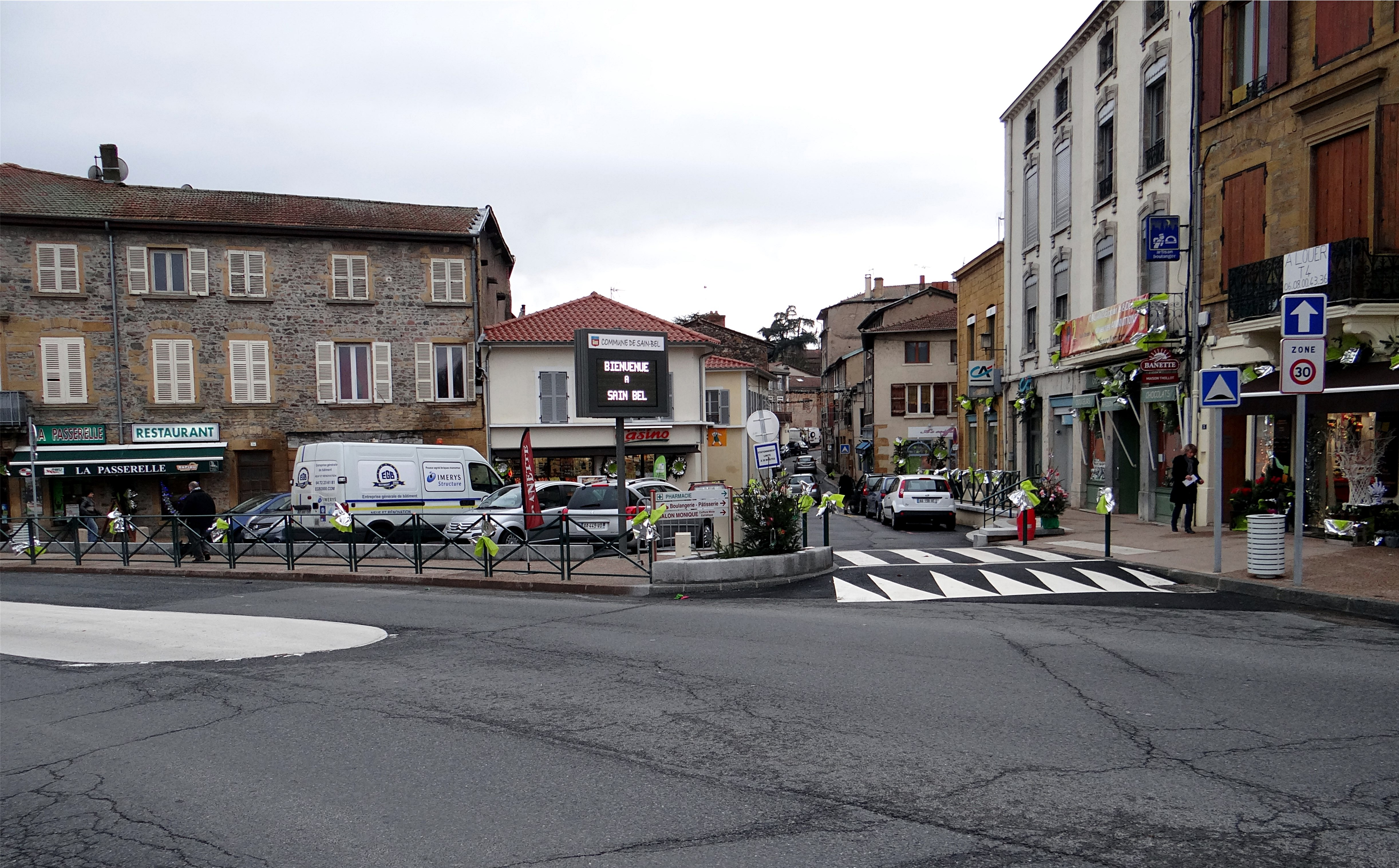
- The centre of Sain-Bel

- Coat of arms
- Location of Sain-Bel
- Location within France Location within Auvergne-Rhône-Alpes
- Coordinates: 45°48′39″N 4°35′55″E
- Country: France
- Region: Auvergne-Rhône-Alpes
- Department: Rhône
- Arrondissement: Villefranche-sur-Saône
- Canton: L'Arbresle

Government
  - Mayor (2020–2026): Raymond Revellin-Clerc
- Area^{1}: 3.68 km^{2} (1.42 sq mi)
- Elevation: 240 m (790 ft)
- Highest elevation: 351 m (1,152 ft)
- Lowest elevation: 228 m (748 ft)
- Population (2023): 2,566
  - Density: 697/km^{2} (1,810/sq mi)
- Time zone: UTC+01:00 (CET)
  - Summer (DST): UTC+02:00 (CEST)
- INSEE/Postal code: 69171 /69210
- ^{1} French Land Register data, which excludes lakes, ponds, glaciers > 1 km^{2} (0.386 sq mi or 247 acres) and river estuaries.

Sain-Bel (French pronunciation: [sɛ̃ bɛl]) is a commune in the Rhône department in eastern France.

== Population ==
Historical population
Year	Pop.	±% p.a.
1968	1,798	—
1975	1,605	−1.61%
1982	1,761	+1.33%
1990	1,892	+0.90%
1999	1,919	+0.16%
2007	2,153	+1.45%
2012	2,271	+1.07%
2017	2,316	+0.39%
2023	2,566	+1.72%
Source: INSEE

== See also ==
- Communes of the Rhône department
