= Chambost-Longessaigne =

- Commune
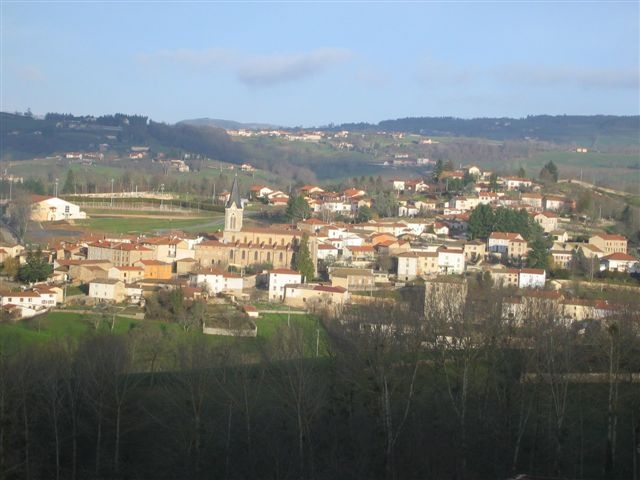
- A general view of Chambost

- Coat of arms
- Location of Chambost-Longessaigne
- Location within France Location within Auvergne-Rhône-Alpes
- Coordinates: 45°46′25″N 4°22′11″E
- Country: France
- Region: Auvergne-Rhône-Alpes
- Department: Rhône
- Arrondissement: Lyon
- Canton: L'Arbresle
- Intercommunality: Monts du Lyonnais

Government
  - Mayor (2020–2026): Marie-Luce Arnoux
- Area^{1}: 15.44 km^{2} (5.96 sq mi)
- Elevation: 600 m (2,000 ft)
- Highest elevation: 681 m (2,234 ft)
- Lowest elevation: 477 m (1,565 ft)
- Population (2023): 930
  - Density: 60/km^{2} (160/sq mi)
- Time zone: UTC+01:00 (CET)
  - Summer (DST): UTC+02:00 (CEST)
- INSEE/Postal code: 69038 /69770
- ^{1} French Land Register data, which excludes lakes, ponds, glaciers > 1 km^{2} (0.386 sq mi or 247 acres) and river estuaries.

Chambost-Longessaigne is a commune in the Rhône department in eastern France.

== See also ==
- Communes of the Rhône department
