= Bibost =

- Commune
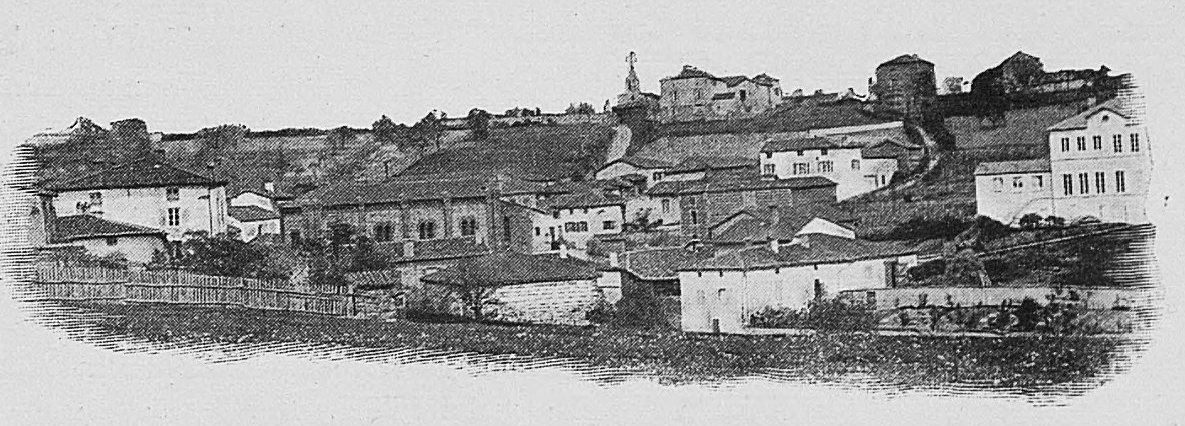
- Bibost at the beginning of the 20th century

- Coat of arms
- Location of Bibost
- Location within France Location within Auvergne-Rhône-Alpes
- Coordinates: 45°47′54″N 4°32′48″E
- Country: France
- Region: Auvergne-Rhône-Alpes
- Department: Rhône
- Arrondissement: Villefranche-sur-Saône
- Canton: L'Arbresle
- Intercommunality: Pays de l'Arbresle

Government
  - Mayor (2020–2026): Franck Chaverot
- Area^{1}: 5.23 km^{2} (2.02 sq mi)
- Elevation: 420 m (1,380 ft)
- Highest elevation: 584 m (1,916 ft)
- Lowest elevation: 279 m (915 ft)
- Population (2023): 538
  - Density: 103/km^{2} (266/sq mi)
- Time zone: UTC+01:00 (CET)
  - Summer (DST): UTC+02:00 (CEST)
- INSEE/Postal code: 69022 /69690
- ^{1} French Land Register data, which excludes lakes, ponds, glaciers > 1 km^{2} (0.386 sq mi or 247 acres) and river estuaries.

Bibost is a commune of the Rhône department in eastern France.

== See also ==
- Communes of the Rhône department
