= Brullioles =

- Commune
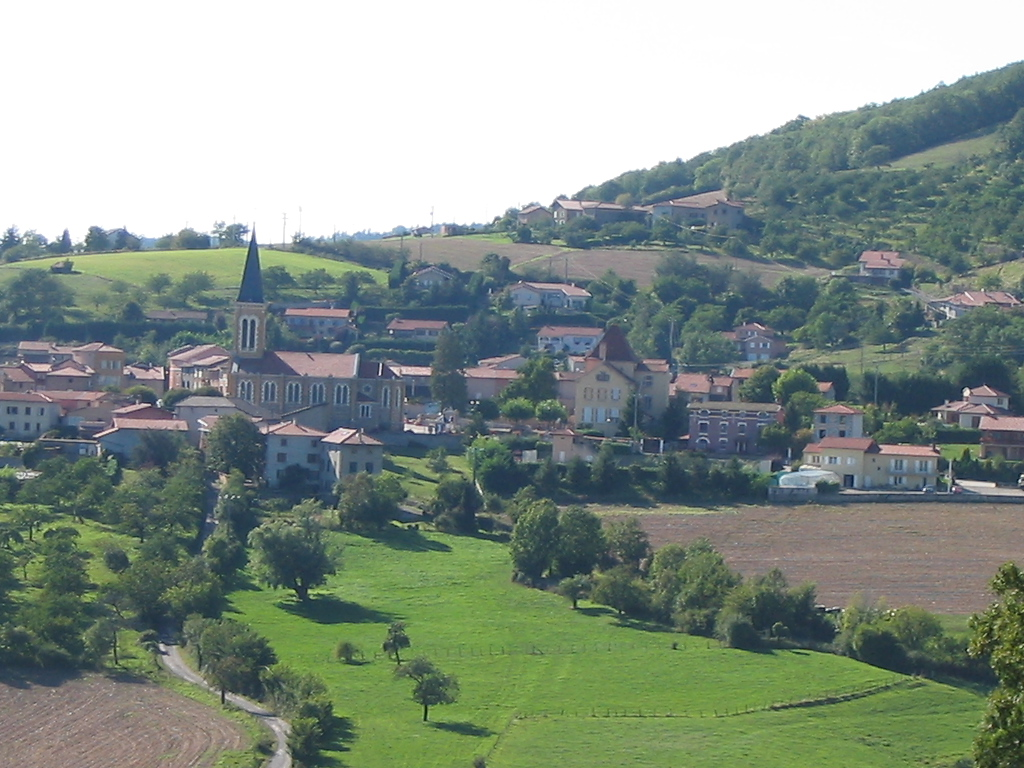
- A general view of Brullioles

- Coat of arms
- Location of Brullioles
- Location within France Location within Auvergne-Rhône-Alpes
- Coordinates: 45°45′43″N 4°30′00″E
- Country: France
- Region: Auvergne-Rhône-Alpes
- Department: Rhône
- Arrondissement: Lyon
- Canton: L'Arbresle
- Intercommunality: Monts du Lyonnais

Government
  - Mayor (2020–2026): Pascal Fichet
- Area^{1}: 12.25 km^{2} (4.73 sq mi)
- Elevation: 650 m (2,130 ft)
- Highest elevation: 817 m (2,680 ft)
- Lowest elevation: 380 m (1,250 ft)
- Population (2023): 821
  - Density: 67.0/km^{2} (174/sq mi)
- Time zone: UTC+01:00 (CET)
  - Summer (DST): UTC+02:00 (CEST)
- INSEE/Postal code: 69030 /69690
- ^{1} French Land Register data, which excludes lakes, ponds, glaciers > 1 km^{2} (0.386 sq mi or 247 acres) and river estuaries.

Brullioles (French pronunciation: [bʁyljɔl]) is a commune in the Rhône department in eastern France.

== See also ==
Communes of the Rhône department
