= Souzy =

- Commune
- Location of Souzy
- Location within France Location within Auvergne-Rhône-Alpes
- Coordinates: 45°42′23″N 4°26′57″E
- Country: France
- Region: Auvergne-Rhône-Alpes
- Department: Rhône
- Arrondissement: Lyon
- Canton: L'Arbresle
- Intercommunality: Monts du Lyonnais

Government
  - Mayor (2020–2026): Guy Saulnier
- Area^{1}: 5.09 km^{2} (1.97 sq mi)
- Elevation: 525 m (1,722 ft)
- Highest elevation: 619 m (2,031 ft)
- Lowest elevation: 422 m (1,385 ft)
- Population (2023): 763
  - Density: 150/km^{2} (388/sq mi)
- Time zone: UTC+01:00 (CET)
  - Summer (DST): UTC+02:00 (CEST)
- INSEE/Postal code: 69178 /69610
- ^{1} French Land Register data, which excludes lakes, ponds, glaciers > 1 km^{2} (0.386 sq mi or 247 acres) and river estuaries.

Souzy (French pronunciation: [suzi]) is a commune in the Rhône department in eastern France.

== See also ==
- Communes of the Rhône department
