= Montrottier =

- Commune
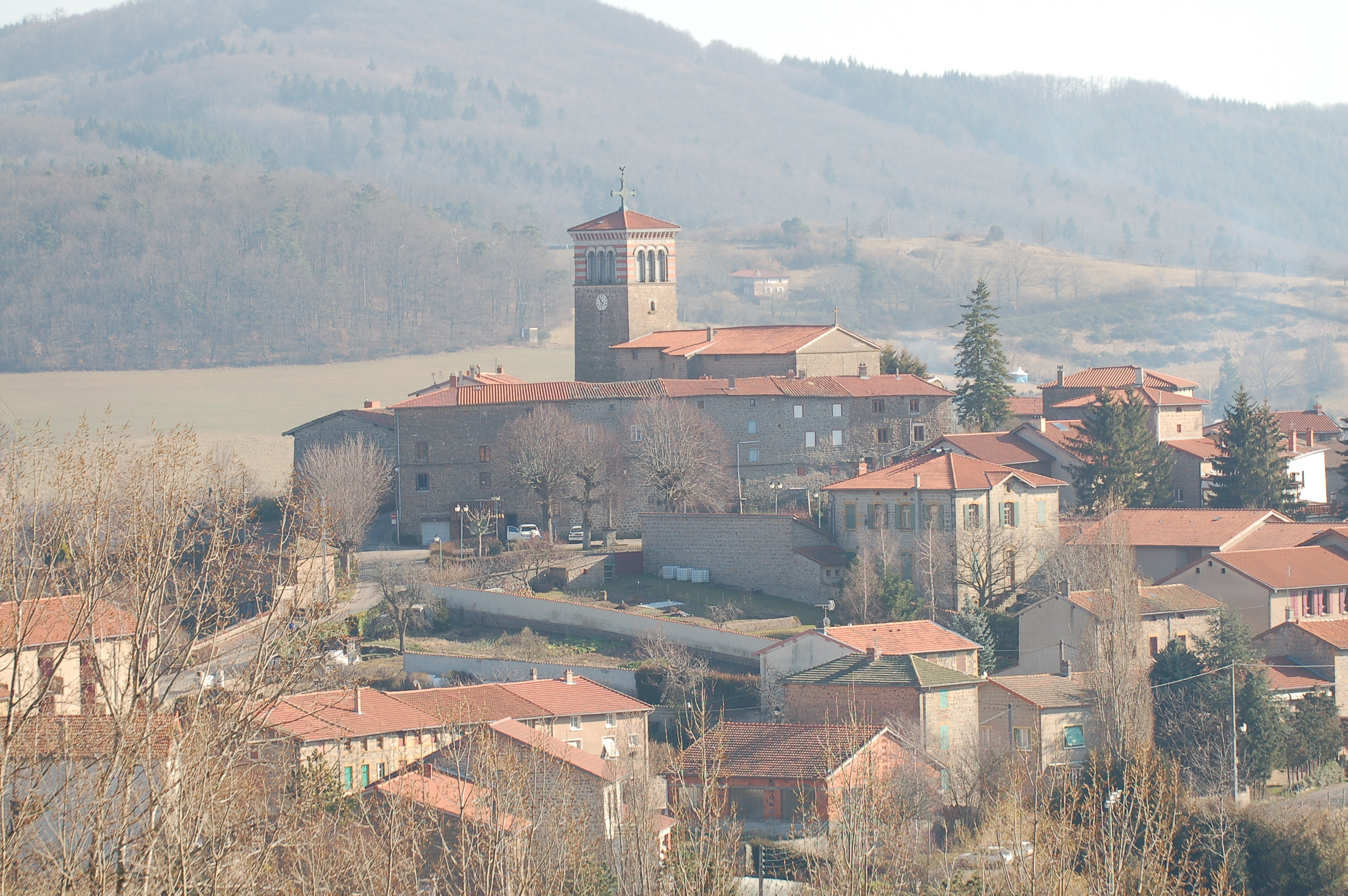
- The church and surrounding buildings in Montrottier

- Coat of arms
- Location of Montrottier
- Location within France Location within Auvergne-Rhône-Alpes
- Coordinates: 45°47′27″N 4°28′03″E
- Country: France
- Region: Auvergne-Rhône-Alpes
- Department: Rhône
- Arrondissement: Lyon
- Canton: L'Arbresle
- Intercommunality: Monts du Lyonnais

Government
  - Mayor (2020–2026): Michel Gouget
- Area^{1}: 23.1 km^{2} (8.9 sq mi)
- Elevation: 680 m (2,230 ft)
- Highest elevation: 851 m (2,792 ft)
- Lowest elevation: 460 m (1,510 ft)
- Population (2023): 1,400
  - Density: 61/km^{2} (160/sq mi)
- Time zone: UTC+01:00 (CET)
  - Summer (DST): UTC+02:00 (CEST)
- INSEE/Postal code: 69139 /69770
- ^{1} French Land Register data, which excludes lakes, ponds, glaciers > 1 km^{2} (0.386 sq mi or 247 acres) and river estuaries.

Montrottier (French pronunciation: [mɔ̃tʁɔtje]) is a commune in the Rhône department in eastern France.

== See also ==
- Communes of the Rhône department
