= Fleurieux-sur-l'Arbresle =

- Commune
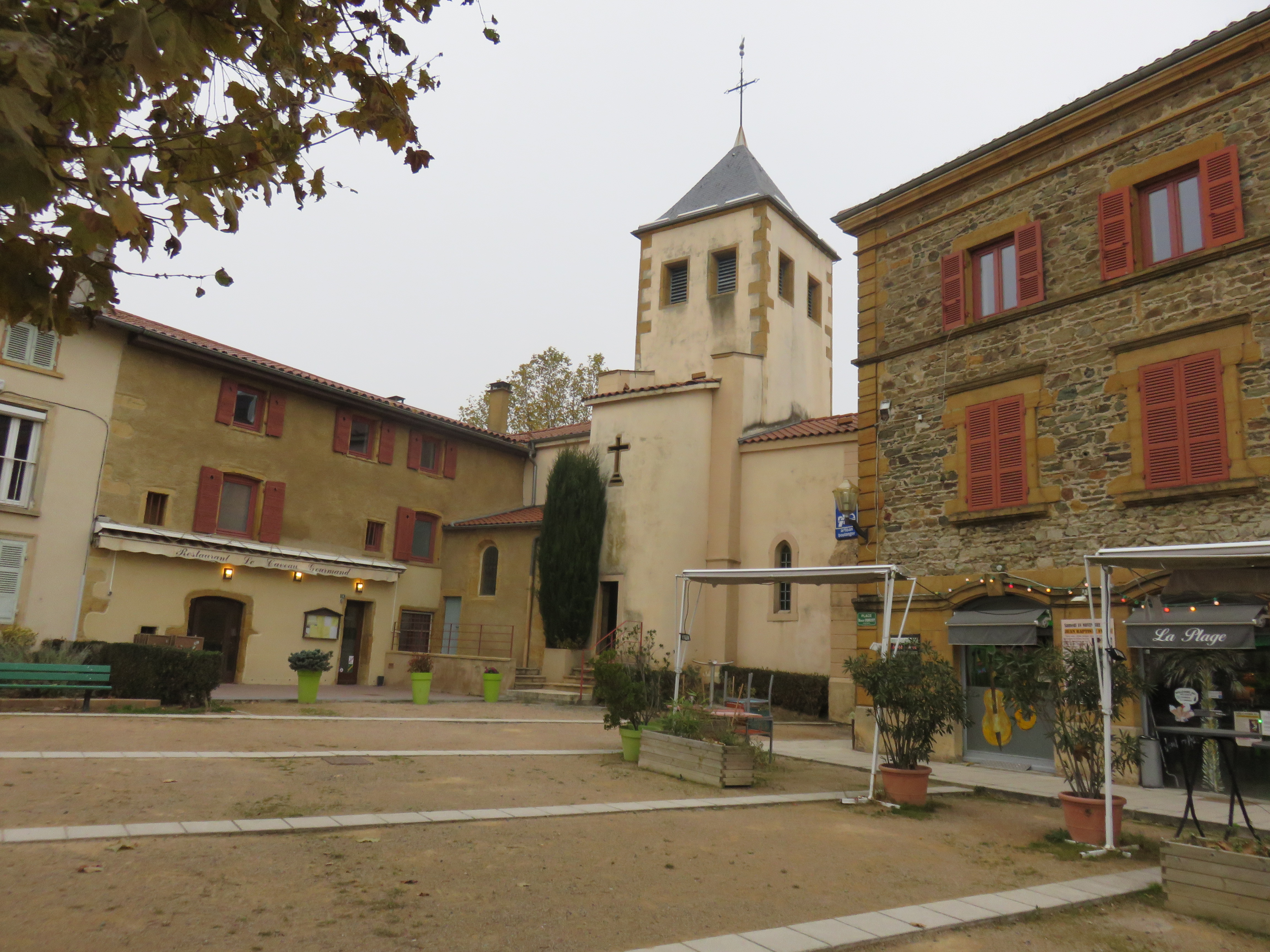
- Square and Saint Bartholomew church in 2017.

- Coat of arms
- Location of Fleurieux-sur-l'Arbresle
- Location within France Location within Auvergne-Rhône-Alpes
- Coordinates: 45°50′13″N 4°39′12″E
- Country: France
- Region: Auvergne-Rhône-Alpes
- Department: Rhône
- Arrondissement: Villefranche-sur-Saône
- Canton: L'Arbresle
- Intercommunality: Pays de L'Arbresle

Government
  - Mayor (2020–2026): Diogène Batalla
- Area^{1}: 9.51 km^{2} (3.67 sq mi)
- Elevation: 400 m (1,300 ft)
- Highest elevation: 403 m (1,322 ft)
- Lowest elevation: 200 m (660 ft)
- Population (2023): 2,361
  - Density: 248/km^{2} (643/sq mi)
- Time zone: UTC+01:00 (CET)
  - Summer (DST): UTC+02:00 (CEST)
- INSEE/Postal code: 69086 /69210
- ^{1} French Land Register data, which excludes lakes, ponds, glaciers > 1 km^{2} (0.386 sq mi or 247 acres) and river estuaries.

Fleurieux-sur-l'Arbresle is a commune in the Rhône department in eastern France.

== Population ==
Historical population
Year	Pop.	±% p.a.
1968	802	—
1975	918	+1.95%
1982	1,496	+7.23%
1990	1,840	+2.62%
1999	2,025	+1.07%
2007	2,111	+0.52%
2012	2,336	+2.05%
2017	2,334	−0.02%
2023	2,361	+0.19%
Source: INSEE

== See also ==
- Communes of the Rhône department
