= Saint-Julien-sur-Bibost =

- Commune
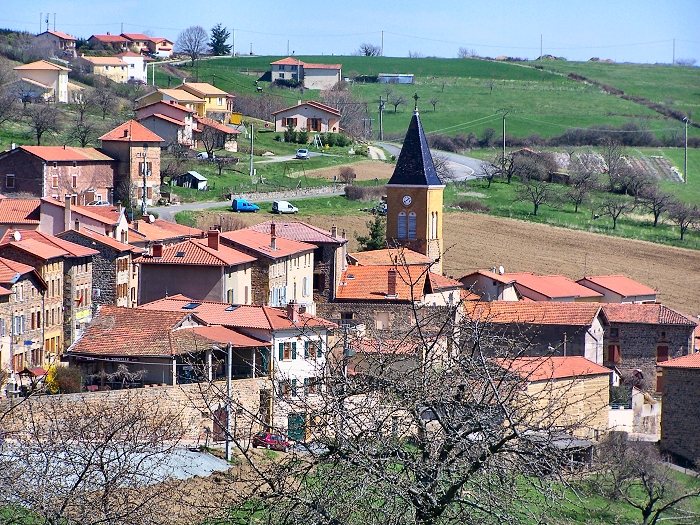
- Location of Saint-Julien-sur-Bibost
- Location within France Location within Auvergne-Rhône-Alpes
- Coordinates: 45°48′18″N 4°31′11″E
- Country: France
- Region: Auvergne-Rhône-Alpes
- Department: Rhône
- Arrondissement: Villefranche-sur-Saône
- Canton: L'Arbresle

Government
  - Mayor (2020–2026): Florent Chirat
- Area^{1}: 13.28 km^{2} (5.13 sq mi)
- Elevation: 507 m (1,663 ft)
- Highest elevation: 860 m (2,820 ft)
- Lowest elevation: 380 m (1,250 ft)
- Population (2023): 622
  - Density: 46.8/km^{2} (121/sq mi)
- Time zone: UTC+01:00 (CET)
  - Summer (DST): UTC+02:00 (CEST)
- INSEE/Postal code: 69216 /69690
- ^{1} French Land Register data, which excludes lakes, ponds, glaciers > 1 km^{2} (0.386 sq mi or 247 acres) and river estuaries.

Saint-Julien-sur-Bibost is a commune in the Rhône department in eastern France.

== See also ==
- Communes of the Rhône department
