= Bessenay =

- Commune
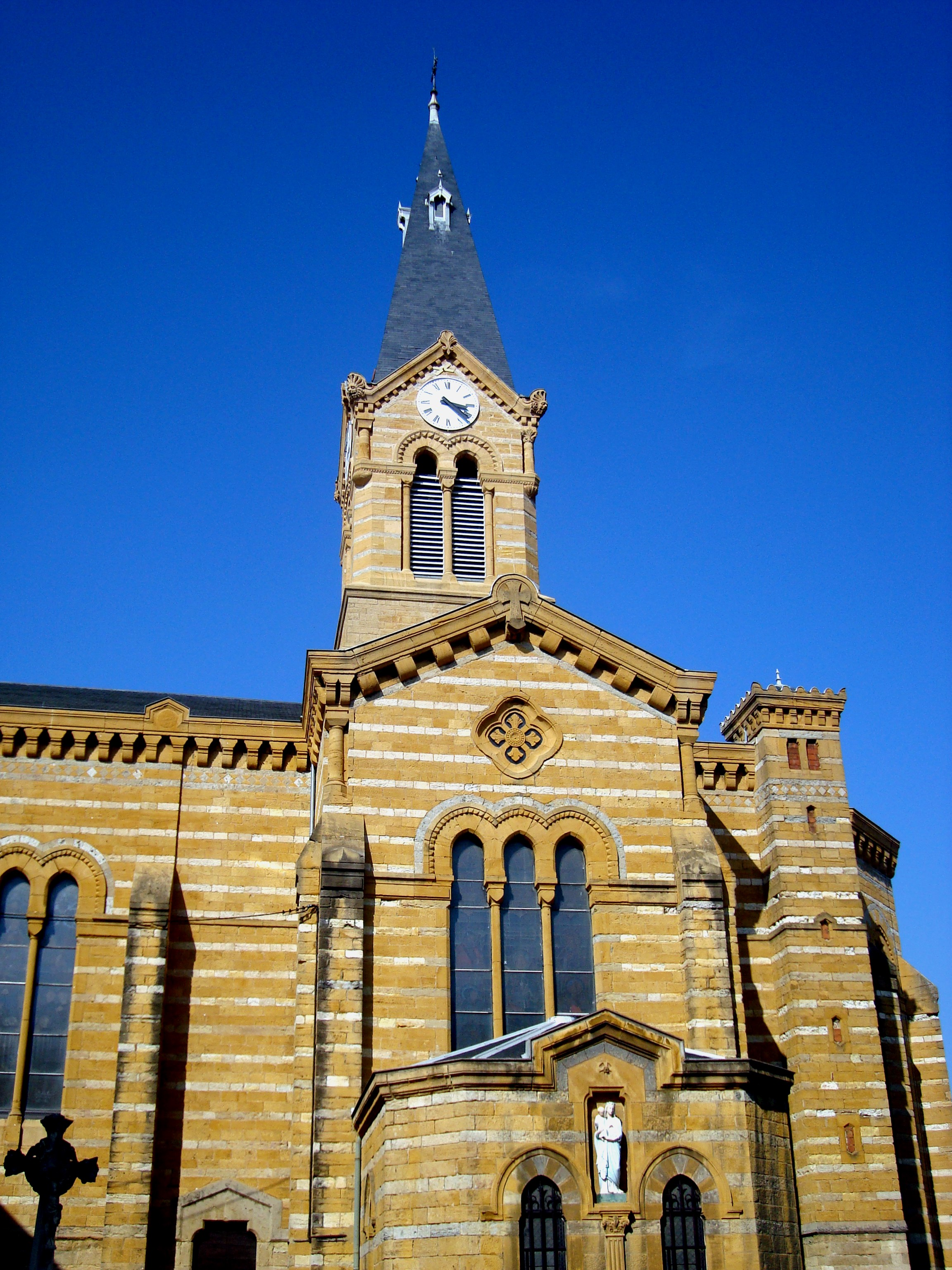
- The church of Saint-Irénée

- Coat of arms
- Location of Bessenay
- Location within France Location within Auvergne-Rhône-Alpes
- Coordinates: 45°46′39″N 4°33′19″E
- Country: France
- Region: Auvergne-Rhône-Alpes
- Department: Rhône
- Arrondissement: Villefranche-sur-Saône
- Canton: L'Arbresle
- Intercommunality: Pays de l'Arbresle

Government
  - Mayor (2020–2026): Karine Forest
- Area^{1}: 14.01 km^{2} (5.41 sq mi)
- Elevation: 412 m (1,352 ft)
- Highest elevation: 664 m (2,178 ft)
- Lowest elevation: 254 m (833 ft)
- Population (2023): 2,331
  - Density: 166.4/km^{2} (430.9/sq mi)
- Time zone: UTC+01:00 (CET)
  - Summer (DST): UTC+02:00 (CEST)
- INSEE/Postal code: 69021 /69690
- ^{1} French Land Register data, which excludes lakes, ponds, glaciers > 1 km^{2} (0.386 sq mi or 247 acres) and river estuaries.

Bessenay (French pronunciation: [bɛsnɛ]) is a commune of the Rhône department in eastern France.

== Population ==
Historical population
Year	Pop.	±% p.a.
1968	1,252	—
1975	1,303	+0.57%
1982	1,572	+2.72%
1990	1,611	+0.31%
1999	1,830	+1.43%
2007	2,180	+2.21%
2012	2,249	+0.63%
2017	2,293	+0.39%
2023	2,331	+0.27%
Source: INSEE

== See also ==
Communes of the Rhône department
