= Communes of the Rhône department =

The following is a list of the 208 communes of the Rhône department of France. This list does not includes the Lyon Metropolis which has 59 communes. For communes in the Lyon Metropolis, see Communes of the Lyon Metropolis.

The communes cooperate in the following intercommunalities (as of 2025):

- Communauté d'agglomération de l'Ouest Rhodanien
- Communauté d'agglomération Vienne Condrieu (partly)
- Communauté d'agglomération Villefranche Beaujolais Saône (partly)
- Communauté de communes Beaujolais Pierres Dorées
- Communauté de communes de l'Est lyonnais
- Communauté de communes des Monts du Lyonnais (partly)
- Communauté de communes du Pays de L'Arbresle
- Communauté de communes du Pays Mornantais
- Communauté de communes du Pays de l'Ozon
- Communauté de communes Saône Beaujolais
- Communauté de communes de la Vallée du Garon
- Communauté de communes des Vallons du Lyonnais

INSEE code	Postal code	Commune
69001	69170	Affoux
69002	69790	Aigueperse
69004	69380	Alix
69005	69480	Ambérieux
69006	69550	Amplepuis
69007	69420	Ampuis
69008	69490	Ancy
69009	69480	Anse
69010	69210	L'Arbresle
69012	69430	Les Ardillats
69013	69400	Arnas
69014	69610	Aveize
69016	69790	Azolette
69017	69620	Bagnols
69018	69430	Beaujeu
69179	69700	Beauvallon
69019	69220	Belleville-en-Beaujolais
69020	69380	Belmont-d'Azergues
69021	69690	Bessenay
69022	69690	Bibost
69023	69460	Blacé
69026	69620	Le Breuil
69027	69530	Brignais
69028	69126	Brindas
69030	69690	Brullioles
69031	69690	Brussieu
69032	69210	Bully
69035	69840	Cenves
69036	69220	Cercié
69228	69440	Chabanière
69037	69870	Chambost-Allières
69038	69770	Chambost-Longessaigne
69039	69620	Chamelet
69042	69590	La Chapelle-sur-Coise
69270	69970	Chaponnay
69043	69630	Chaponost
69045	69220	Charentay
69047	69380	Charnay
69049	69380	Chasselay
69050	69380	Châtillon
69051	69440	Chaussan
69052	69380	Chazay-d'Azergues
69053	69840	Chénas
69054	69430	Chénelette
69055	69380	Les Chères
69056	69380	Chessy
69057	69210	Chevinay
69058	69115	Chiroubles
69059	69380	Civrieux-d'Azergues
69060	69870	Claveisolles
69061	69640	Cogny
69062	69590	Coise
69299	69124	Colombier-Saugnieu
69272	69360	Communay
69064	69420	Condrieu
69065	69220	Corcelles-en-Beaujolais
69066	69470	Cours
69067	69690	Courzieu
69070	69550	Cublize
69074	69640	Denicé
69135	69860	Deux-Grosnes
69075	69170	Dième
69076	69380	Dommartin
69077	69220	Dracé
69078	69850	Duerne
69080	69700	Échalas
69082	69840	Émeringes
69083	69210	Éveux
69084	69820	Fleurie
69086	69210	Fleurieux-sur-l'Arbresle
69090	69620	Frontenas
69277	69740	Genas
69092	69400	Gleizé
69093	69870	Grandris
69094	69290	Grézieu-la-Varenne
69095	69610	Grézieu-le-Marché
69097	69420	Les Haies
69098	69610	Les Halles
69099	69610	Haute-Rivoire
69280	69330	Jons
69102	69170	Joux
69103	69840	Juliénas
69104	69840	Jullié
69105	69640	Lacenas
69106	69480	Lachassagne
69107	69870	Lamure-sur-Azergues
69108	69220	Lancié
69109	69430	Lantignié
69110	69590	Larajasse
69111	69620	Légny
69112	69210	Lentilly
69113	69620	Létra
69115	69400	Limas
69118	69700	Loire-sur-Rhône
69119	69420	Longes
69120	69770	Longessaigne
69121	69380	Lozanne
69122	69480	Lucenay
69124	69430	Marchampt
69125	69380	Marcilly-d'Azergues
69126	69480	Marcy
69281	69970	Marennes
69130	69550	Meaux-la-Montagne
69131	69510	Messimy
69132	69610	Meys
69133	69390	Millery
69134	69620	Moiré
69136	69700	Montagny
69137	69640	Montmelas-Saint-Sorlin
69138	69610	Montromant
69139	69770	Montrottier
69140	69480	Morancé

INSEE code	Postal code	Commune
69141	69440	Mornant
69145	69460	Odenas
69148	69530	Orliénas
69151	69460	Le Perréon
69154	69290	Pollionnay
69155	69590	Pomeys
69156	69480	Pommiers
69159	69400	Porte des Pierres Dorées
69160	69870	Poule-les-Écharmeaux
69161	69790	Propières
69285	69330	Pusignan
69162	69430	Quincié-en-Beaujolais
69164	69470	Ranchal
69165	69430	Régnié-Durette
69166	69440	Riverie
69167	69640	Rivolet
69169	69550	Ronno
69170	69510	Rontalon
69171	69210	Sain-Bel
69180	69440	Saint-André-la-Côte
69181	69170	Saint-Appolinaire
69287	69720	Saint-Bonnet-de-Mure
69182	69790	Saint-Bonnet-des-Bruyères
69183	69870	Saint-Bonnet-le-Troncy
69186	69790	Saint-Clément-de-Vers
69187	69930	Saint-Clément-les-Places
69188	69170	Saint-Clément-sur-Valsonne
69192	69870	Saint-Cyr-le-Chatoux
69193	69560	Saint-Cyr-sur-le-Rhône
69196	69430	Saint-Didier-sur-Beaujeu
69184	69440	Sainte-Catherine
69189	69560	Sainte-Colombe
69190	69280	Sainte-Consorce
69201	69610	Sainte-Foy-l'Argentière
69230	69620	Sainte-Paule
69197	69460	Saint-Étienne-des-Oullières
69198	69460	Saint-Étienne-la-Varenne
69200	69490	Saint-Forgeux
69203	69610	Saint-Genis-l'Argentière
69206	69830	Saint-Georges-de-Reneins
69208	69210	Saint-Germain-Nuelles
69209	69790	Saint-Igny-de-Vers
69212	69380	Saint-Jean-des-Vignes
69214	69550	Saint-Jean-la-Bussière
69215	69640	Saint-Julien
69216	69690	Saint-Julien-sur-Bibost
69217	69870	Saint-Just-d'Avray
69218	69220	Saint-Lager
69219	69440	Saint-Laurent-d'Agny
69220	69930	Saint-Laurent-de-Chamousset
69288	69720	Saint-Laurent-de-Mure
69225	69170	Saint-Marcel-l'Éclairé
69227	69850	Saint-Martin-en-Haut
69229	69870	Saint-Nizier-d'Azergues
69289	69780	Saint-Pierre-de-Chandieu
69231	69210	Saint-Pierre-la-Palud
69234	69490	Saint-Romain-de-Popey
69235	69560	Saint-Romain-en-Gal
69236	69700	Saint-Romain-en-Gier
69291	69360	Saint-Symphorien-d'Ozon
69238	69590	Saint-Symphorien-sur-Coise
69239	69620	Saint-Vérand
69240	69240	Saint-Vincent-de-Reins
69172	69460	Salles-Arbuissonnas-en-Beaujolais
69173	69490	Sarcey
69174	69170	Les Sauvages
69175	69210	Savigny
69294	69360	Sérézin-du-Rhône
69295	69360	Simandres
69176	69510	Soucieu-en-Jarrest
69177	69210	Sourcieux-les-Mines
69178	69610	Souzy
69241	69440	Taluyers
69242	69220	Taponas
69243	69170	Tarare
69245	69620	Ternand
69297	69360	Ternay
69246	69620	Theizé
69248	69240	Thizy-les-Bourgs
69249	69510	Thurins
69298	69780	Toussieu
69252	69420	Trèves
69253	69420	Tupin-et-Semons
69024	69620	Val d'Oingt
69254	69170	Valsonne
69255	69670	Vaugneray
69257	69460	Vaux-en-Beaujolais
69258	69820	Vauxrenard
69261	69430	Vernay
69263	69770	Villechenève
69264	69400	Villefranche-sur-Saône
69265	69640	Ville-sur-Jarnioux
69267	69910	Villié-Morgon
69157	69490	Vindry-sur-Turdine
69268	69390	Vourles
69269	69510	Yzeron
