= Saint-Genis-l'Argentière =

- Commune
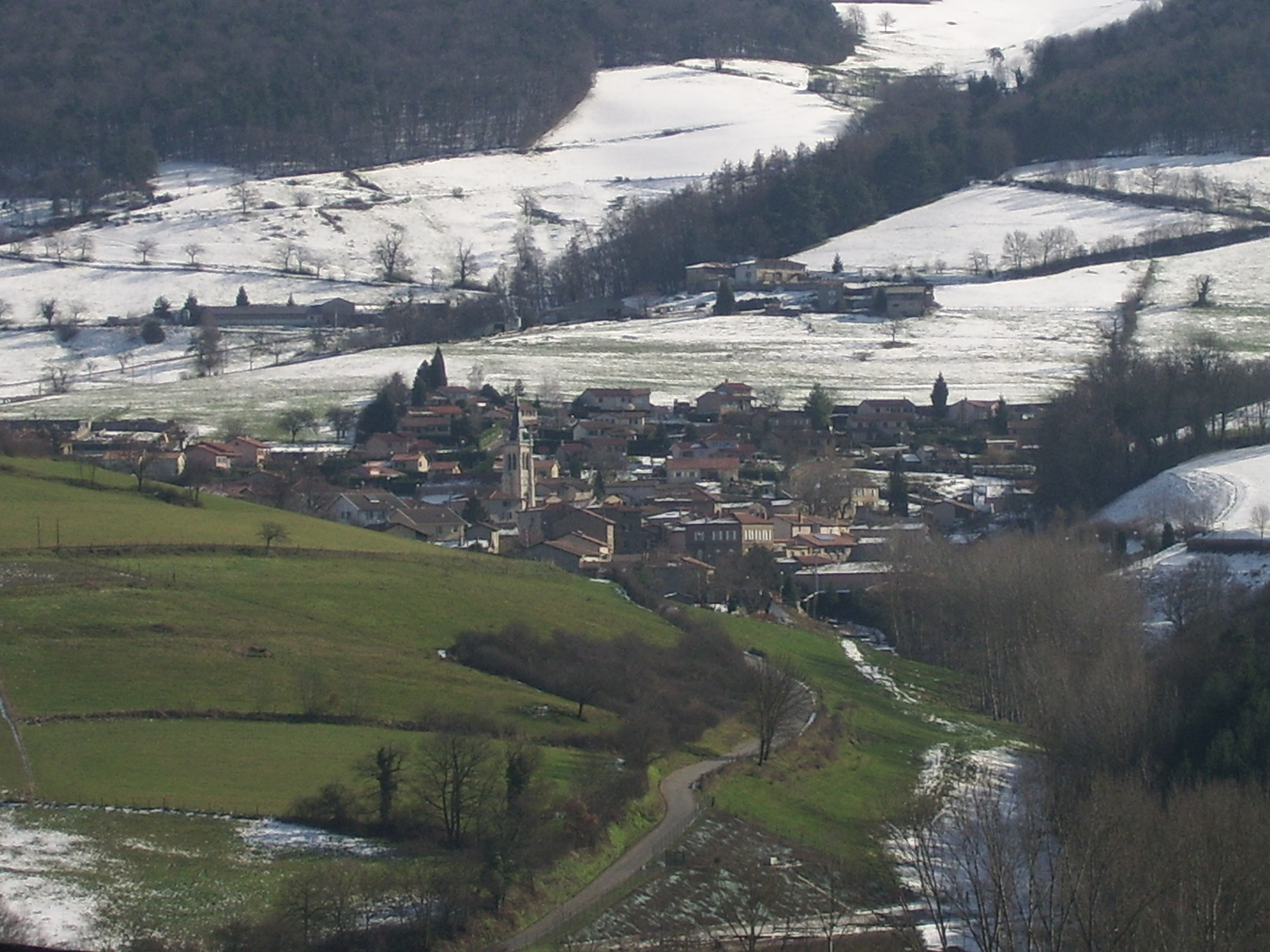
- A general view of Saint-Genis-l'Argentière

- Coat of arms
- Location of Saint-Genis-l'Argentière
- Location within France Location within Auvergne-Rhône-Alpes
- Coordinates: 45°42′39″N 4°29′34″E
- Country: France
- Region: Auvergne-Rhône-Alpes
- Department: Rhône
- Arrondissement: Lyon
- Canton: L'Arbresle
- Intercommunality: Monts du Lyonnais

Government
  - Mayor (2020–2026): Alexis Badoil
- Area^{1}: 10.65 km^{2} (4.11 sq mi)
- Elevation: 480 m (1,570 ft)
- Highest elevation: 860 m (2,820 ft)
- Lowest elevation: 330 m (1,080 ft)
- Population (2023): 986
  - Density: 92.6/km^{2} (240/sq mi)
- Time zone: UTC+01:00 (CET)
  - Summer (DST): UTC+02:00 (CEST)
- INSEE/Postal code: 69203 /69610
- ^{1} French Land Register data, which excludes lakes, ponds, glaciers > 1 km^{2} (0.386 sq mi or 247 acres) and river estuaries.

Saint-Genis-l'Argentière (French pronunciation: [sɛ̃ ʒəni laʁʒɑ̃tjɛʁ]) is a commune in the Rhône department in eastern France.

== See also ==
- Communes of the Rhône department
