= Sainte-Foy-l'Argentière =

- Commune
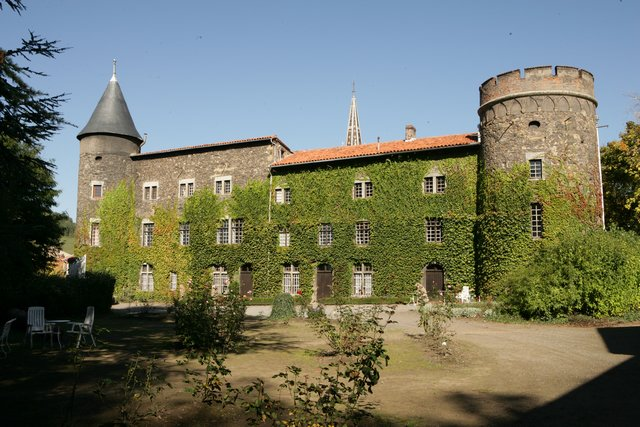
- The chateau in Sainte-Foy-l'Argentière
- Location of Sainte-Foy-l'Argentière
- Location within France Location within Auvergne-Rhône-Alpes
- Coordinates: 45°42′33″N 4°28′16″E
- Country: France
- Region: Auvergne-Rhône-Alpes
- Department: Rhône
- Arrondissement: Lyon
- Canton: L'Arbresle

Government
  - Mayor (2020–2026): Karine Berger
- Area^{1}: 1.54 km^{2} (0.59 sq mi)
- Elevation: 423 m (1,388 ft)
- Highest elevation: 480 m (1,570 ft)
- Lowest elevation: 417 m (1,368 ft)
- Population (2023): 1,312
  - Density: 852/km^{2} (2,210/sq mi)
- Time zone: UTC+01:00 (CET)
  - Summer (DST): UTC+02:00 (CEST)
- INSEE/Postal code: 69201 /69610
- ^{1} French Land Register data, which excludes lakes, ponds, glaciers > 1 km^{2} (0.386 sq mi or 247 acres) and river estuaries.

Sainte-Foy-l'Argentière (French pronunciation: [sɛ̃t fwa laʁʒɑ̃tjɛʁ]) is a commune in the Rhône department of France.

== Details ==
It is located about 42 km (26 mi) from Lyon.

The name means "Holy Faith, the silver-producer"; Sainte-Foy is equivalent to the common Spanish place-name Santa Fé, and the reference is to the silver mines around which the village grew.

The village is clustered around a kilometre-long main street ("la grande rue"), rising from the busy crossroads at the bottom to the high school (collège). In the main square, linked to the church, there is a central castle belonging to Family de Fenoyl, a riverside football club and stadium sometimes visited by Olympique Lyonnais in the pre-season, and a sports and entertainment centre (salle polyvalente). A popular antiques fair, which draws in crowds of thousands, is held every September, and there are other annual cultural activities.

The village's traditional and renowned main industry is roof tile manufacturing ("tuilerie").

== Popular mentions ==
The writer Bernard Clavel once lived near the village; it is also mentioned in a San-Antonio novel (author Frédéric Dard), and its tiny train station has been featured in various films.

== See also ==
- Communes of the Rhône department
