= La Bénisson-Dieu =

La Bénisson-Dieu La Benéçon-Diô (Arpitan)
- Commune
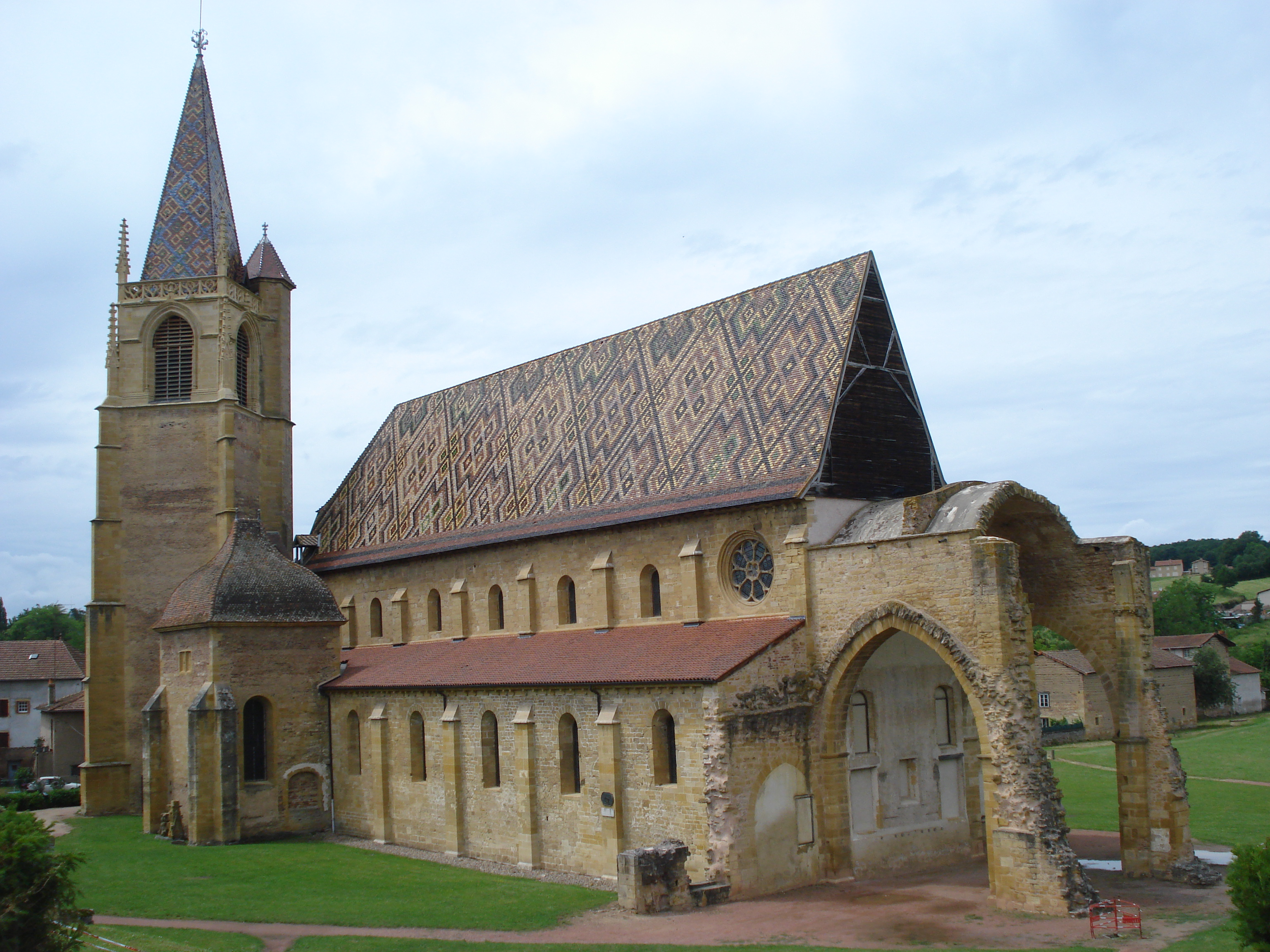
- Location of La Bénisson-Dieu
- Location within France Location within Auvergne-Rhône-Alpes
- Coordinates: 46°09′03″N 4°02′46″E
- Country: France
- Region: Auvergne-Rhône-Alpes
- Department: Loire
- Arrondissement: Roanne
- Canton: Charlieu
- Intercommunality: Charlieu-Belmont

Government
  - Mayor (2020–2026): Alain Godinot
- Area^{1}: 11.12 km^{2} (4.29 sq mi)
- Elevation: 268 m (879 ft)
- Highest elevation: 344 m (1,129 ft)
- Lowest elevation: 255 m (837 ft)
- Population (2023): 429
  - Density: 38.6/km^{2} (99.9/sq mi)
- Time zone: UTC+01:00 (CET)
  - Summer (DST): UTC+02:00 (CEST)
- INSEE/Postal code: 42016 /42720
- ^{1} French Land Register data, which excludes lakes, ponds, glaciers > 1 km^{2} (0.386 sq mi or 247 acres) and river estuaries.

La Bénisson-Dieu (French pronunciation: [la benisɔ̃ djø]; Arpitan: La Benéçon-Diô [la bə.ne.sɔ̃.ˈdʒø]) is a commune in the Loire department in central France.

== Population ==
Historical population
Year	Pop.	±% p.a.
1968	369	—
1975	364	−0.19%
1982	402	+1.43%
1990	391	−0.35%
1999	444	+1.42%
2007	444	+0.00%
2012	435	−0.41%
2017	418	−0.79%
2023	429	+0.43%
Source: INSEE

== See also ==
- Communes of the Loire department
