= J.-B. Martin's old weaving factory =

Coordinates: 45.8913°N 4.4421°E

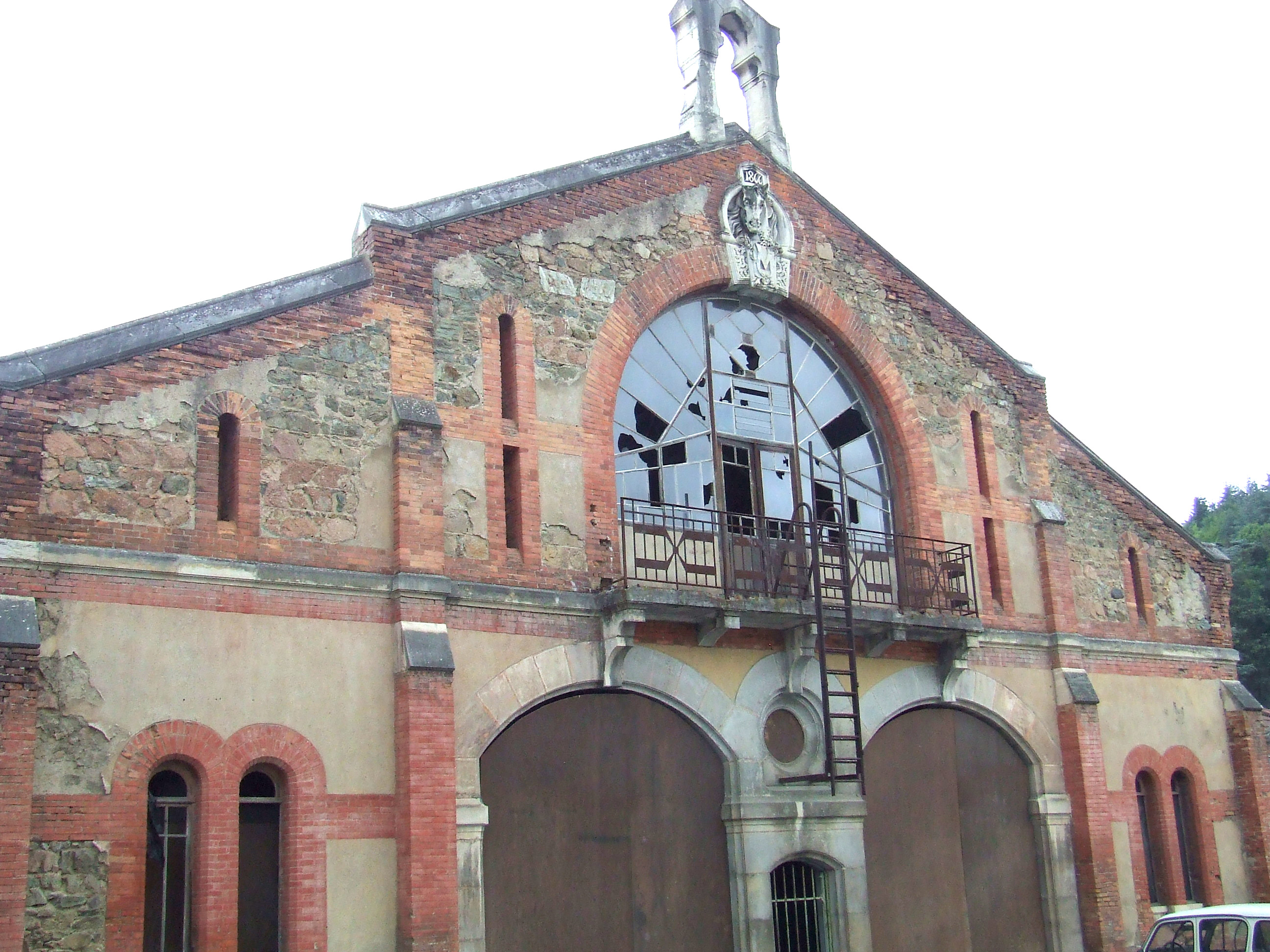
- Interactive map of the J.-B. Martin's old weaving factory area

General information
- Type: Factory
- Location: Tarare, France

Design and construction
- Architect: Eugène-Toussaint Cateland

J.-B. Martin's old weaving factory (French: "Ancienne manufacture de moulinage J-B. Martin") is a historic building in Tarare, Rhône, France. The silk-weaving company was founded in 1843, and the buildings, designed by architect Eugène-Toussaint Cateland, were completed in 1860. They were abandoned in 1939, in the midst of World War II. It has been listed as an official historical monument since October 29, 1987.
