= Saint-Loup =

Saint Loup or Saint-Loup may refer to:

- Lupus of Troyes (c. 383–c. 478), early bishop of Troyes
- Lupus of Sens (c. 573-c. 623), bishop of Sens
- Lupus, an early bishop of Bayeux
- Loup de Limoges, locally venerated in Limoges
- Loup de Soissons, locally venerated in Soissons
- Loup de Châlons-en-Champagne, locally venerated in Châlons-en-Champagne
- Marc Augier (1908–1990), French writer and politician who used the pseudonym Saint-Loup
- Robert de Saint-Loup, character in Marcel Proust's In Search of Lost Time

== Places ==
=== France ===
- Saint-Loup, Allier, in the Allier department
- Saint-Loup, Charente-Maritime, in the Charente-Maritime department
- Saint-Loup, Creuse, in the Creuse department
- Saint-Loup, Jura, in the Jura department
- Saint-Loup, Loir-et-Cher, in the Loir-et-Cher department
- Saint-Loup, Manche, in the Manche department
- Saint-Loup, Marne, in the Marne department
- Saint-Loup, Marseille, a neighbourhood of the 10th arrondissement of Marseille
- Saint-Loup, Rhône, in the Rhône department
- Saint-Loup, Tarn-et-Garonne, in the Tarn-et-Garonne department
- Saint-Loup-Cammas, in the Haute-Garonne department
- Saint-Loup-de-Buffigny, in the Aube department
- Saint-Loup-de-Fribois, in the Calvados department
- Saint-Loup-de-Gonois, in the Loiret department
- Saint-Loup-de-Naud, in the Seine-et-Marne department
- Saint-Loup-des-Bois, formerly Saint-Loup, in the Nièvre department
- Saint-Loup-des-Chaumes, in the Cher department
- Saint-Loup-des-Vignes, in the Loiret department
- Saint-Loup-de-Varennes, in the Saône-et-Loire department
- Saint-Loup-d'Ordon, in the Yonne department
- Saint-Loup-du-Dorat, in the Mayenne department
- Saint-Loup-du-Gast, in the Mayenne department
- Saint-Loup-en-Champagne, in the Ardennes department
- Saint-Loup-en-Comminges, in the Haute-Garonne department
- Saint-Loup-Géanges, in the Saône-et-Loire department
- Saint-Loup-Hors, in the Calvados department
- Saint-Loup-Lamairé, in the Deux-Sèvres department
- Saint-Loup-Nantouard, in the Haute-Saône department
- Saint-Loup-sur-Aujon, in the Haute-Marne department
- Saint-Loup-sur-Semouse, in the Haute-Saône department
- Saint-Loup-Terrier, in the Ardennes department

=== Switzerland ===
- Saint-Loup, Pompaples, a hamlet in the municipality of Pompaples

== Other uses ==
- Pic Saint-Loup, a mountain in the Languedoc-Roussillon region, France
- Abbey of Saint Loup, Troyes, a ninth century abbey near Troyes, France
