= Pontcharra-sur-Turdine =

- Part of Vindry-sur-Turdine
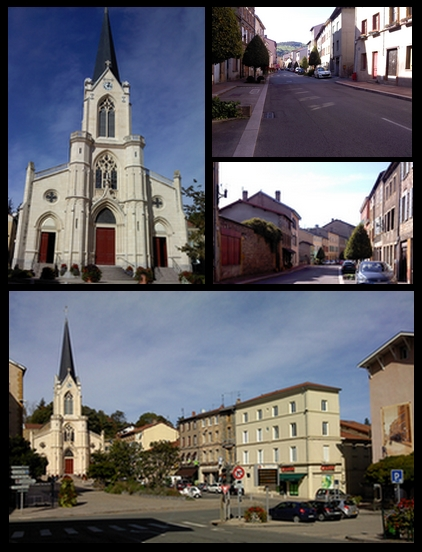
- Views of Pontcharra-sur-Turdine, including the church

- Coat of arms
- Location of Pontcharra-sur-Turdine
- Location within France Location within Auvergne-Rhône-Alpes
- Coordinates: 45°52′30″N 4°29′26″E
- Country: France
- Region: Auvergne-Rhône-Alpes
- Department: Rhône
- Arrondissement: Villefranche-sur-Saône
- Canton: Tarare
- Commune: Vindry-sur-Turdine
- Area^{1}: 4.73 km^{2} (1.83 sq mi)
- Elevation: 353 m (1,158 ft)
- Highest elevation: 558 m (1,831 ft)
- Lowest elevation: 315 m (1,033 ft)
- Population (2022): 2,739
  - Density: 579/km^{2} (1,500/sq mi)
- Time zone: UTC+01:00 (CET)
  - Summer (DST): UTC+02:00 (CEST)
- Postal code: 69490
- ^{1} French Land Register data, which excludes lakes, ponds, glaciers > 1 km^{2} (0.386 sq mi or 247 acres) and river estuaries.

Pontcharra-sur-Turdine (French pronunciation: [pɔ̃ʃaʁa syʁ tyʁdin], lit. 'Pontcharra on Turdine') is a former commune in the Rhône department in eastern France. On 1 January 2019, it was merged into the new commune Vindry-sur-Turdine.

== See also ==
- Communes of the Rhône department
