= Saint-Clément-sur-Valsonne =

- Commune
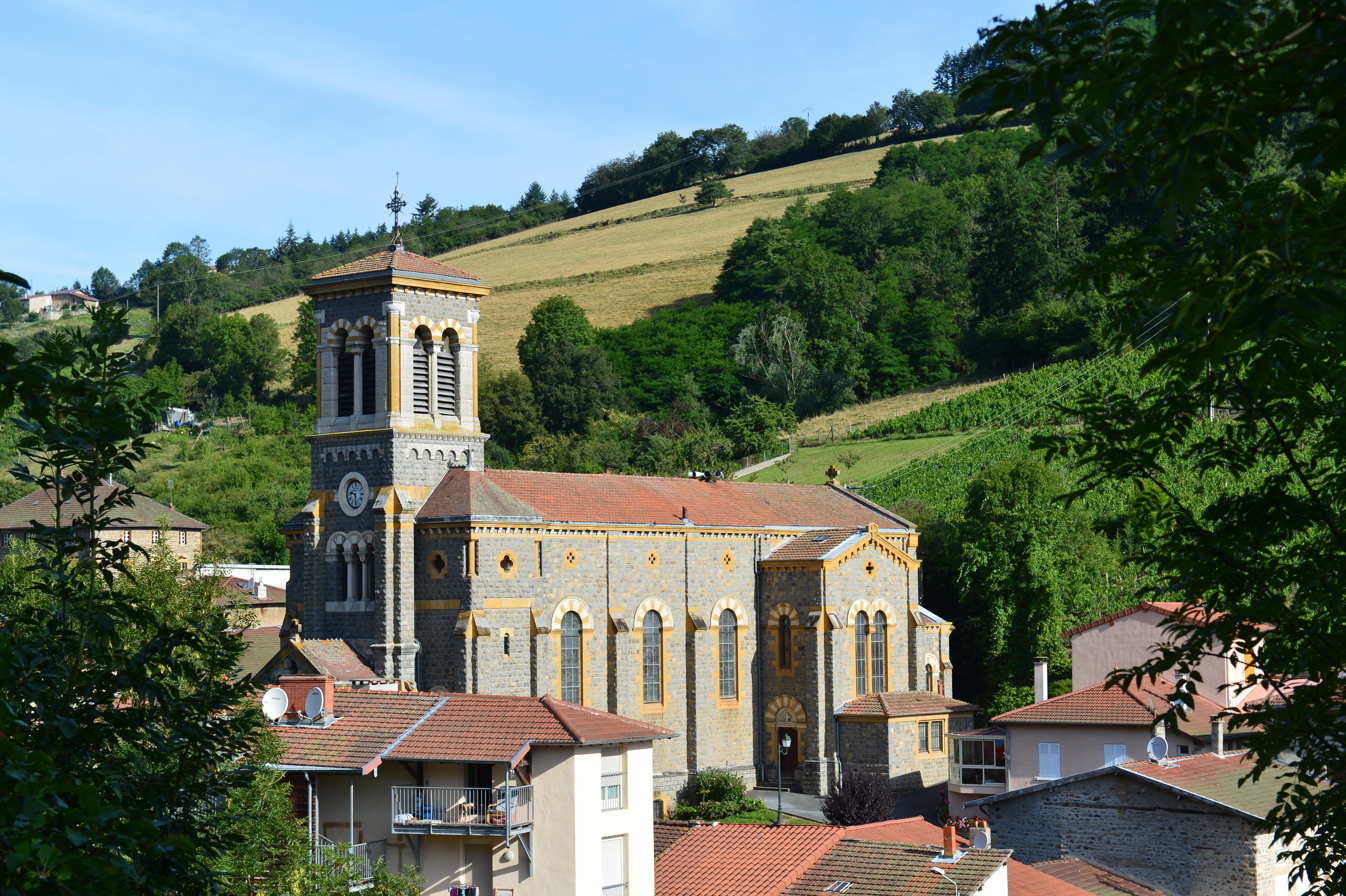
- The church in Saint-Clement-sur-Valsonne
- Location of Saint-Clément-sur-Valsonne
- Location within France Location within Auvergne-Rhône-Alpes
- Coordinates: 45°55′29″N 4°27′18″E
- Country: France
- Region: Auvergne-Rhône-Alpes
- Department: Rhône
- Arrondissement: Villefranche-sur-Saône
- Canton: Tarare
- Intercommunality: CA de l'Ouest Rhodanien

Government
  - Mayor (2020–2026): Sylvie Martinez
- Area^{1}: 14.51 km^{2} (5.60 sq mi)
- Elevation: 4,008 m (13,150 ft)
- Highest elevation: 710 m (2,330 ft)
- Lowest elevation: 319 m (1,047 ft)
- Population (2023): 900
  - Density: 62/km^{2} (160/sq mi)
- Time zone: UTC+01:00 (CET)
  - Summer (DST): UTC+02:00 (CEST)
- INSEE/Postal code: 69188 /69170
- ^{1} French Land Register data, which excludes lakes, ponds, glaciers > 1 km^{2} (0.386 sq mi or 247 acres) and river estuaries.

Saint-Clément-sur-Valsonne (French pronunciation: [sɛ̃ klemɑ̃ syʁ valsɔn], literally Saint-Clément on Valsonne) is a commune in the Rhône department in eastern France.

== See also ==
- Communes of the Rhône department
