= Les Olmes =

- Part of Vindry-sur-Turdine
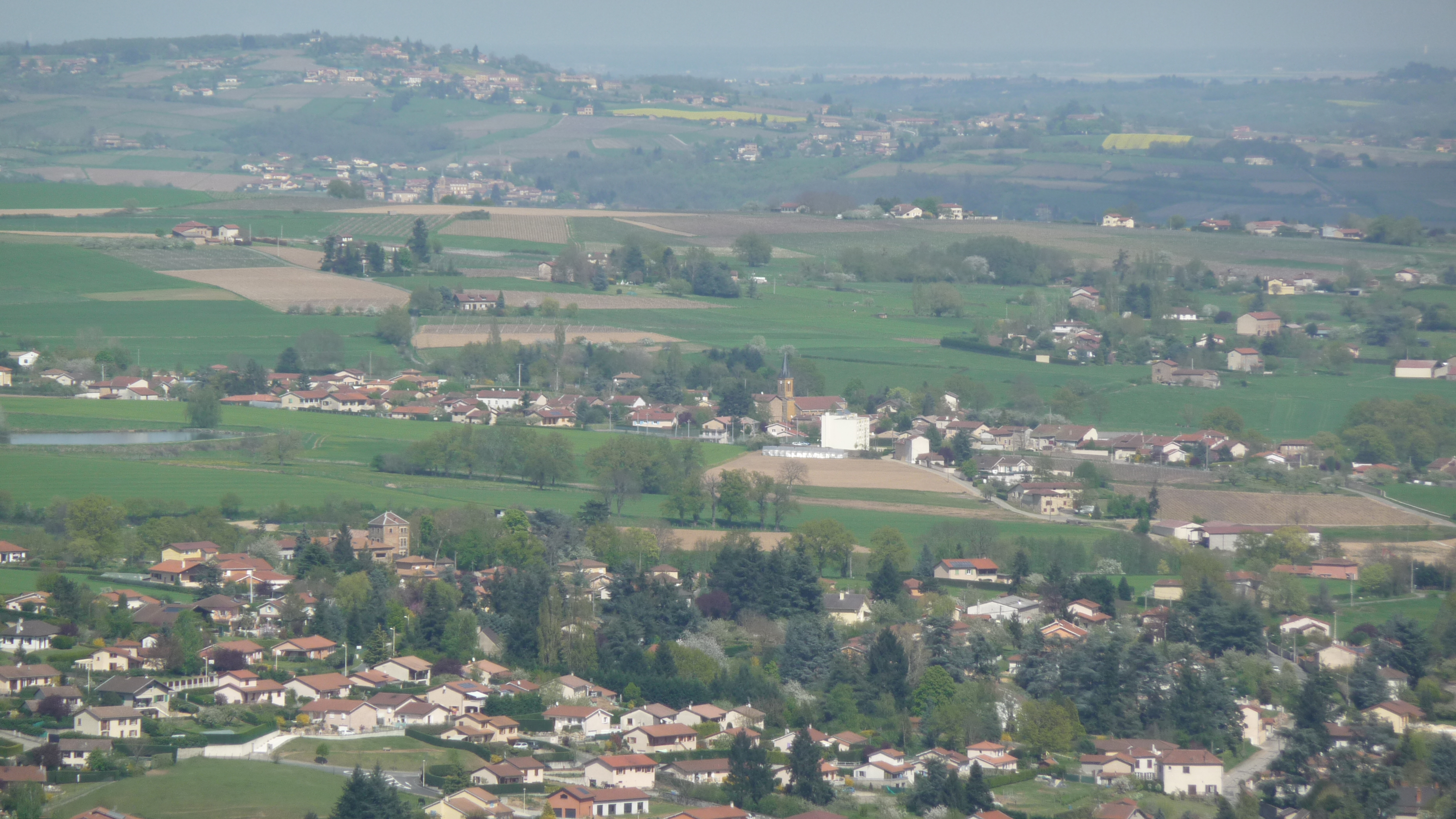
- A general view of Les Olmes
- Location of Les Olmes
- Location within France Location within Auvergne-Rhône-Alpes
- Coordinates: 45°53′02″N 4°31′02″E
- Country: France
- Region: Auvergne-Rhône-Alpes
- Department: Rhône
- Arrondissement: Villefranche-sur-Saône
- Canton: Tarare
- Commune: Vindry-sur-Turdine
- Area^{1}: 2.78 km^{2} (1.07 sq mi)
- Elevation: 351 m (1,152 ft)
- Highest elevation: 399 m (1,309 ft)
- Lowest elevation: 319 m (1,047 ft)
- Population (2022): 862
  - Density: 310/km^{2} (803/sq mi)
- Time zone: UTC+01:00 (CET)
  - Summer (DST): UTC+02:00 (CEST)
- Postal code: 69490
- ^{1} French Land Register data, which excludes lakes, ponds, glaciers > 1 km^{2} (0.386 sq mi or 247 acres) and river estuaries.

Les Olmes (French pronunciation: [le.z‿ɔlm]) is a former commune in the Rhône department in eastern France. On 1 January 2019, it was merged into the new commune Vindry-sur-Turdine.

== See also ==
- Communes of the Rhône department
