= Grandris =

- Commune
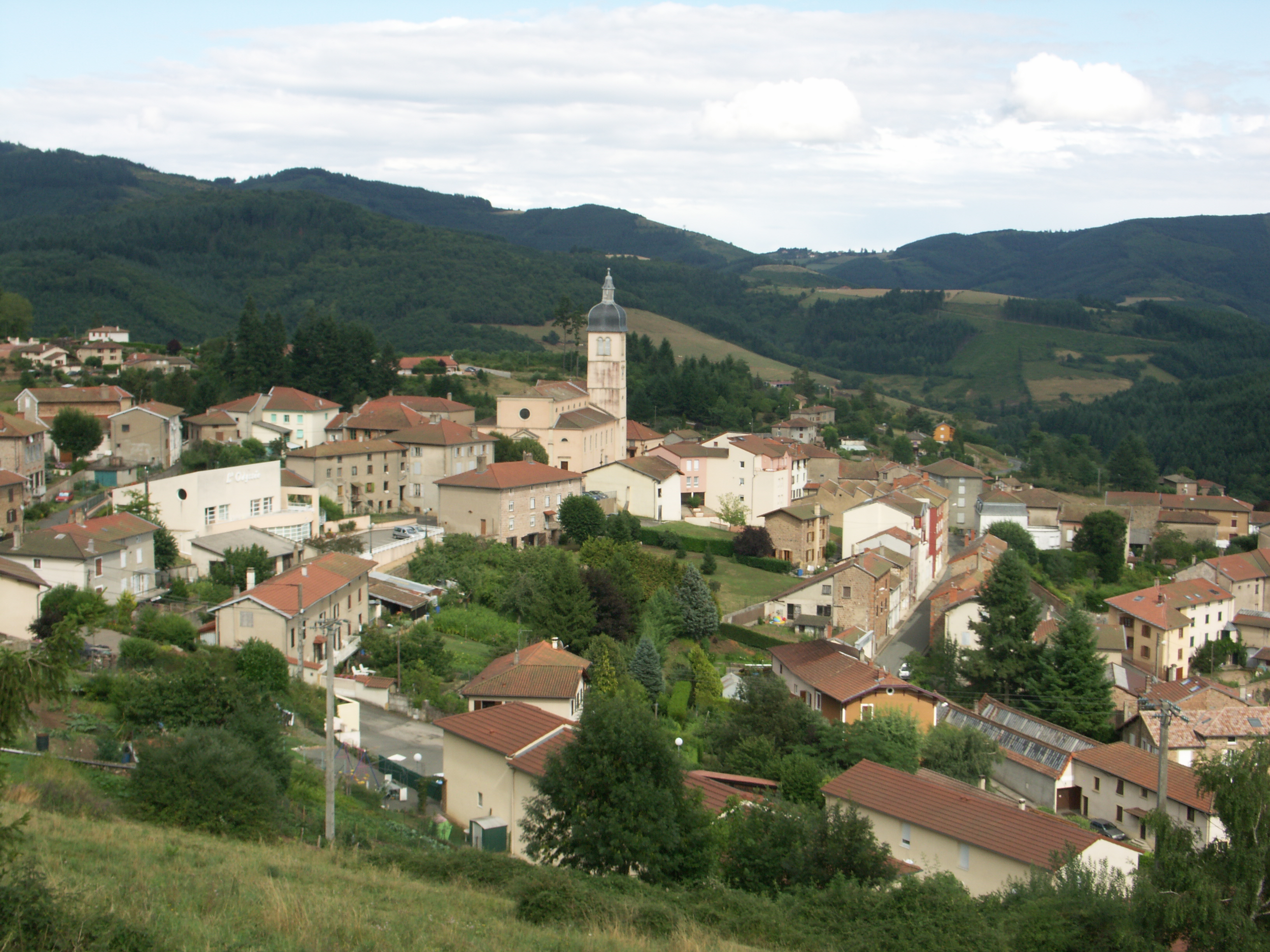
- The church and surrounding buildings in Grandris

- Coat of arms
- Location of Grandris
- Location within France Location within Auvergne-Rhône-Alpes
- Coordinates: 46°02′19″N 4°28′34″E
- Country: France
- Region: Auvergne-Rhône-Alpes
- Department: Rhône
- Arrondissement: Villefranche-sur-Saône
- Canton: Tarare
- Intercommunality: CA de l'Ouest Rhodanien

Government
  - Mayor (2020–2026): Pascale Jomard
- Area^{1}: 15.22 km^{2} (5.88 sq mi)
- Elevation: 450 m (1,480 ft)
- Highest elevation: 800 m (2,600 ft)
- Lowest elevation: 356 m (1,168 ft)
- Population (2023): 1,226
  - Density: 80.55/km^{2} (208.6/sq mi)
- Time zone: UTC+01:00 (CET)
  - Summer (DST): UTC+02:00 (CEST)
- INSEE/Postal code: 69093 /69870
- ^{1} French Land Register data, which excludes lakes, ponds, glaciers > 1 km^{2} (0.386 sq mi or 247 acres) and river estuaries.

Grandris (French pronunciation: [ɡʁɑ̃ʁi]) is a commune in the Rhône department in eastern France.

== See also ==
- Communes of the Rhône department
