= Communauté d'agglomération de l'Ouest Rhodanien =

Ouest Rhodanien
- Communauté d'agglomération
- Interactive map of Ouest Rhodanien
- Coordinates: 46°00′N 04°25′E
- Country: France
- Region: Auvergne-Rhône-Alpes
- Department: Rhône
- No. of communes: {{{nbcomm}}}
- Established: 2014
- Area: 578.6 km^{2} (223.4 sq mi)
- Population (2019): 50,601
  - Density: 87.45/km^{2} (226.5/sq mi)
- Website: www.ouestrhodanien.fr

Communauté d'agglomération de l'Ouest Rhodanien is the communauté d'agglomération, an intercommunal structure, centred on the town of Tarare. It is located in the Rhône department, in the Auvergne-Rhône-Alpes region, eastern France. Created in 2014, its seat is in Tarare. Its area is 578.6 km^{2}. Its population was 50,601 in 2019, of which 10,490 in Tarare proper.

== Composition ==
The communauté d'agglomération consists of the following 31 communes:

1. Affoux
2. Amplepuis
3. Ancy
4. Chambost-Allières
5. Chénelette
6. Claveisolles
7. Cours
8. Cublize
9. Dième
10. Grandris
11. Joux
12. Lamure-sur-Azergues
13. Meaux-la-Montagne
14. Poule-les-Écharmeaux
15. Ranchal
16. Ronno
17. Saint-Appolinaire
18. Saint-Bonnet-le-Troncy
19. Saint-Clément-sur-Valsonne
20. Saint-Forgeux
21. Saint-Jean-la-Bussière
22. Saint-Just-d'Avray
23. Saint-Marcel-l'Éclairé
24. Saint-Nizier-d'Azergues
25. Saint-Romain-de-Popey
26. Saint-Vincent-de-Reins
27. Les Sauvages
28. Tarare
29. Thizy-les-Bourgs
30. Valsonne
31. Vindry-sur-Turdine
