= Chambost-Allières =

- Commune
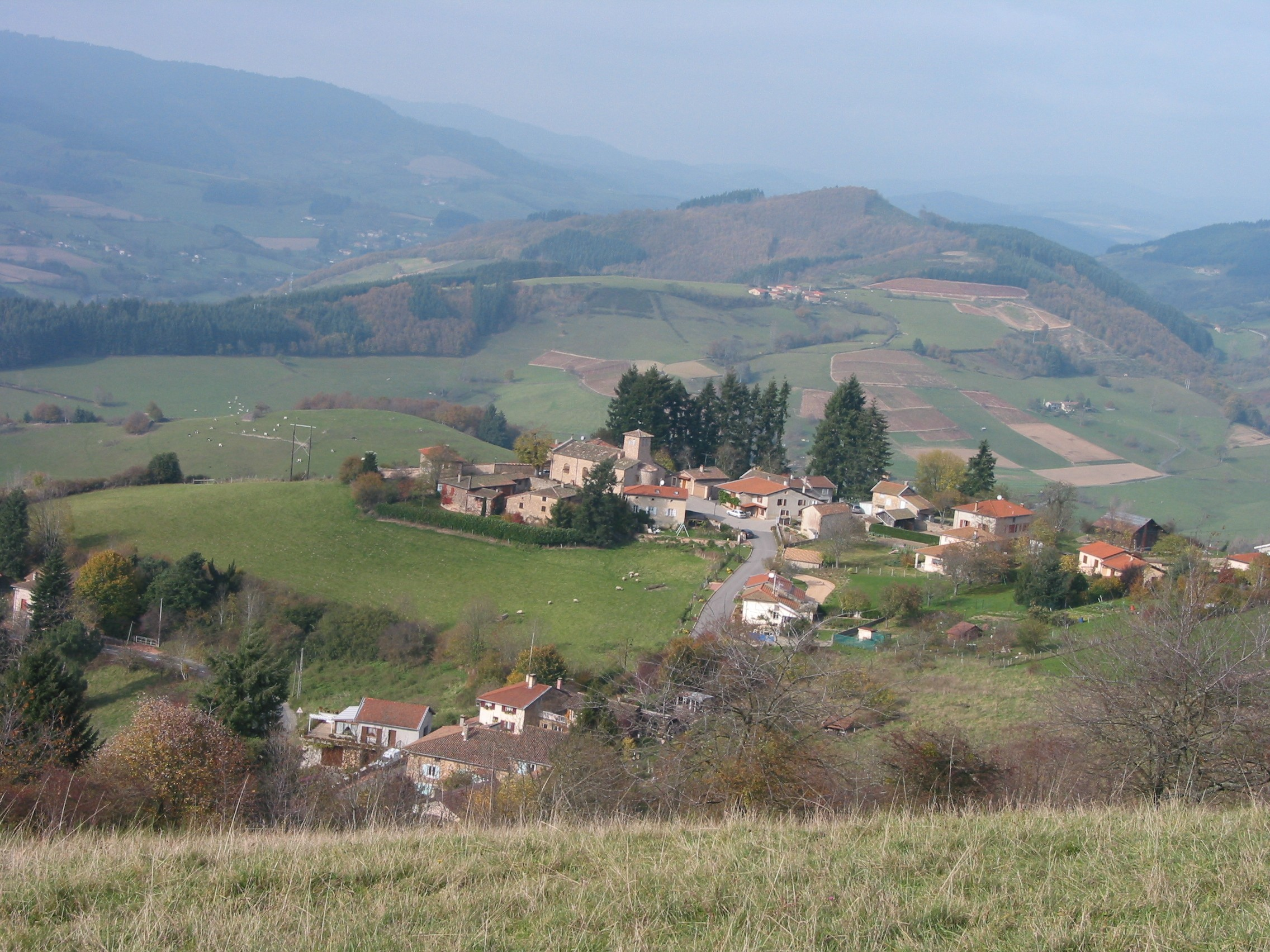
- A general view of Chambost-Allières
- Location of Chambost-Allières
- Location within France Location within Auvergne-Rhône-Alpes
- Coordinates: 46°01′09″N 4°29′57″E
- Country: France
- Region: Auvergne-Rhône-Alpes
- Department: Rhône
- Arrondissement: Villefranche-sur-Saône
- Canton: Tarare
- Intercommunality: CA de l'Ouest Rhodanien

Government
  - Mayor (2020–2026): Vincent Corgier
- Area^{1}: 14.14 km^{2} (5.46 sq mi)
- Elevation: 320 m (1,050 ft)
- Highest elevation: 865 m (2,838 ft)
- Lowest elevation: 320 m (1,050 ft)
- Population (2023): 816
  - Density: 57.7/km^{2} (149/sq mi)
- Time zone: UTC+01:00 (CET)
  - Summer (DST): UTC+02:00 (CEST)
- INSEE/Postal code: 69037 /69870
- ^{1} French Land Register data, which excludes lakes, ponds, glaciers > 1 km^{2} (0.386 sq mi or 247 acres) and river estuaries.

Chambost-Allières (French pronunciation: [ʃɑ̃bo aljɛʁ]) is a commune in the Rhône department in eastern France.

== Demography ==
Historical population
Year	Pop.	±% p.a.
1968	606	—
1975	658	+1.18%
1982	658	+0.00%
1990	618	−0.78%
1999	617	−0.02%
2007	770	+2.81%
2012	782	+0.31%
2017	839	+1.42%
2023	816	−0.46%
Source: INSEE

== See also ==
Communes of the Rhône department
