= Roger-Arnould Rivière =

French poet

Roger-Arnould Rivière (21 March 1930 – 16 September 1959) was a French poet.

Rivière was born in Tarare, Rhône. Despite not being unpopular among other people, he was disgusted with his looks (especially lips). His poetry both shows and hides this "ugliness". He was an admirer of Dylan Thomas and also Cesare Pavese, whose book he held in his hand when he committed suicide in Lyon by poisoning himself with gas.

== Books ==
- Masques pour une Ordalie (Paragraphes, ed. Millas-Martin, 1953)
- Poésies complètes (ed. Guy Chambelland, 1963; reprinted 1975), published after the author's death

== References and external links ==
- Roger-Arnould Rivière, PDF in French
