= Chénelette =

- Commune
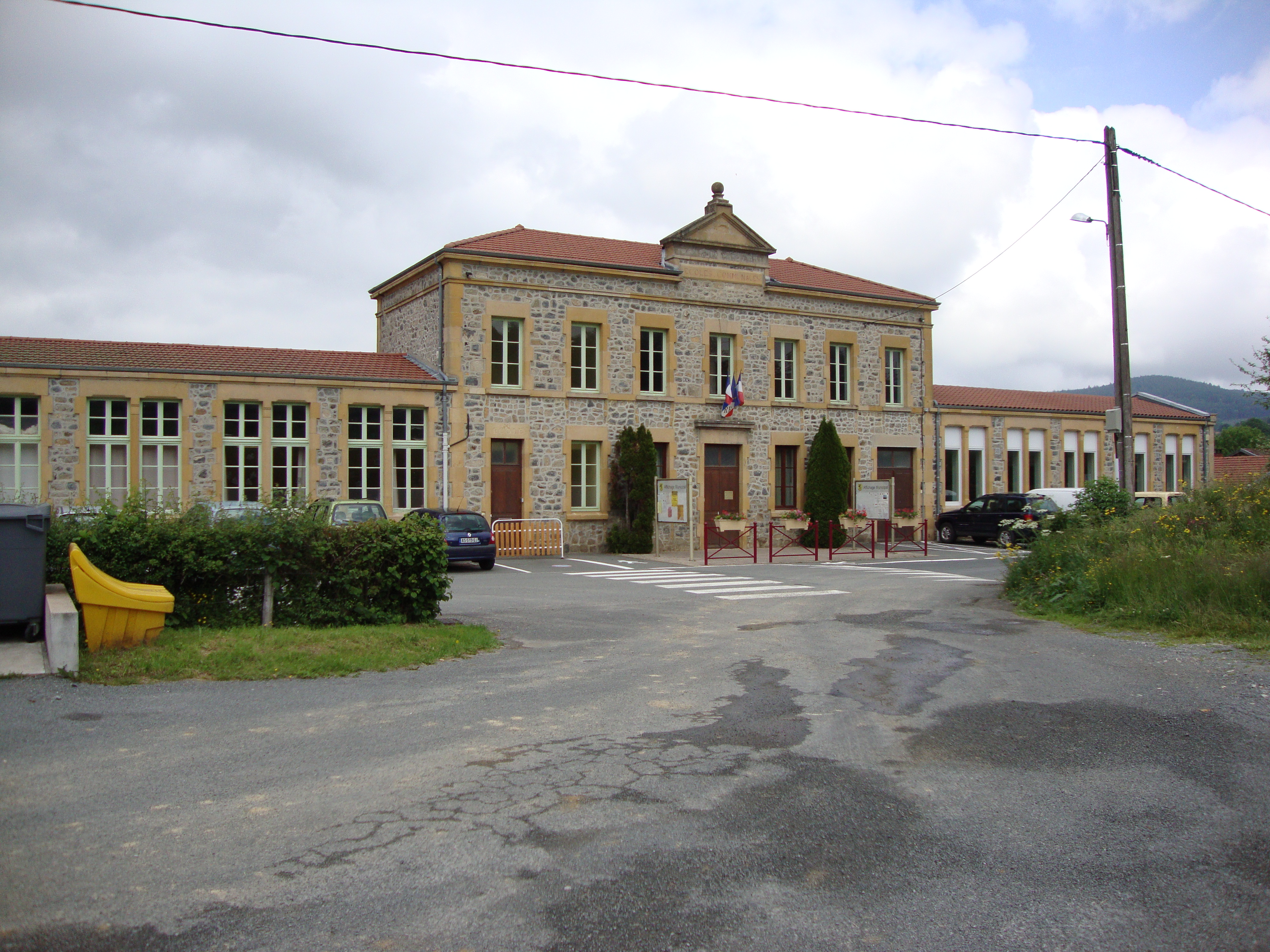
- The town hall and school in Chénelette

- Coat of arms
- Location of Chénelette
- Location within France Location within Auvergne-Rhône-Alpes
- Coordinates: 46°10′10″N 4°29′30″E
- Country: France
- Region: Auvergne-Rhône-Alpes
- Department: Rhône
- Arrondissement: Villefranche-sur-Saône
- Canton: Thizy-les-Bourgs
- Intercommunality: CA de l'Ouest Rhodanien

Government
  - Mayor (2020–2026): Bernadette Blein
- Area^{1}: 11.02 km^{2} (4.25 sq mi)
- Elevation: 660 m (2,170 ft)
- Highest elevation: 940 m (3,080 ft)
- Lowest elevation: 552 m (1,811 ft)
- Population (2023): 369
  - Density: 33.5/km^{2} (86.7/sq mi)
- Time zone: UTC+01:00 (CET)
  - Summer (DST): UTC+02:00 (CEST)
- INSEE/Postal code: 69054 /69430
- ^{1} French Land Register data, which excludes lakes, ponds, glaciers > 1 km^{2} (0.386 sq mi or 247 acres) and river estuaries.

Chénelette (French pronunciation: [ʃenlɛt]) is a commune in the Rhône department in eastern France. While there have been settlements in the region since before the Roman conquest of Gaul, the modern village of Chénelette first appears in records dating to the 14th century. Today it has a population of approximately 300 people.

== Geography ==
Chénelette is a small village of approximately 300 people (2012) located in the north-west of the Rhône Department, notably in the Beaujolais region. The surrounding landscape is one of forests, mountains (of the Massif Central), and pastures; and is frequented by hikers and outdoor enthusiasts. The village has an elevation of 660 meters, and is located approximately 60 kilometres north-northwest of Lyon (as the crow flies) and about 375 kilometres south-south west of Paris (as the crow flies). It lies between Roanne and Mâcon.

== History ==
Chénelette has its roots from the Middle Ages when, in the fourteenth century, a castle was built at the peak of the Mont Tourvéon (to the east of the village) by Louis de Pieux. Today the ruins of this castle can still be seen by climbing to the top of the mountain, which requires a considerable hike. Chénelette has been significant to the region because it has been a point of convergence for travellers from surrounding areas. During World War Two this region was occupied by German forces and was known for its considerable resistance.

== Demographics ==
Historical population

Year	Pop.	±% p.a.
1793	670	—
1821	529	−0.84%
1846	617	+0.62%
1872	671	+0.32%
1901	567	−0.58%
1926	411	−1.28%
1946	356	−0.72%
1962	320	−0.66%
1968	293	−1.46%

Year	Pop.	±% p.a.
1975	277	−0.80%
1982	270	−0.36%
1990	284	+0.63%
1999	315	+1.16%
2007	330	+0.58%
2012	317	−0.80%
2017	321	+0.25%
2023	369	+2.35%

Source: EHESS (1793-1999) and INSEE (1968-2023)

== See also ==
Communes of the Rhône department
