= Dième =

- Commune
- Coat of arms
- Location of Dième
- Location within France Location within Auvergne-Rhône-Alpes
- Coordinates: 45°57′45″N 4°27′59″E
- Country: France
- Region: Auvergne-Rhône-Alpes
- Department: Rhône
- Arrondissement: Villefranche-sur-Saône
- Canton: Tarare
- Intercommunality: CA de l'Ouest Rhodanien

Government
  - Mayor (2020–2026): Hubert Roche
- Area^{1}: 9.05 km^{2} (3.49 sq mi)
- Elevation: 330 m (1,080 ft)
- Highest elevation: 866 m (2,841 ft)
- Lowest elevation: 396 m (1,299 ft)
- Population (2023): 199
  - Density: 22.0/km^{2} (57.0/sq mi)
- Time zone: UTC+01:00 (CET)
  - Summer (DST): UTC+02:00 (CEST)
- INSEE/Postal code: 69075 /69170
- ^{1} French Land Register data, which excludes lakes, ponds, glaciers > 1 km^{2} (0.386 sq mi or 247 acres) and river estuaries.

Dième (French pronunciation: [djɛm]) is a commune in the Rhône department in eastern France.

== See also ==
- Communes of the Rhône department
