= Saint-Appolinaire =

- Commune
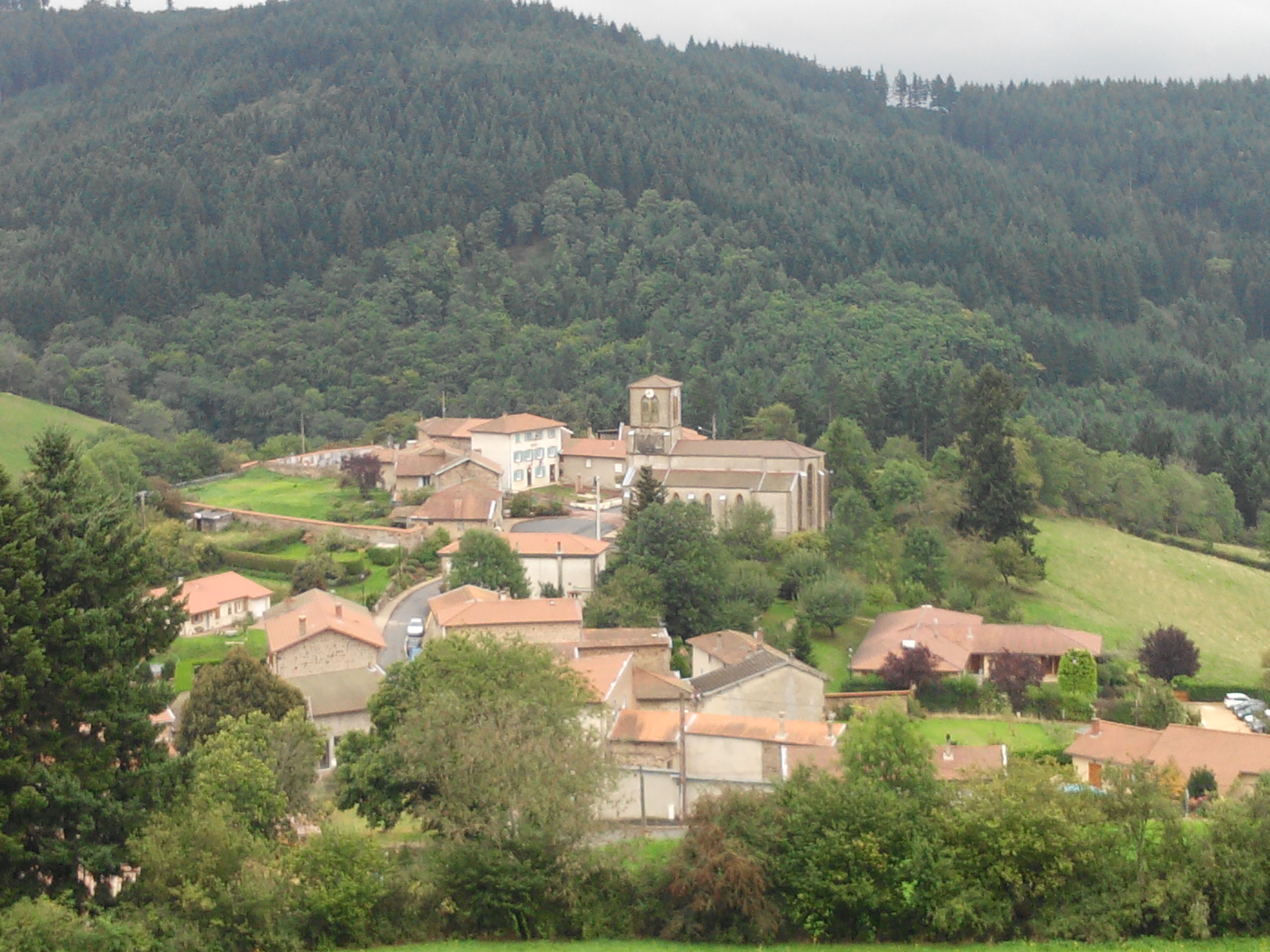
- Location of Saint-Appolinaire
- Location within France Location within Auvergne-Rhône-Alpes
- Coordinates: 45°58′40″N 4°25′27″E
- Country: France
- Region: Auvergne-Rhône-Alpes
- Department: Rhône
- Arrondissement: Villefranche-sur-Saône
- Canton: Tarare
- Intercommunality: CA de l'Ouest Rhodanien

Government
  - Mayor (2020–2026): Évelyne Prêle
- Area^{1}: 5.73 km^{2} (2.21 sq mi)
- Elevation: 700 m (2,300 ft)
- Highest elevation: 889 m (2,917 ft)
- Lowest elevation: 573 m (1,880 ft)
- Population (2023): 236
  - Density: 41.2/km^{2} (107/sq mi)
- Time zone: UTC+01:00 (CET)
  - Summer (DST): UTC+02:00 (CEST)
- INSEE/Postal code: 69181 /69170
- ^{1} French Land Register data, which excludes lakes, ponds, glaciers > 1 km^{2} (0.386 sq mi or 247 acres) and river estuaries.

Saint-Appolinaire (French pronunciation: [sɛ̃.t‿apɔlinɛʁ]) is a commune in the Rhône department in eastern France.

== See also ==
- Communes of the Rhône department
