= Saint-Jean-la-Bussière =

- Commune
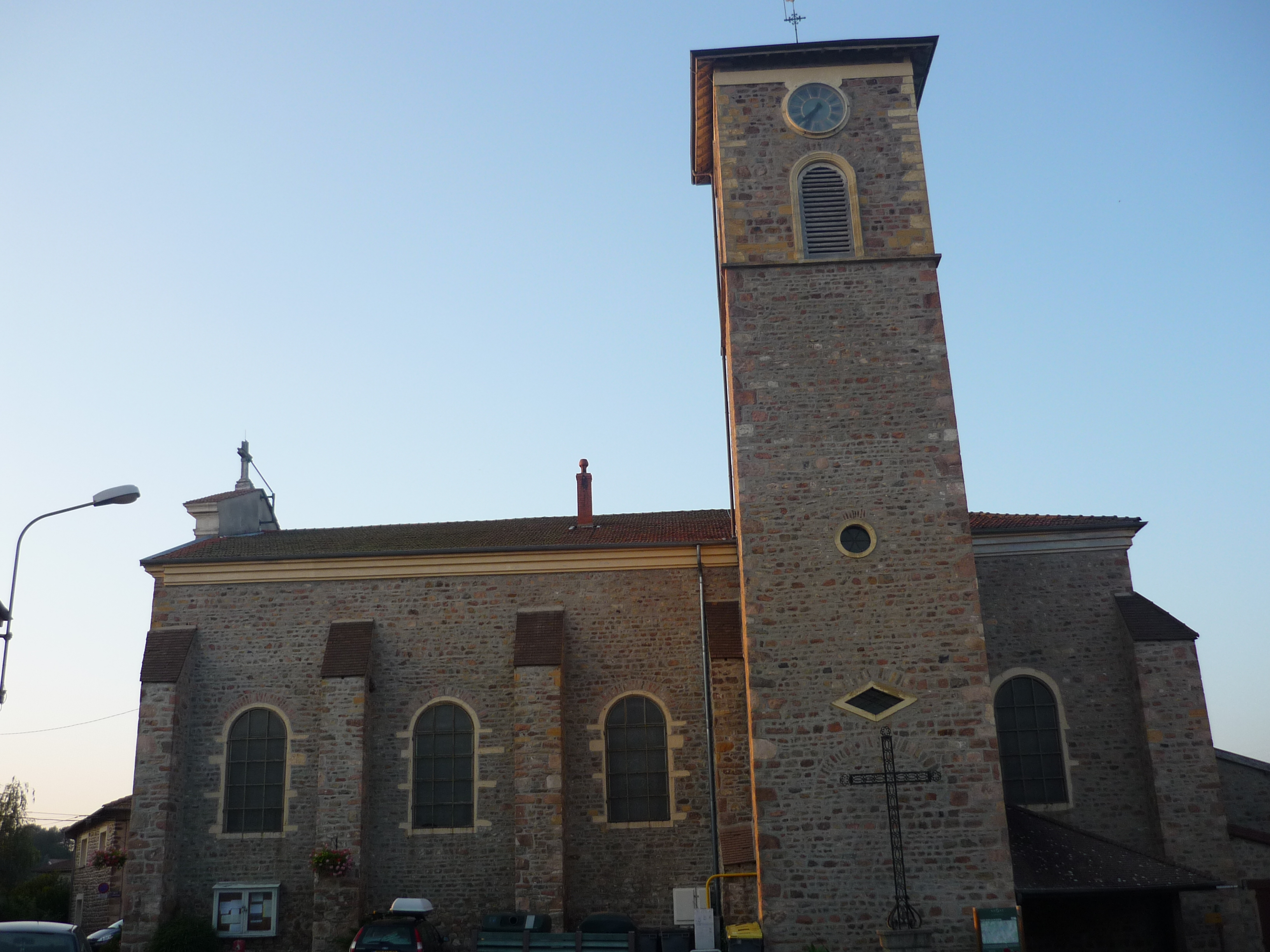
- The church of the Nativity of Saint-Jean-Baptiste, in Saint-Jean-la-Bussière

- Coat of arms
- Location of Saint-Jean-la-Bussière
- Location within France Location within Auvergne-Rhône-Alpes
- Coordinates: 46°00′05″N 4°19′28″E
- Country: France
- Region: Auvergne-Rhône-Alpes
- Department: Rhône
- Arrondissement: Villefranche-sur-Saône
- Canton: Thizy-les-Bourgs
- Intercommunality: CA de l'Ouest Rhodanien

Government
  - Mayor (2020–2026): Pascal Brun
- Area^{1}: 15.48 km^{2} (5.98 sq mi)
- Elevation: 500 m (1,600 ft)
- Highest elevation: 662 m (2,172 ft)
- Lowest elevation: 373 m (1,224 ft)
- Population (2023): 1,163
  - Density: 75.13/km^{2} (194.6/sq mi)
- Time zone: UTC+01:00 (CET)
  - Summer (DST): UTC+02:00 (CEST)
- INSEE/Postal code: 69214 /69550
- ^{1} French Land Register data, which excludes lakes, ponds, glaciers > 1 km^{2} (0.386 sq mi or 247 acres) and river estuaries.

Saint-Jean-la-Bussière (French pronunciation: [sɛ̃ ʒɑ̃ la bysjɛʁ]) is a commune in the Rhône department in eastern France.

== See also ==
- Communes of the Rhône department
