= Les Sauvages =

- Commune
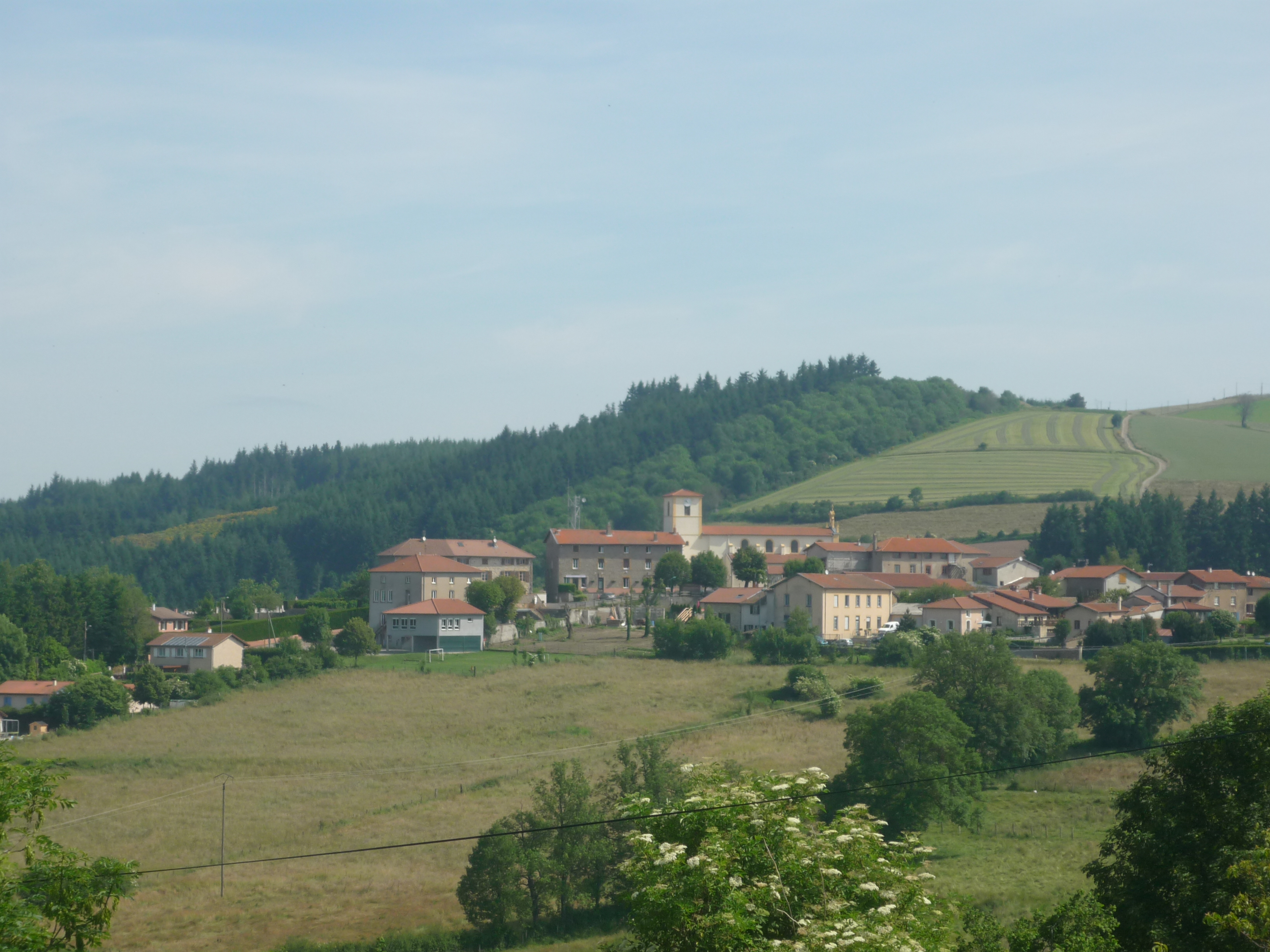
- A general view of Les Sauvages

- Coat of arms
- Location of Les Sauvages
- Location within France Location within Auvergne-Rhône-Alpes
- Coordinates: 45°55′33″N 4°22′38″E
- Country: France
- Region: Auvergne-Rhône-Alpes
- Department: Rhône
- Arrondissement: Villefranche-sur-Saône
- Canton: Tarare
- Intercommunality: CA de l'Ouest Rhodanien

Government
  - Mayor (2020–2026): Annick Lafay
- Area^{1}: 12.55 km^{2} (4.85 sq mi)
- Elevation: 720 m (2,360 ft)
- Highest elevation: 854 m (2,802 ft)
- Lowest elevation: 494 m (1,621 ft)
- Population (2023): 626
  - Density: 49.9/km^{2} (129/sq mi)
- Time zone: UTC+01:00 (CET)
  - Summer (DST): UTC+02:00 (CEST)
- INSEE/Postal code: 69174 /69170
- ^{1} French Land Register data, which excludes lakes, ponds, glaciers > 1 km^{2} (0.386 sq mi or 247 acres) and river estuaries.

Les Sauvages (French pronunciation: [le sovaʒ]) is a commune in the Rhône department in eastern France.

== See also ==
- Communes of the Rhône department
