= Louis Sonnery-Martin =

French politician

- Born: 5 January 1841; Tarare, Rhône, France
- Died: 23 December 1907 (aged 66); Lyon, Rhône, France
- Occupation: Politician

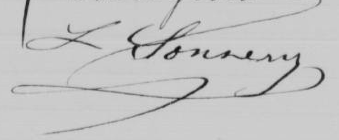
Signature.

Louis Sonnery-Martin (1841-1907) was a French politician. He served as a member of the Chamber of Deputies from 1893 to 1898, representing Rhône.

== Biography ==
Jean, Pierre, Xavier, Louis Sonnery was born on 5 January 1841, in Tarare and died on 23 December 1907, in Lyon. He was the son of Jean Charles Sonnery (1801-1863) and Marie-Mélanie Dufay (1801-1850). He called himself Louis Sonnery-Martin when he took his seat in Parliament.

He married Marie Thérèse Martin (1848–1927) on February 5, 1869, in Tarare.

A manufacturer between 1872 and 1881, he worked in his father-in-law's company (Martin velvet and plush toys) in Tarare (69), and lived at the factory. He was elected president of the Tarare Chamber of Commerce, a fitting reward for his tireless work in promoting industrial and commercial development in the region.

He became a general Departmental Council of Rhône department for the canton of Tarare in 1882, following the resignation of Nicolas-Marie Sève, who was appointed tax collector in Veyre. He held this position for 19 years, until 1901, before handing over to Eugène Ruffier.

In 1893, he ran for 1893 French legislative election in the 2nd district of Villefranche. In the first round, he obtained 6,607 votes, Félix Lachize 5,096 (incumbent representative), Lasalle 4,895, and Désigaud 1,005. He would sit with the liberals.

His absence from public debates proved fatal, as he failed to regain his seat in the 1898 legislative elections. He faced a local lawyer, Henri Palix, who defeated him by 10,689 votes to 8,548.

With his political career over, he devoted himself entirely to his professional activities.

In 1906, he acquired the Château de Chaintré, a 12th-century castle-palace located in Crêches-sur-Saône, (Saône-et-Loire).

He died in Lyon 2nd arrondissement on 23 December 1907, at the age of 66. He is buried in the cemetery in Tarare.
