= Saint-Romain-de-Popey =

- Commune
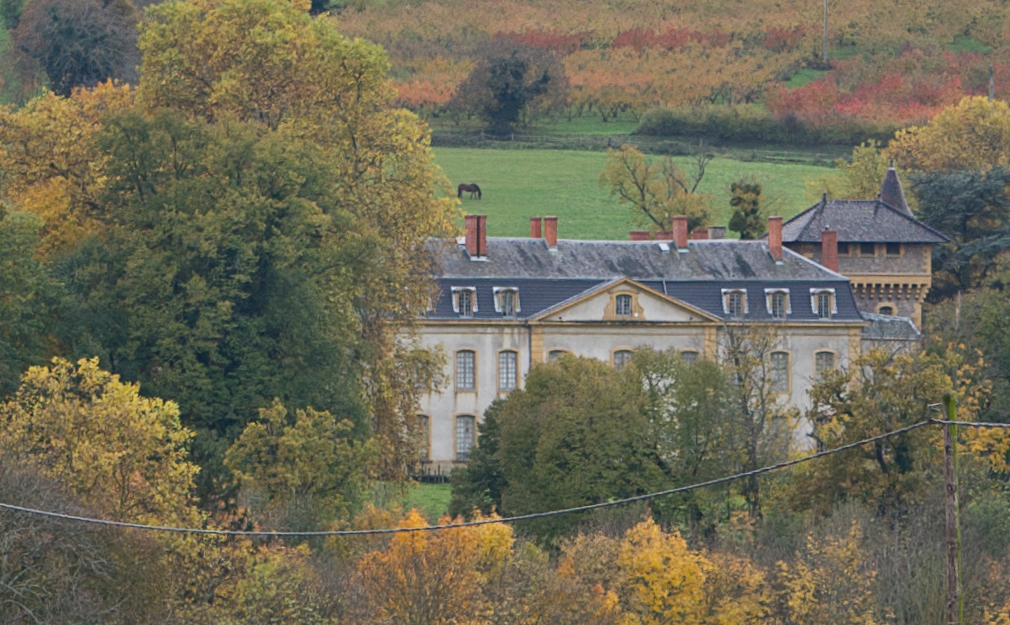
- The Château of Avauges, in Saint-Romain-de-Popey

- Coat of arms
- Location of Saint-Romain-de-Popey
- Location within France Location within Auvergne-Rhône-Alpes
- Coordinates: 45°50′53″N 4°31′55″E
- Country: France
- Region: Auvergne-Rhône-Alpes
- Department: Rhône
- Arrondissement: Villefranche-sur-Saône
- Canton: Tarare
- Intercommunality: CA de l'Ouest Rhodanien

Government
  - Mayor (2020–2026): Guy Joyet
- Area^{1}: 17.02 km^{2} (6.57 sq mi)
- Population (2023): 1,725
  - Density: 101.4/km^{2} (262.5/sq mi)
- Time zone: UTC+01:00 (CET)
  - Summer (DST): UTC+02:00 (CEST)
- INSEE/Postal code: 69234 /69490
- ^{1} French Land Register data, which excludes lakes, ponds, glaciers > 1 km^{2} (0.386 sq mi or 247 acres) and river estuaries.

Saint-Romain-de-Popey (French pronunciation: [sɛ̃ ʁɔmɛ̃ də pɔpɛ]) is a commune in the Rhône department in eastern France.

== Sites and Monuments ==
- Château d'Avauges
- Chapelle de Clévy

== See also ==
- Communes of the Rhône department
