= Vindry-sur-Turdine =

- Commune
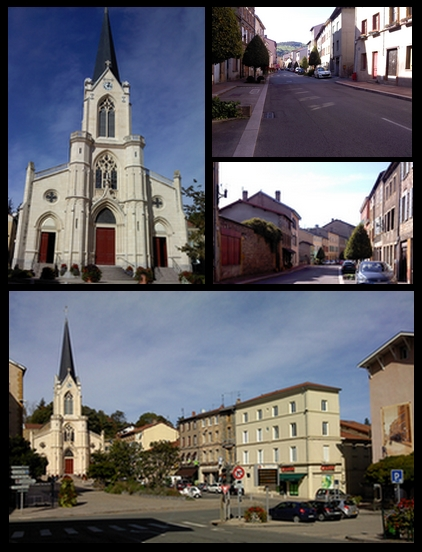
- Views of Pontcharra-sur-Turdine, including the church
- Location of Vindry-sur-Turdine
- Location within France Location within Auvergne-Rhône-Alpes
- Coordinates: 45°52′30″N 4°29′26″E
- Country: France
- Region: Auvergne-Rhône-Alpes
- Department: Rhône
- Arrondissement: Villefranche-sur-Saône
- Canton: Tarare
- Intercommunality: CA de l'Ouest Rhodanien

Government
  - Mayor (2020–2026): Christian Pradel
- Area^{1}: 23.87 km^{2} (9.22 sq mi)
- Highest elevation: 688 m (2,257 ft)
- Lowest elevation: 280 m (920 ft)
- Population (2023): 5,305
  - Density: 222.2/km^{2} (575.6/sq mi)
- Time zone: UTC+01:00 (CET)
  - Summer (DST): UTC+02:00 (CEST)
- INSEE/Postal code: 69157 /69490
- ^{1} French Land Register data, which excludes lakes, ponds, glaciers > 1 km^{2} (0.386 sq mi or 247 acres) and river estuaries.

Vindry-sur-Turdine (French pronunciation: [vɛ̃dʁi syʁ tyʁdin], lit. 'Vindry on Turdine') is a commune in the Rhône department in eastern France. It was established on 1 January 2019 by merger of the former communes of Pontcharra-sur-Turdine (the seat), Dareizé, Les Olmes and Saint-Loup.

== Population ==
The population data given in the table below refer to the commune in its geography as of January 2025.

Historical population
Year	Pop.	±% p.a.
1968	2,484	—
1975	2,896	+2.22%
1982	3,390	+2.28%
1990	3,839	+1.57%
1999	4,032	+0.55%
2007	4,593	+1.64%
2012	4,728	+0.58%
2017	5,133	+1.66%
2023	5,305	+0.55%
Source: INSEE

== See also ==
- Communes of the Rhône department
