= Saint-Loup, Rhône =

Saint-Loup
- Part of Vindry-sur-Turdine
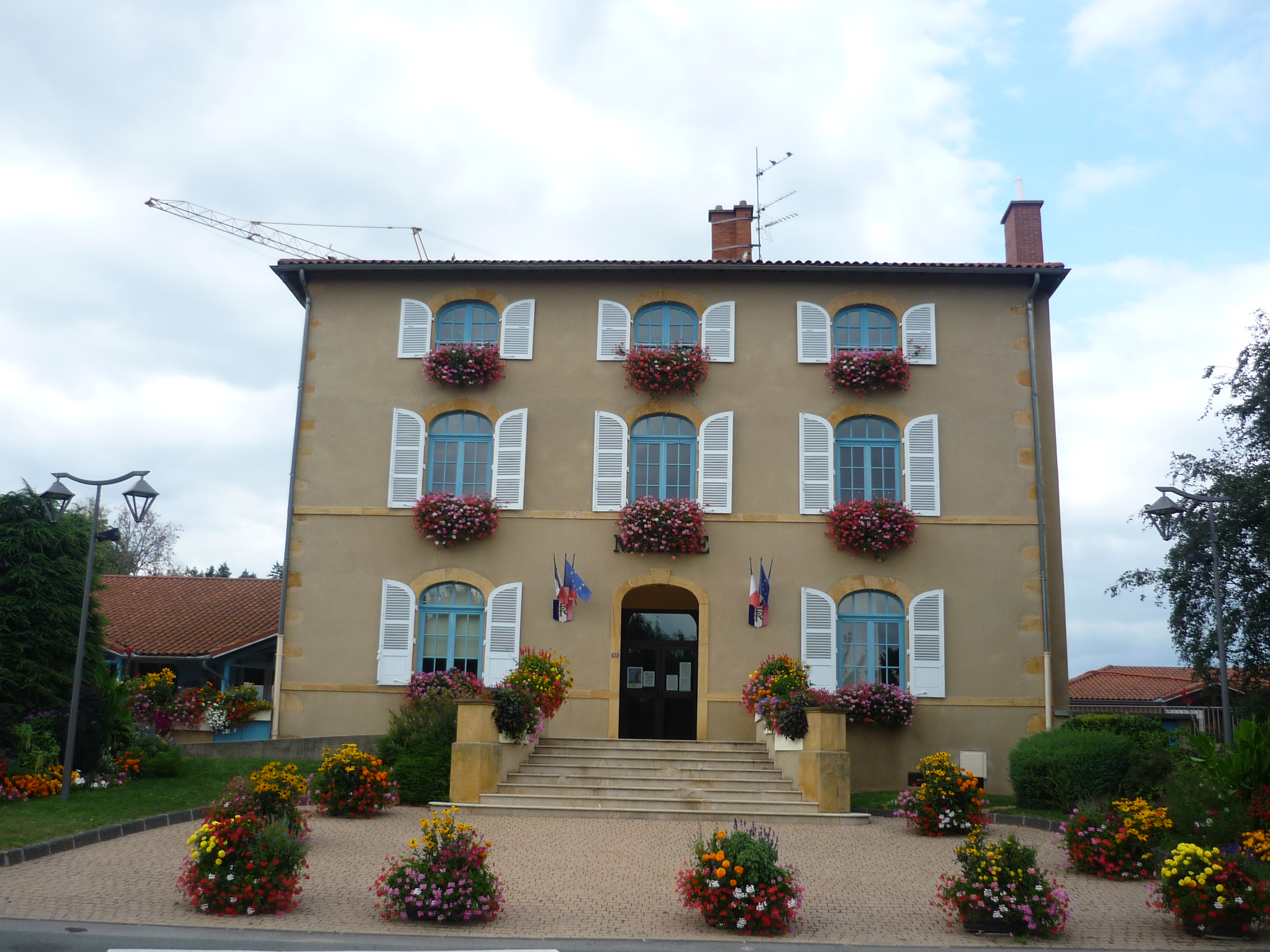
- The town hall in Saint-Loup

- Coat of arms
- Location of Saint-Loup
- Location within France Location within Auvergne-Rhône-Alpes
- Coordinates: 45°53′43″N 4°29′24″E
- Country: France
- Region: Auvergne-Rhône-Alpes
- Department: Rhône
- Arrondissement: Villefranche-sur-Saône
- Canton: Tarare
- Commune: Vindry-sur-Turdine
- Area^{1}: 9.65 km^{2} (3.73 sq mi)
- Elevation: 400 m (1,300 ft)
- Highest elevation: 688 m (2,257 ft)
- Lowest elevation: 280 m (920 ft)
- Population (2022): 1,129
  - Density: 117/km^{2} (303/sq mi)
- Time zone: UTC+01:00 (CET)
  - Summer (DST): UTC+02:00 (CEST)
- Postal code: 69490
- ^{1} French Land Register data, which excludes lakes, ponds, glaciers > 1 km^{2} (0.386 sq mi or 247 acres) and river estuaries.

Saint-Loup (French pronunciation: [sɛ̃ lu]) is a former commune in the Rhône department in eastern France. On 1 January 2019, it was merged into the new commune Vindry-sur-Turdine.

== See also ==
- Communes of the Rhône department
