= Ancy =

- Commune
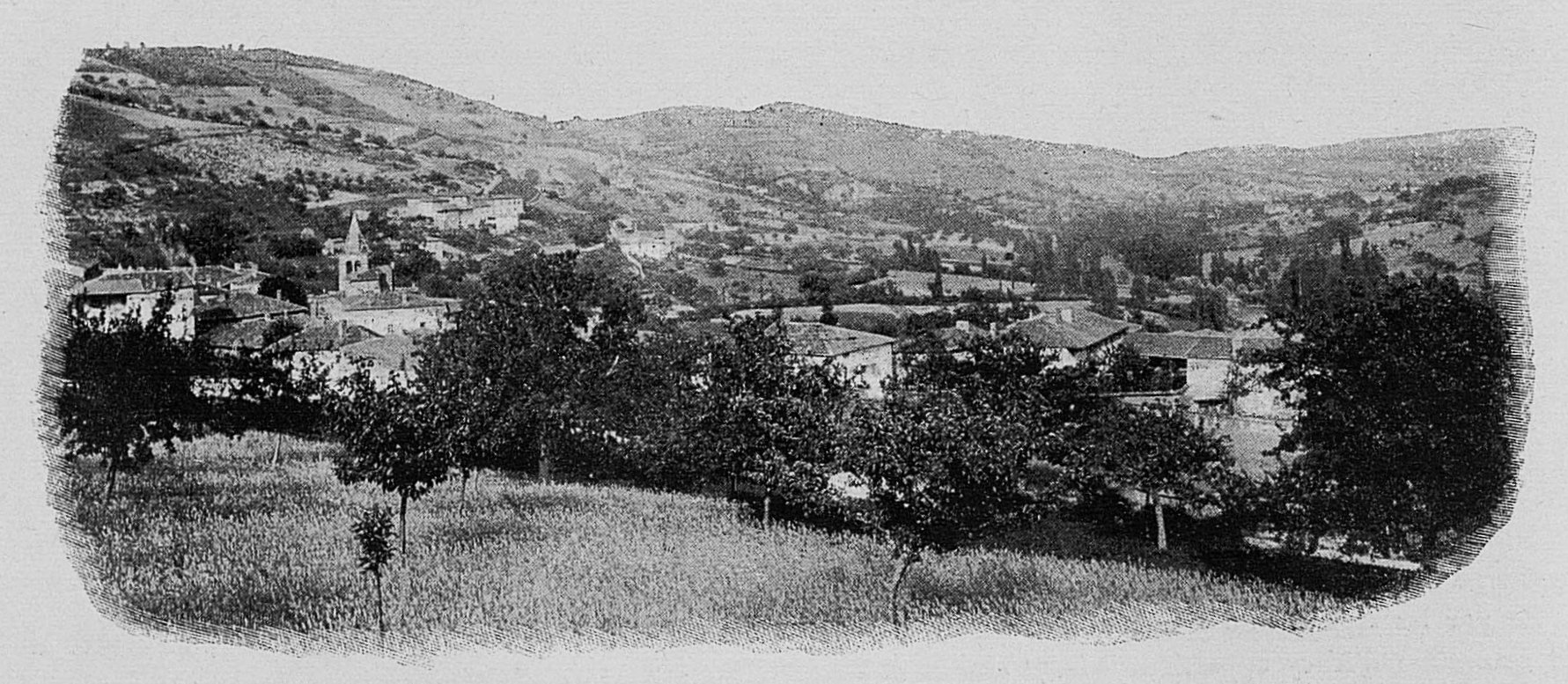
- A general view of Ancy, at the beginning of the 20th century
- Location of Ancy
- Location within France Location within Auvergne-Rhône-Alpes
- Coordinates: 45°50′17″N 4°30′33″E
- Country: France
- Region: Auvergne-Rhône-Alpes
- Department: Rhône
- Arrondissement: Villefranche-sur-Saône
- Canton: Tarare
- Intercommunality: CA de l'Ouest Rhodanien

Government
  - Mayor (2020–2026): Christine de Saint-Jean
- Area^{1}: 11.84 km^{2} (4.57 sq mi)
- Elevation: 460 m (1,510 ft)
- Highest elevation: 852 m (2,795 ft)
- Lowest elevation: 394 m (1,293 ft)
- Population (2023): 671
  - Density: 56.7/km^{2} (147/sq mi)
- Time zone: UTC+01:00 (CET)
  - Summer (DST): UTC+02:00 (CEST)
- INSEE/Postal code: 69008 /69490
- ^{1} French Land Register data, which excludes lakes, ponds, glaciers > 1 km^{2} (0.386 sq mi or 247 acres) and river estuaries.

Ancy (French pronunciation: [ɑ̃si]) is a commune in the Rhône department in eastern France.

== See also ==
Communes of the Rhône department
