= Ronno =

- Commune
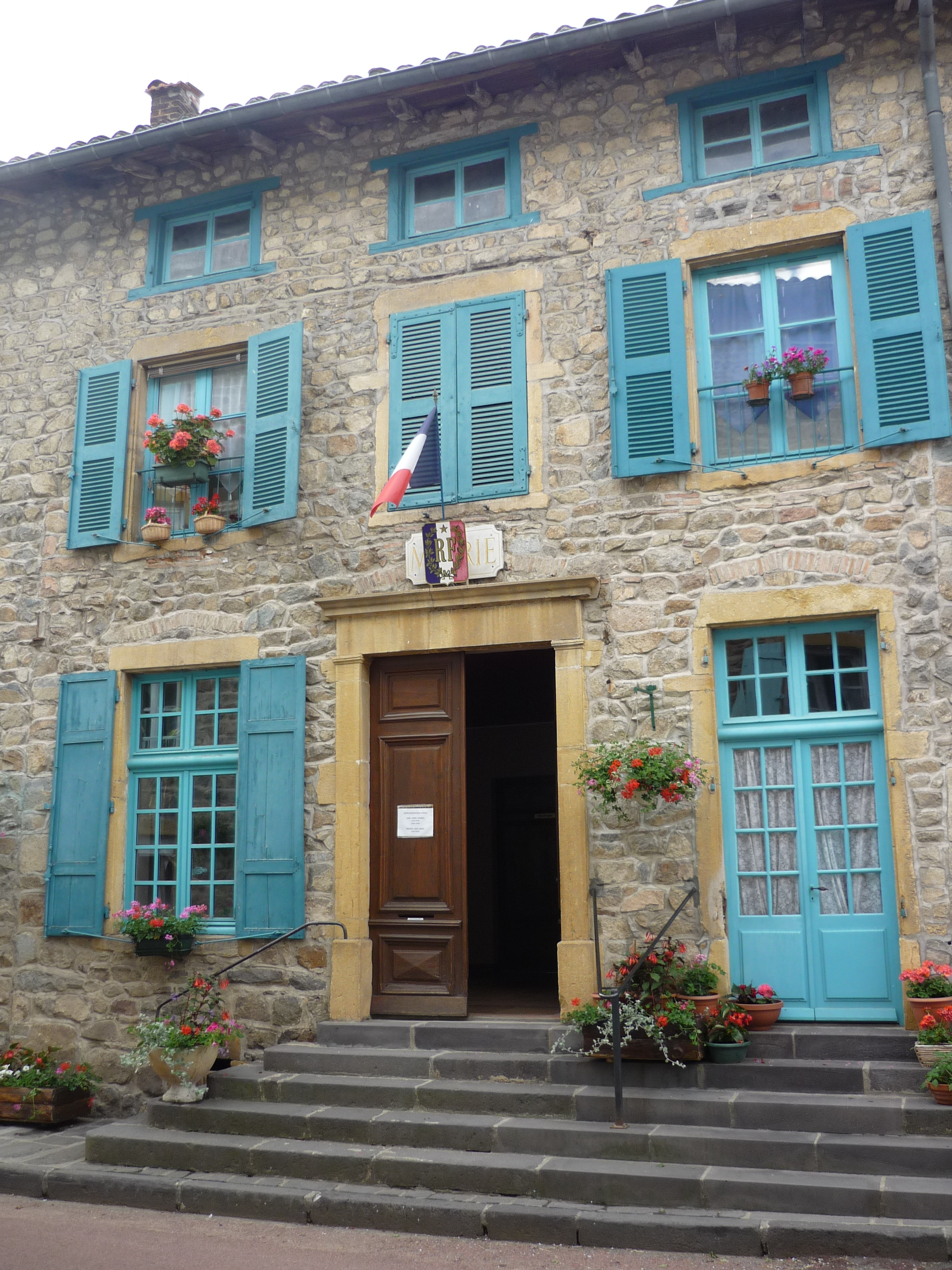
- The town hall in Ronno

- Coat of arms
- Location of Ronno
- Location within France Location within Auvergne-Rhône-Alpes
- Coordinates: 45°59′08″N 4°22′59″E
- Country: France
- Region: Auvergne-Rhône-Alpes
- Department: Rhône
- Arrondissement: Villefranche-sur-Saône
- Canton: Thizy-les-Bourgs
- Intercommunality: CA de l'Ouest Rhodanien

Government
  - Mayor (2020–2026): Philippe Lorchel
- Area^{1}: 22.92 km^{2} (8.85 sq mi)
- Elevation: 509 m (1,670 ft)
- Highest elevation: 888 m (2,913 ft)
- Lowest elevation: 418 m (1,371 ft)
- Population (2023): 658
  - Density: 28.7/km^{2} (74.4/sq mi)
- Time zone: UTC+01:00 (CET)
  - Summer (DST): UTC+02:00 (CEST)
- INSEE/Postal code: 69169 /69550
- ^{1} French Land Register data, which excludes lakes, ponds, glaciers > 1 km^{2} (0.386 sq mi or 247 acres) and river estuaries.

Ronno (French pronunciation: [ʁɔno]) is a commune of the Rhône département, in France.

== Demographics ==
In 2019, the population was 639. Inhabitants are known as Ronnis.

== See also ==
- Communes of the Rhône department
