= Saint-Forgeux =

- Commune
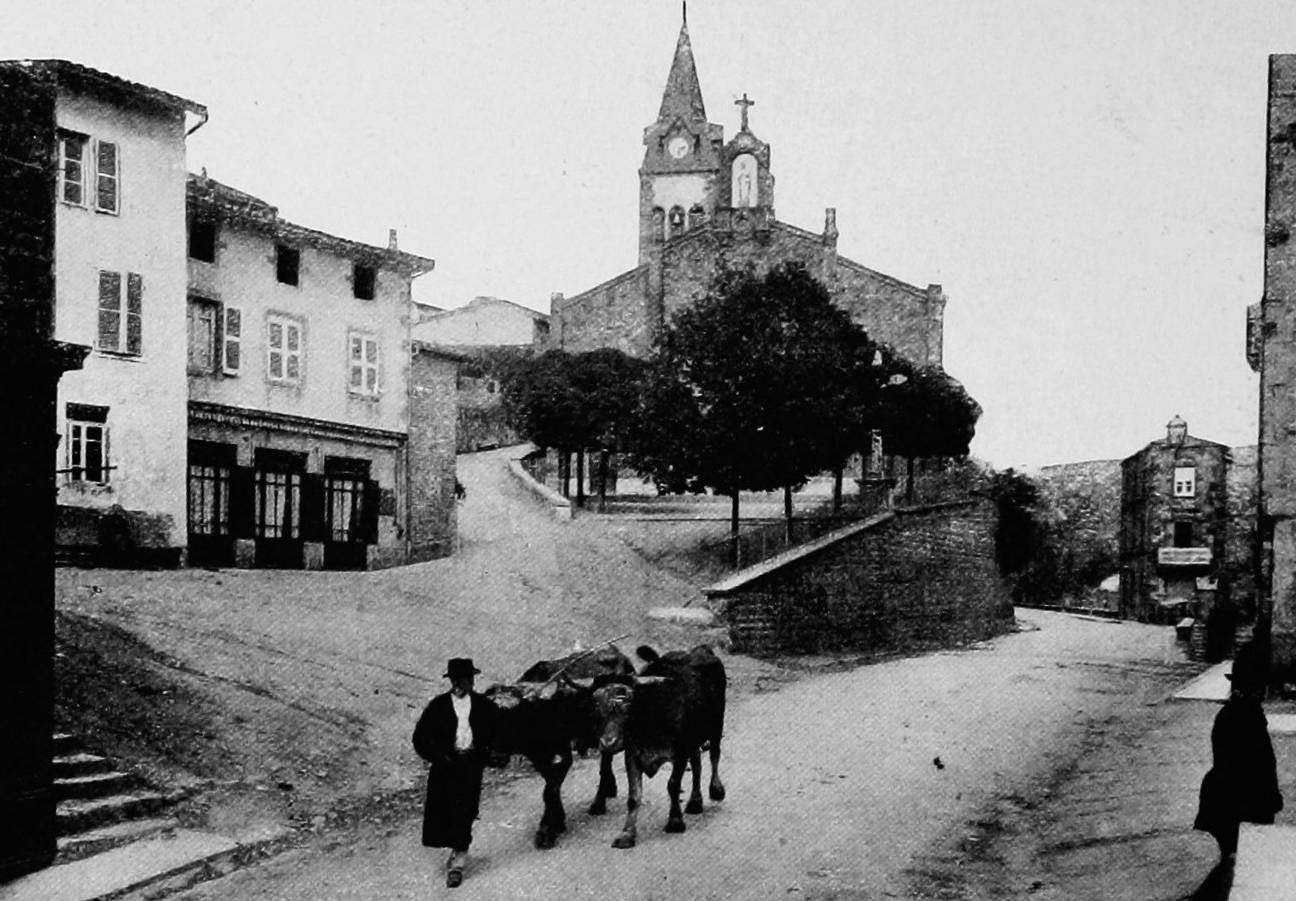
- Saint-Forgeux in the early 20th century
- Location of Saint-Forgeux
- Location within France Location within Auvergne-Rhône-Alpes
- Coordinates: 45°51′35″N 4°28′32″E
- Country: France
- Region: Auvergne-Rhône-Alpes
- Department: Rhône
- Arrondissement: Villefranche-sur-Saône
- Canton: Tarare
- Intercommunality: CA de l'Ouest Rhodanien

Government
  - Mayor (2020–2026): Gilles Dubessy
- Area^{1}: 22.27 km^{2} (8.60 sq mi)
- Elevation: 410 m (1,350 ft)
- Highest elevation: 800 m (2,600 ft)
- Lowest elevation: 340 m (1,120 ft)
- Population (2023): 1,544
  - Density: 69.33/km^{2} (179.6/sq mi)
- Time zone: UTC+01:00 (CET)
  - Summer (DST): UTC+02:00 (CEST)
- INSEE/Postal code: 69200 /69490
- ^{1} French Land Register data, which excludes lakes, ponds, glaciers > 1 km^{2} (0.386 sq mi or 247 acres) and river estuaries.

Saint-Forgeux (French pronunciation: [sɛ̃ fɔʁʒø]) is a commune in the Rhône department in eastern France.

== See also ==
- Communes of the Rhône department
