= Joux =

Joux Jor (Arpitan)
- Commune
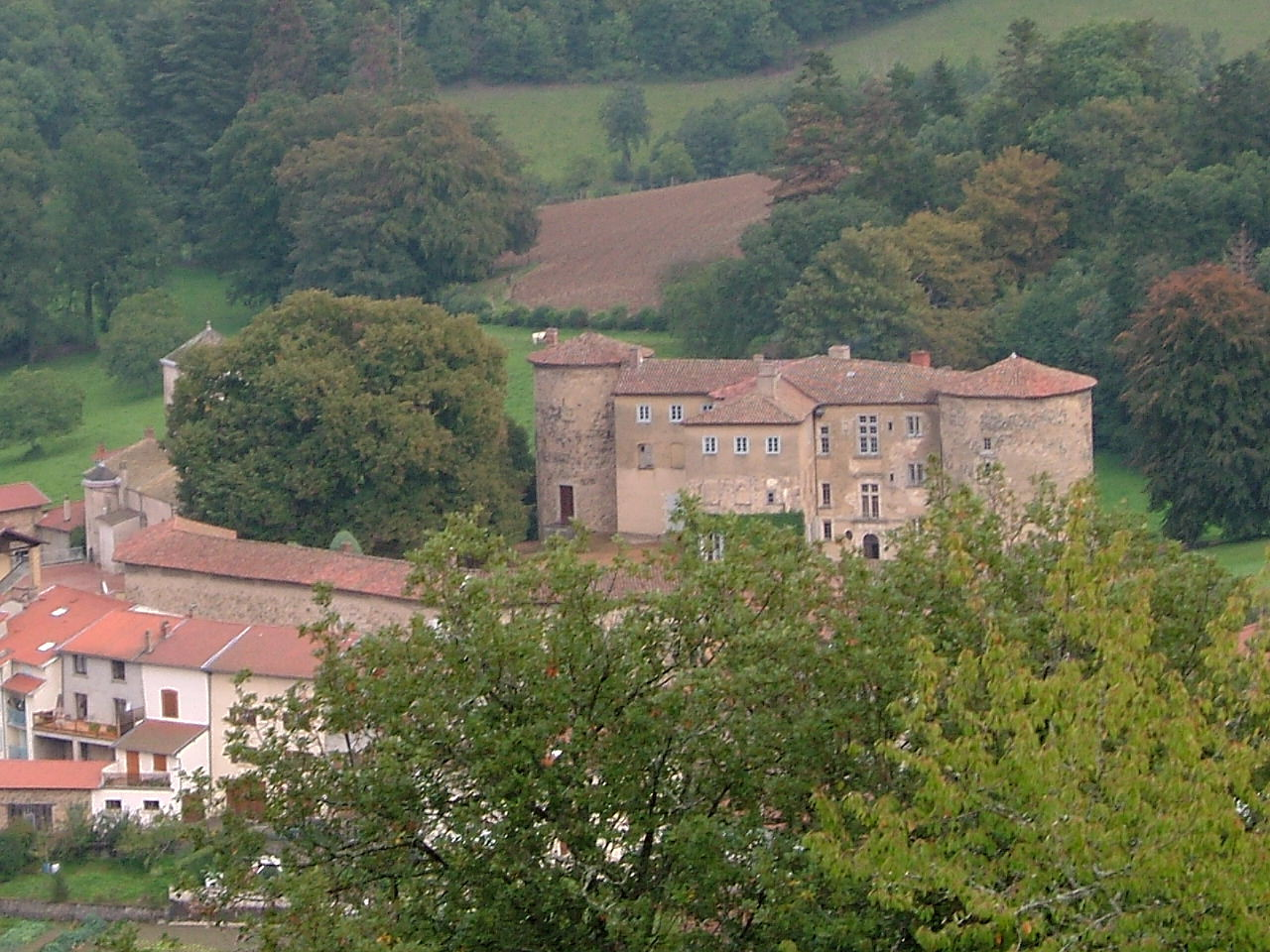
- Chateau

- Coat of arms
- Location of Joux
- Location within France Location within Auvergne-Rhône-Alpes
- Coordinates: 45°53′17″N 4°22′22″E
- Country: France
- Region: Auvergne-Rhône-Alpes
- Department: Rhône
- Arrondissement: Villefranche-sur-Saône
- Canton: Tarare
- Intercommunality: CA de l'Ouest Rhodanien

Government
  - Mayor (2020–2026): Nadine Noyel
- Area^{1}: 25.18 km^{2} (9.72 sq mi)
- Elevation: 300 m (980 ft)
- Highest elevation: 892 m (2,927 ft)
- Lowest elevation: 410 m (1,350 ft)
- Population (2023): 752
  - Density: 29.9/km^{2} (77.3/sq mi)
- Time zone: UTC+01:00 (CET)
  - Summer (DST): UTC+02:00 (CEST)
- INSEE/Postal code: 69102 /69170
- ^{1} French Land Register data, which excludes lakes, ponds, glaciers > 1 km^{2} (0.386 sq mi or 247 acres) and river estuaries.

Joux (French pronunciation: [ʒu]; Arpitan: Jor) is a commune in the Rhône department in eastern France.

== See also ==
- Communes of the Rhône department
