= Ranchal =

- Commune
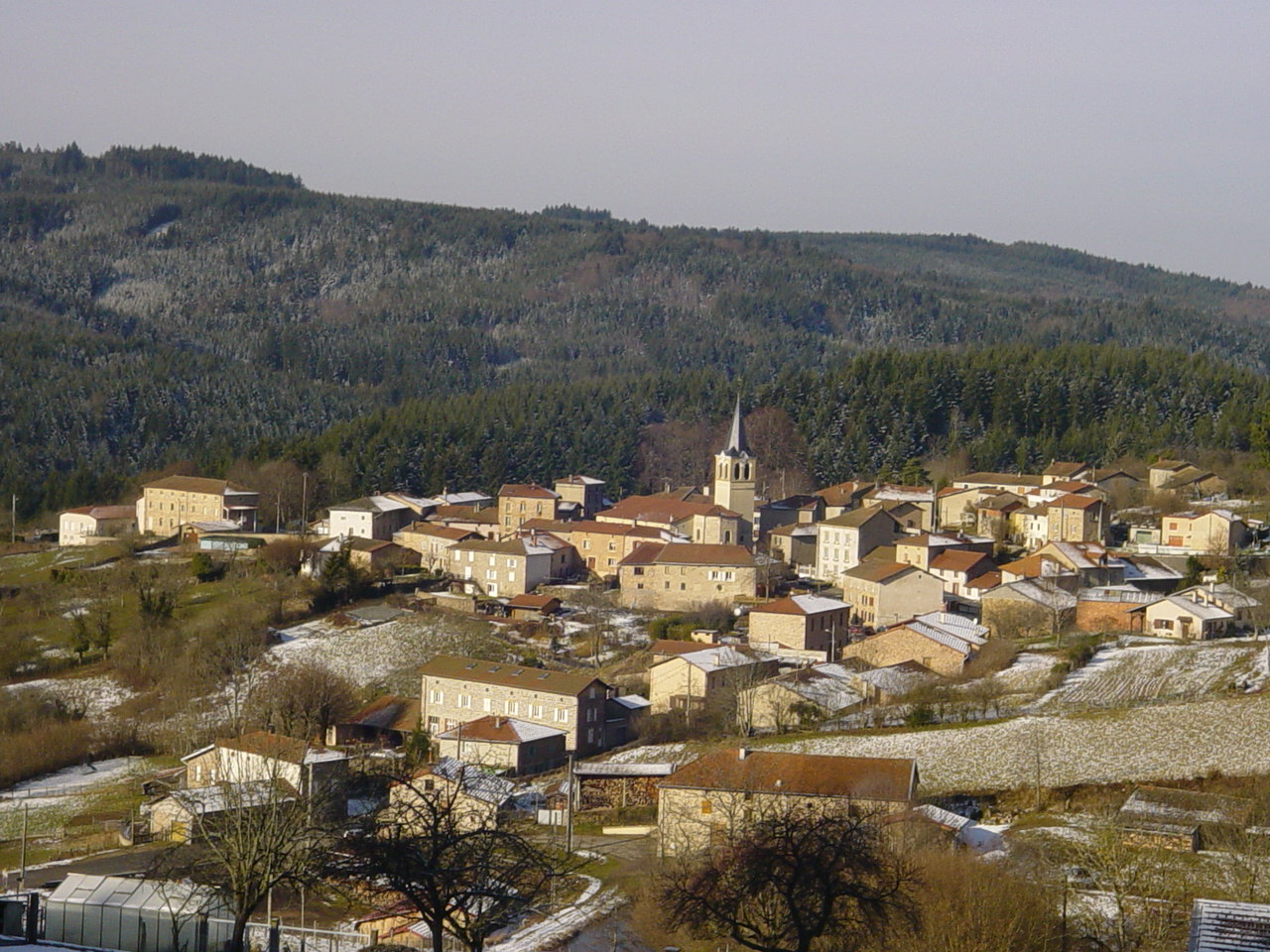
- A general view of Ranchal

- Coat of arms
- Location of Ranchal
- Location within France Location within Auvergne-Rhône-Alpes
- Coordinates: 46°07′48″N 4°23′56″E
- Country: France
- Region: Auvergne-Rhône-Alpes
- Department: Rhône
- Arrondissement: Villefranche-sur-Saône
- Canton: Thizy-les-Bourgs
- Intercommunality: CA de l'Ouest Rhodanien

Government
  - Mayor (2020–2026): Jacques de Bussy
- Area^{1}: 15.14 km^{2} (5.85 sq mi)
- Elevation: 800 m (2,600 ft)
- Highest elevation: 907 m (2,976 ft)
- Lowest elevation: 574 m (1,883 ft)
- Population (2023): 304
  - Density: 20.1/km^{2} (52.0/sq mi)
- Time zone: UTC+01:00 (CET)
  - Summer (DST): UTC+02:00 (CEST)
- INSEE/Postal code: 69164 /69470
- ^{1} French Land Register data, which excludes lakes, ponds, glaciers > 1 km^{2} (0.386 sq mi or 247 acres) and river estuaries.

Ranchal (French pronunciation: [ʁɑ̃ʃal]) is a commune in the Rhône department in eastern France.

== See also ==
- Communes of the Rhône department
