= Sarcey, Rhône =

Sarcey
- Commune
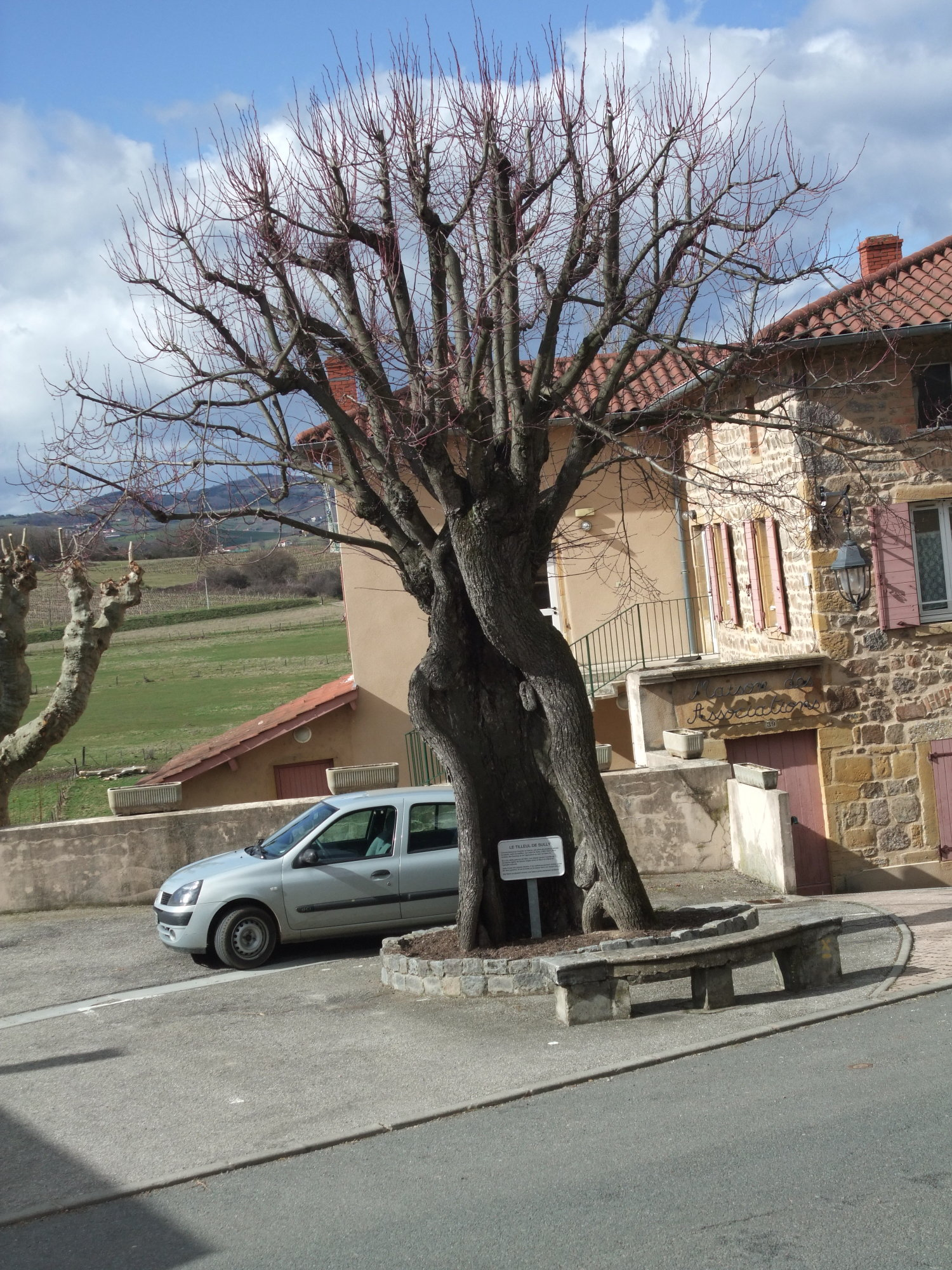
- Old tilia at the center of Sarcey

- Coat of arms
- Location of Sarcey
- Location within France Location within Auvergne-Rhône-Alpes
- Coordinates: 45°52′49″N 4°33′38″E
- Country: France
- Region: Auvergne-Rhône-Alpes
- Department: Rhône
- Arrondissement: Villefranche-sur-Saône
- Canton: Tarare

Government
  - Mayor (2020–2026): Olivier Laroche
- Area^{1}: 9.99 km^{2} (3.86 sq mi)
- Elevation: 400 m (1,300 ft)
- Highest elevation: 427 m (1,401 ft)
- Lowest elevation: 257 m (843 ft)
- Population (2023): 980
  - Density: 98/km^{2} (250/sq mi)
- Time zone: UTC+01:00 (CET)
  - Summer (DST): UTC+02:00 (CEST)
- INSEE/Postal code: 69173 /69490
- ^{1} French Land Register data, which excludes lakes, ponds, glaciers > 1 km^{2} (0.386 sq mi or 247 acres) and river estuaries.

Sarcey (French pronunciation: [saʁsɛ]) is a commune in the Rhône department in eastern France.

== See also ==
- Communes of the Rhône department
