= Saint-Just-d'Avray =

- Commune
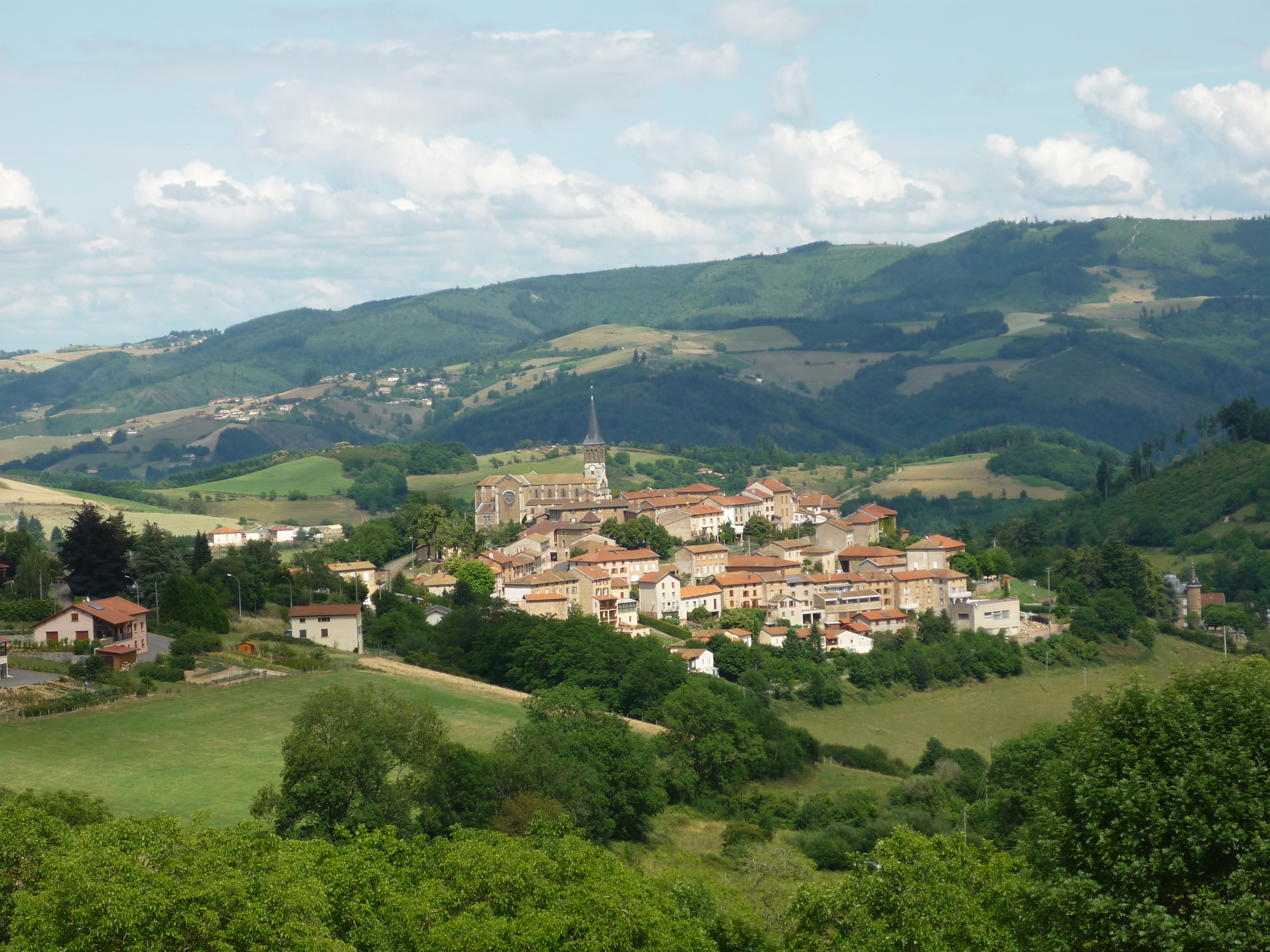
- The church and surrounding buildings in Saint-Just-d'Avray
- Location of Saint-Just-d'Avray
- Location within France Location within Auvergne-Rhône-Alpes
- Coordinates: 46°00′10″N 4°26′48″E
- Country: France
- Region: Auvergne-Rhône-Alpes
- Department: Rhône
- Arrondissement: Villefranche-sur-Saône
- Canton: Tarare
- Intercommunality: CA de l'Ouest Rhodanien

Government
  - Mayor (2020–2026): Christine Galilei
- Area^{1}: 17.5 km^{2} (6.8 sq mi)
- Elevation: 557 m (1,827 ft)
- Highest elevation: 898 m (2,946 ft)
- Lowest elevation: 323 m (1,060 ft)
- Population (2023): 741
  - Density: 42.3/km^{2} (110/sq mi)
- Demonym: Les Chouettes
- Time zone: UTC+01:00 (CET)
  - Summer (DST): UTC+02:00 (CEST)
- INSEE/Postal code: 69217 /69870
- ^{1} French Land Register data, which excludes lakes, ponds, glaciers > 1 km^{2} (0.386 sq mi or 247 acres) and river estuaries.

Saint-Just-d'Avray (French pronunciation: [sɛ̃ ʒy davʁɛ]) is a commune in the Rhône department in eastern France.

== See also ==
- Communes of the Rhône department
