= Affoux =

- Commune
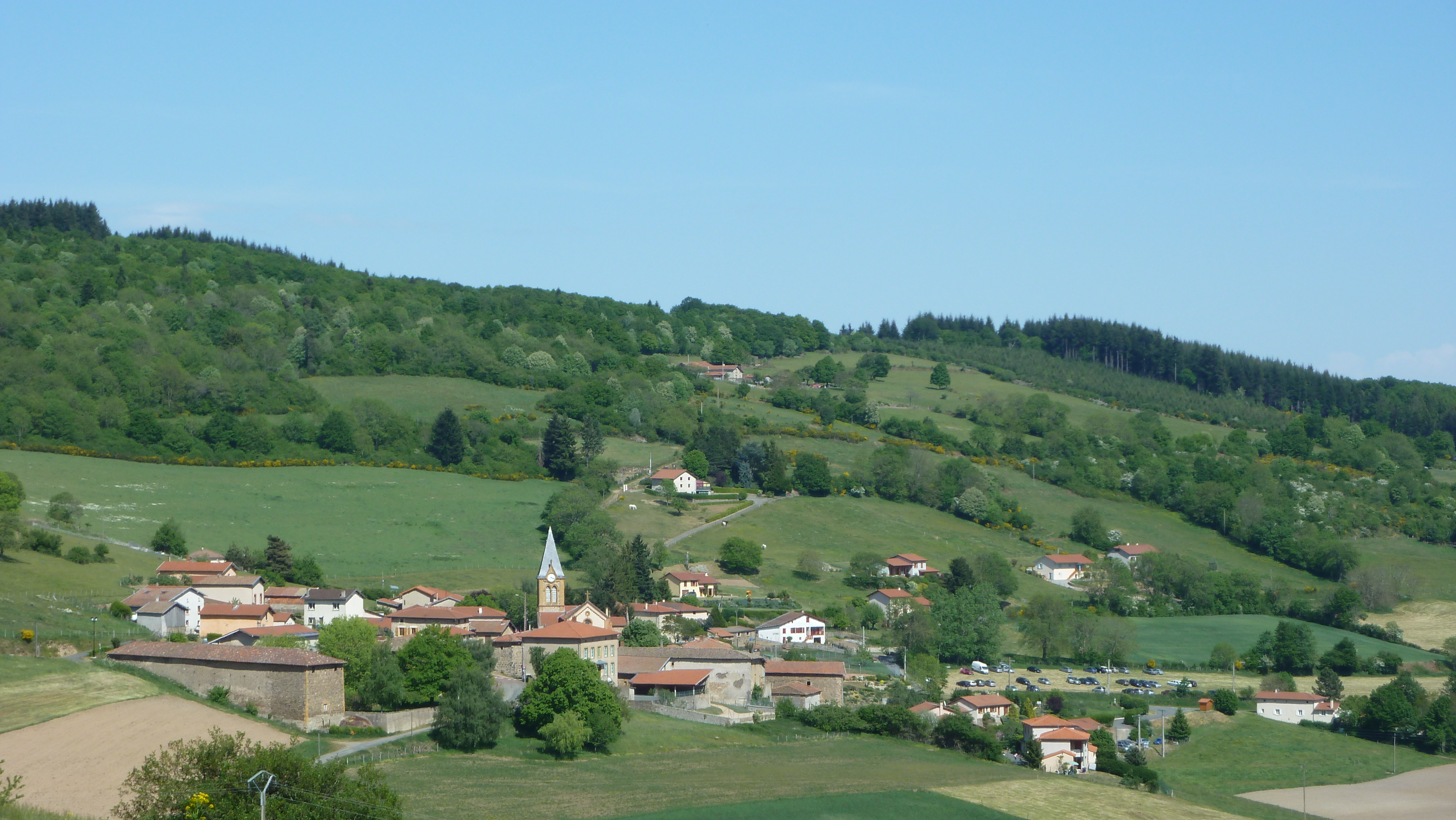
- A general view of Affoux
- Location of Affoux
- Location within France Location within Auvergne-Rhône-Alpes
- Coordinates: 45°50′45″N 4°24′15″E
- Country: France
- Region: Auvergne-Rhône-Alpes
- Department: Rhône
- Arrondissement: Villefranche-sur-Saône
- Canton: Tarare
- Intercommunality: CA de l'Ouest Rhodanien

Government
  - Mayor (2026–32): Sophie Chassagnel
- Area^{1}: 10.65 km^{2} (4.11 sq mi)
- Elevation: 800 m (2,600 ft)
- Highest elevation: 960 m (3,150 ft)
- Lowest elevation: 498 m (1,634 ft)
- Population (2023): 398
  - Density: 37.4/km^{2} (96.8/sq mi)
- Time zone: UTC+01:00 (CET)
  - Summer (DST): UTC+02:00 (CEST)
- INSEE/Postal code: 69001 /69170
- ^{1} French Land Register data, which excludes lakes, ponds, glaciers > 1 km^{2} (0.386 sq mi or 247 acres) and river estuaries.

Affoux (French pronunciation: [afu]) is a commune in the Rhône department in eastern France.

== Population ==
Historical population
Year	Pop.	±% p.a.
1968	194	—
1975	183	−0.83%
1982	189	+0.46%
1990	202	+0.83%
1999	248	+2.31%
2007	314	+2.99%
2012	340	+1.60%
2017	369	+1.65%
2023	398	+1.27%
Source: INSEE

== See also ==
Communes of the Rhône department
