= Lamure-sur-Azergues =

- Commune
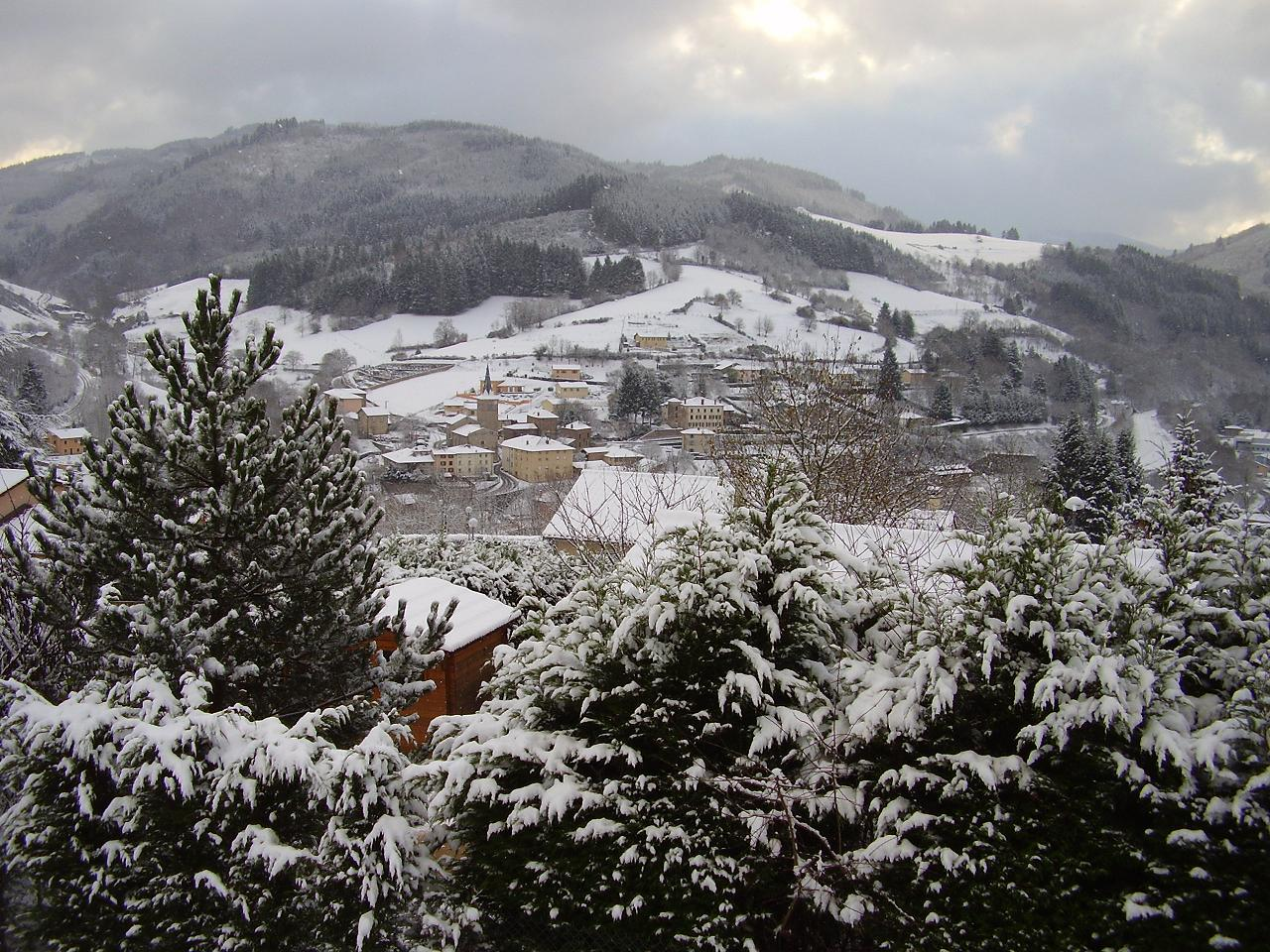
- Lamure-sur-Azergues in the snow in November 2010

- Coat of arms
- Location of Lamure-sur-Azergues
- Location within France Location within Auvergne-Rhône-Alpes
- Coordinates: 46°03′47″N 4°29′34″E
- Country: France
- Region: Auvergne-Rhône-Alpes
- Department: Rhône
- Arrondissement: Villefranche-sur-Saône
- Canton: Tarare
- Intercommunality: CA de l'Ouest Rhodanien

Government
  - Mayor (2020–2026): Marc Desplaces
- Area^{1}: 15.61 km^{2} (6.03 sq mi)
- Elevation: 383 m (1,257 ft)
- Highest elevation: 885 m (2,904 ft)
- Lowest elevation: 351 m (1,152 ft)
- Population (2023): 1,048
  - Density: 67.14/km^{2} (173.9/sq mi)
- Time zone: UTC+01:00 (CET)
  - Summer (DST): UTC+02:00 (CEST)
- INSEE/Postal code: 69107 /69870
- ^{1} French Land Register data, which excludes lakes, ponds, glaciers > 1 km^{2} (0.386 sq mi or 247 acres) and river estuaries.

Lamure-sur-Azergues (French pronunciation: [lamyʁ syʁ azɛʁɡ], literally Lamure on Azergues) is a commune in the Rhône department in eastern France.

== See also ==
- Communes of the Rhône department
