= Saint-Marcel-l'Éclairé =

- Commune
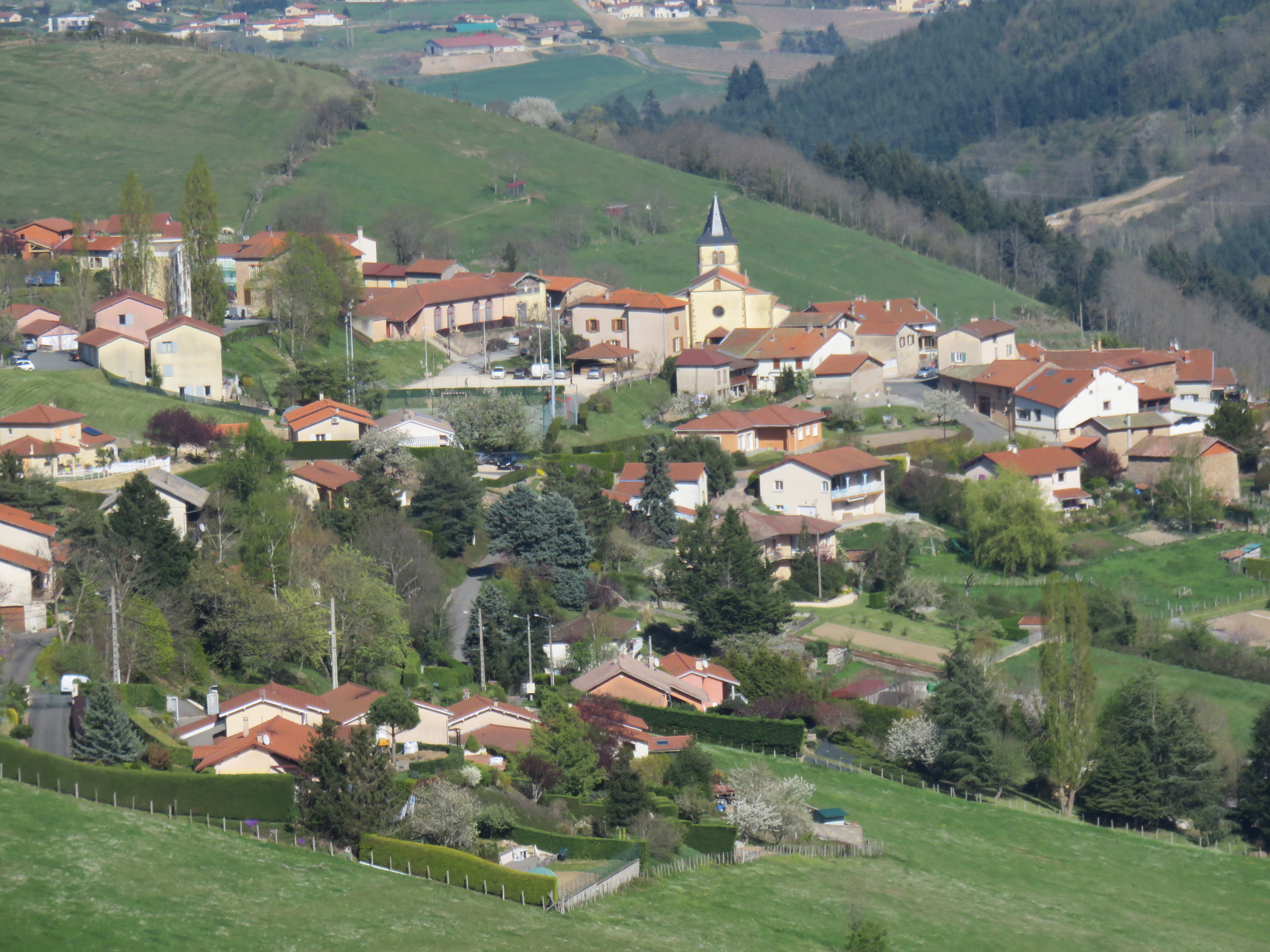
- Saint-Marcel-l'Éclairé in 2017.

- Coat of arms
- Location of Saint-Marcel-l'Éclairé
- Location within France Location within Auvergne-Rhône-Alpes
- Coordinates: 45°52′33″N 4°26′06″E
- Country: France
- Region: Auvergne-Rhône-Alpes
- Department: Rhône
- Arrondissement: Villefranche-sur-Saône
- Canton: Tarare
- Intercommunality: CA de l'Ouest Rhodanien

Government
  - Mayor (2026–32): Hervé Digas
- Area^{1}: 11.88 km^{2} (4.59 sq mi)
- Highest elevation: 843 m (2,766 ft)
- Lowest elevation: 360 m (1,180 ft)
- Population (2023): 575
  - Density: 48.4/km^{2} (125/sq mi)
- Time zone: UTC+01:00 (CET)
  - Summer (DST): UTC+02:00 (CEST)
- INSEE/Postal code: 69225 /69170
- ^{1} French Land Register data, which excludes lakes, ponds, glaciers > 1 km^{2} (0.386 sq mi or 247 acres) and river estuaries.

Saint-Marcel-l'Éclairé (French pronunciation: [sɛ̃ maʁsɛl leklɛʁe]) is a commune in the Rhône department in eastern France.

== See also ==
- Communes of the Rhône department
