= Valsonne =

- Commune
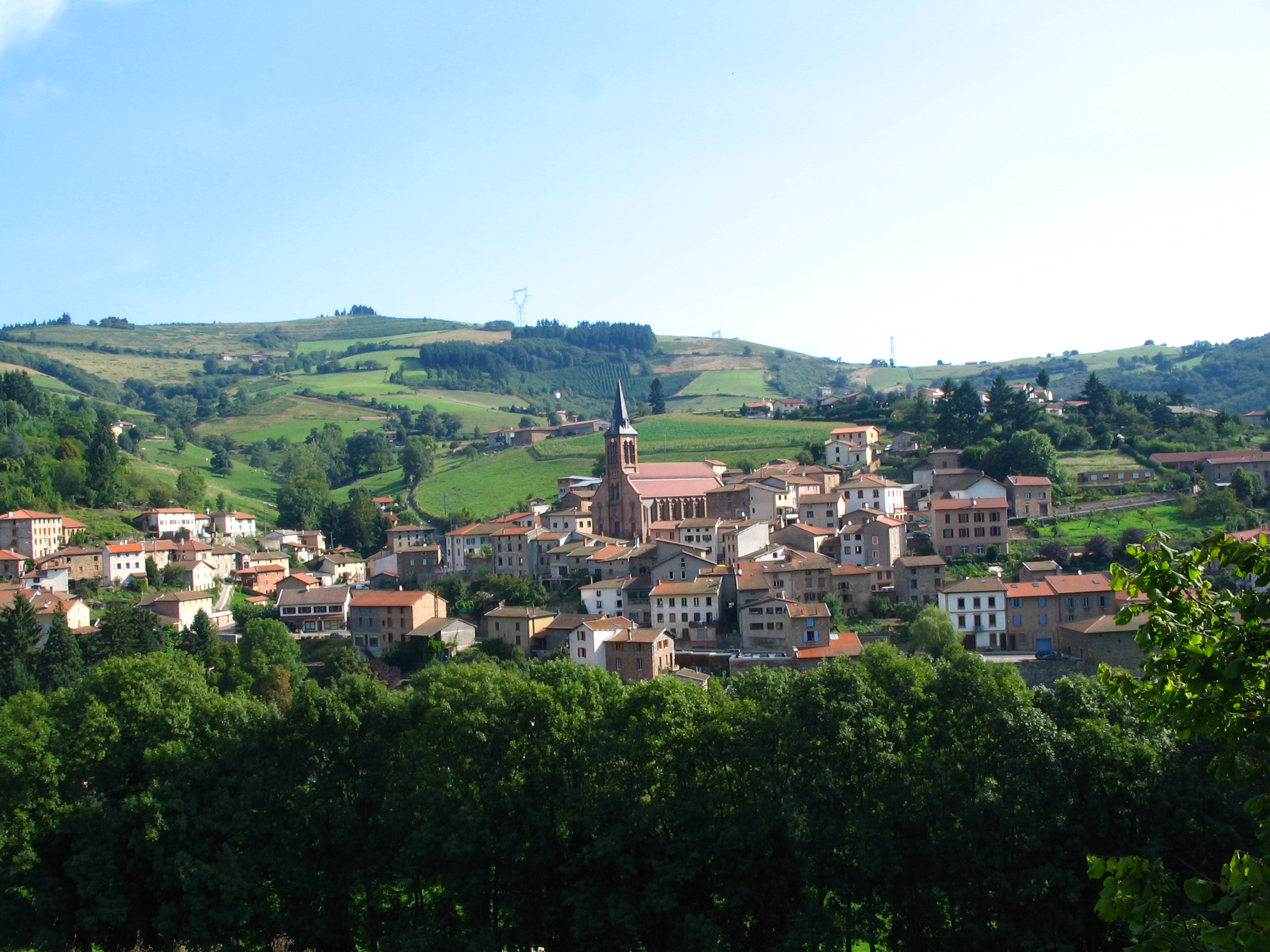
- View of Valsonne
- Location of Valsonne
- Location within France Location within Auvergne-Rhône-Alpes
- Coordinates: 45°56′50″N 4°25′50″E
- Country: France
- Region: Auvergne-Rhône-Alpes
- Department: Rhône
- Arrondissement: Villefranche-sur-Saône
- Canton: Tarare
- Intercommunality: CA de l'Ouest Rhodanien

Government
  - Mayor (2020–2026): Patrick Bourrassaut
- Area^{1}: 18.25 km^{2} (7.05 sq mi)
- Elevation: 460 m (1,510 ft)
- Highest elevation: 866 m (2,841 ft)
- Lowest elevation: 413 m (1,355 ft)
- Population (2023): 1,005
  - Density: 55.07/km^{2} (142.6/sq mi)
- Time zone: UTC+01:00 (CET)
  - Summer (DST): UTC+02:00 (CEST)
- INSEE/Postal code: 69254 /69170
- ^{1} French Land Register data, which excludes lakes, ponds, glaciers > 1 km^{2} (0.386 sq mi or 247 acres) and river estuaries.

Valsonne (French pronunciation: [valsɔn]) is a commune in the Rhône department in eastern France.

== Demography ==
Historical population
Year	Pop.	±% p.a.
1968	505	—
1975	449	−1.67%
1982	510	+1.84%
1990	600	+2.05%
1999	714	+1.95%
2007	820	+1.75%
2012	889	+1.63%
2017	952	+1.38%
2023	1,005	+0.91%
Source: INSEE

== See also ==
- Communes of the Rhône department
