= Tarare =

- Commune
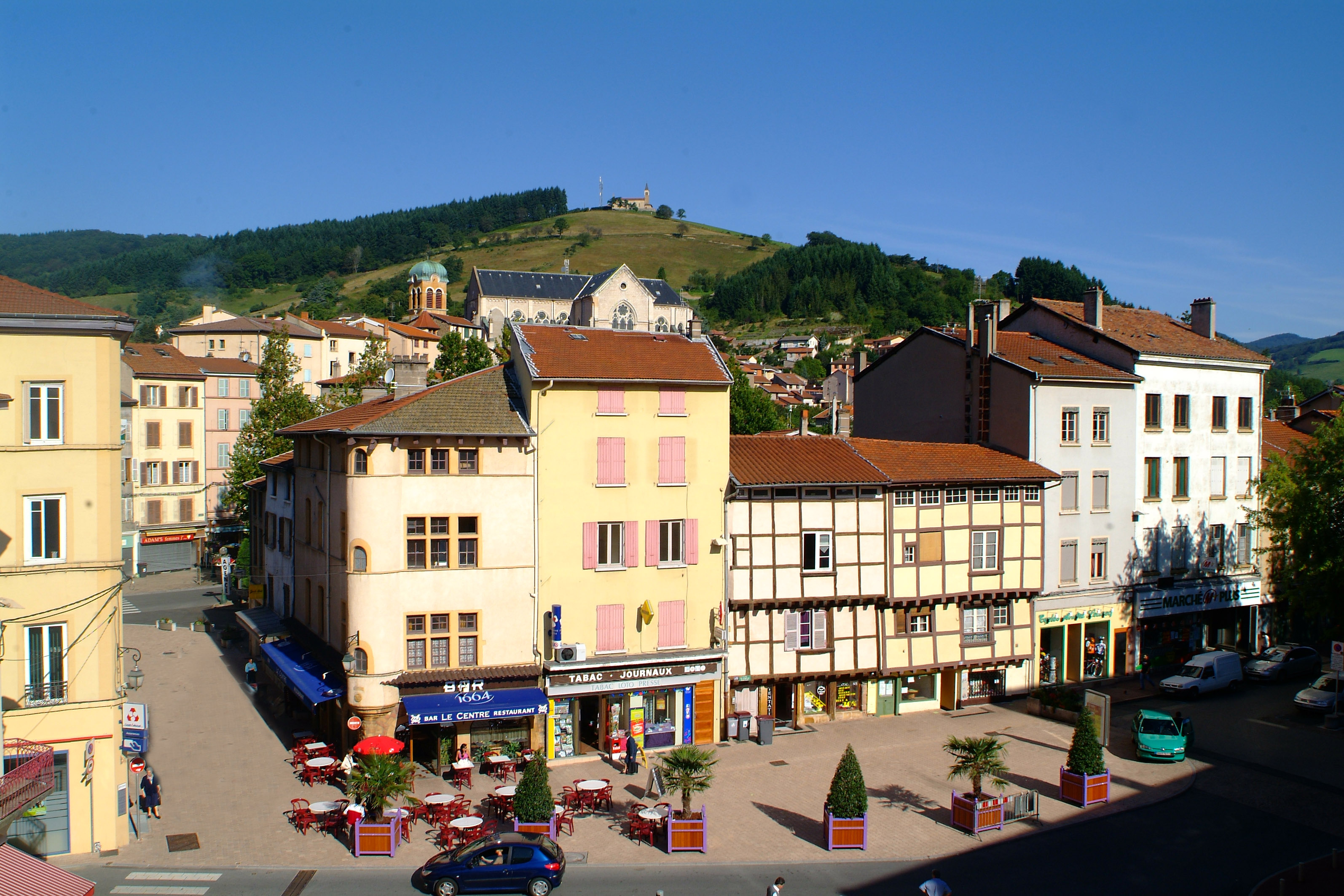
- Tarare town centre

- Coat of arms
- Location of Tarare
- Location within France Location within Auvergne-Rhône-Alpes
- Coordinates: 45°53′49″N 4°26′02″E
- Country: France
- Region: Auvergne-Rhône-Alpes
- Department: Rhône
- Arrondissement: Villefranche-sur-Saône
- Canton: Tarare
- Intercommunality: CA de l'Ouest Rhodanien

Government
  - Mayor (2026–2032): Bruno Peylachon
- Area^{1}: 13.99 km^{2} (5.40 sq mi)
- Elevation: 420 m (1,380 ft)
- Highest elevation: 000 m (0 ft)
- Lowest elevation: 069 m (226 ft)
- Population (2023): 10,893
  - Density: 778.6/km^{2} (2,017/sq mi)
- Demonym(s): Tarariens, Tararienne
- Time zone: UTC+01:00 (CET)
  - Summer (DST): UTC+02:00 (CEST)
- INSEE/Postal code: 69243 /69170
- ^{1} French Land Register data, which excludes lakes, ponds, glaciers > 1 km^{2} (0.386 sq mi or 247 acres) and river estuaries.

Tarare is a commune in the Rhône department in eastern France. It lies on the Turdine river, 28 miles west-northwest of Lyon by rail.

== History ==
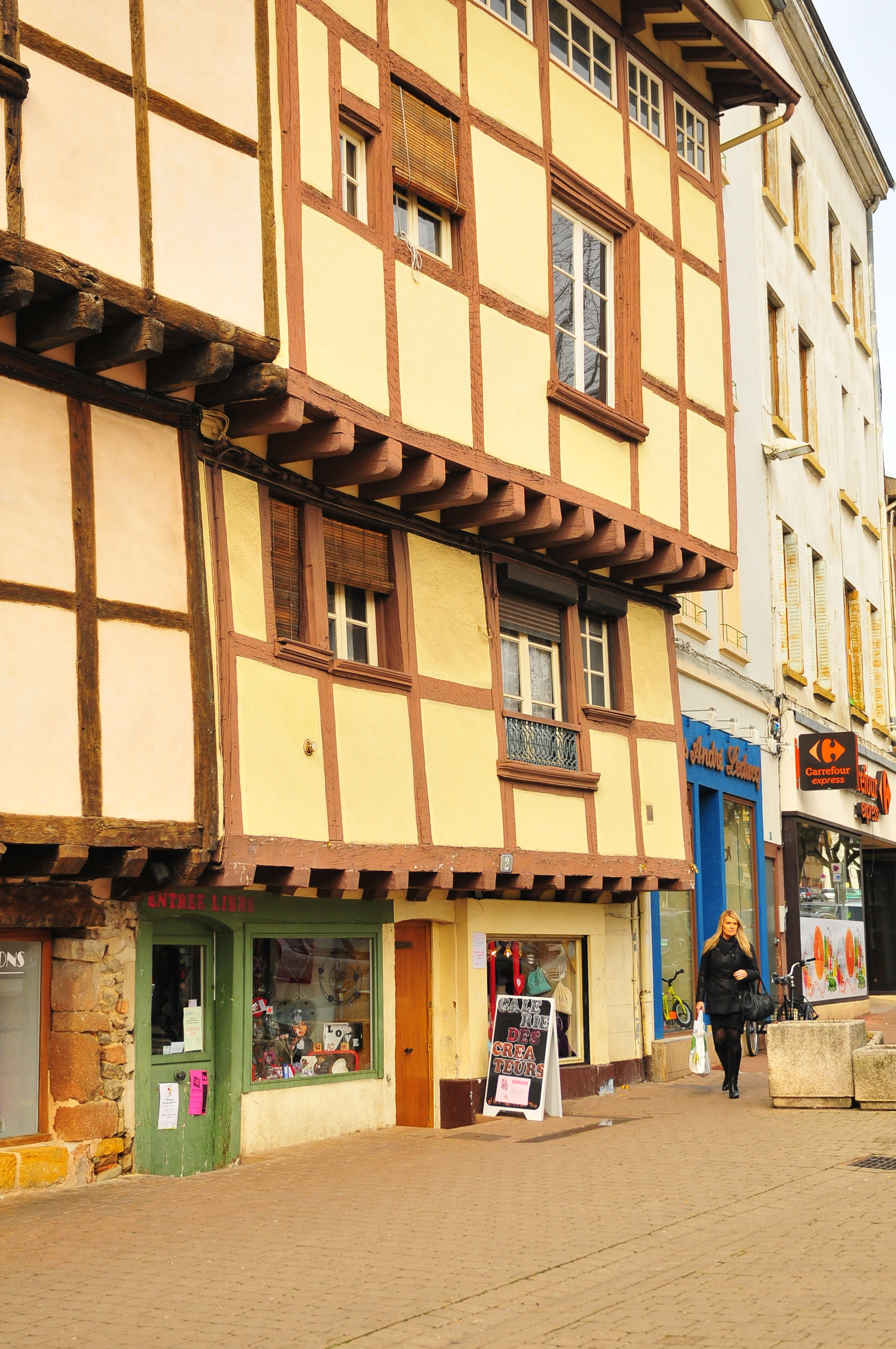
House in the Market Place

The city was founded at the beginning of the 12th century, as the priory of Tarare by the Savigny Abbey. Only weavers, shoemakers and tanners lived there, in addition to a few merchants and innkeepers. In the 16th century, plagues decimated the population to the point that the consulate of Lyon initiated a special quest to aid the people in Tarare.

In the 1850s, silk mills at Tarare were taking on unmarried young women aged between thirteen and fifteen as apprentices. The girls had to provide birth certificates and proof of vaccination. As well as getting wages, they had their board and lodging, so that they worked away from home. There was a 12-hour working day, and the girls were taught reading, writing, and arithmetic. After a three-year apprenticeship, they could continue to work at the mill.

In 1874, C. B. Black's Guide to France, Belgium, Holland, &c said of Tarare:

“A manufacturing town (pop. 16,000), on the Tardine. Hotels: Europe; Commerce. Famous in France for the manufacture of muslins. Silks and merinoes are also made here.”

A now archaic description of the early 20th-century economy is provided by the Encyclopædia Britannica Eleventh Edition:

Tarare is the centre of a region engaged in the production of muslins, tarletans, embroidery and silk-plush, and in printing, bleaching and other subsidiary processes. Till 1756, when the manufacture of muslins was introduced from Switzerland, the town lay unknown among the Beaujolais mountains. The manufacture of Swiss cotton yarns and crochet embroideries was introduced at the end of the 18th century; at the beginning of the 19th figured stuffs, openworks and zephyrs were first produced. The manufacture of silk-plush for hats and machine-made velvets was set up towards the end of the 19th century. A busy trade is carried on in corn, cattle, linen, hemp, thread and leather.

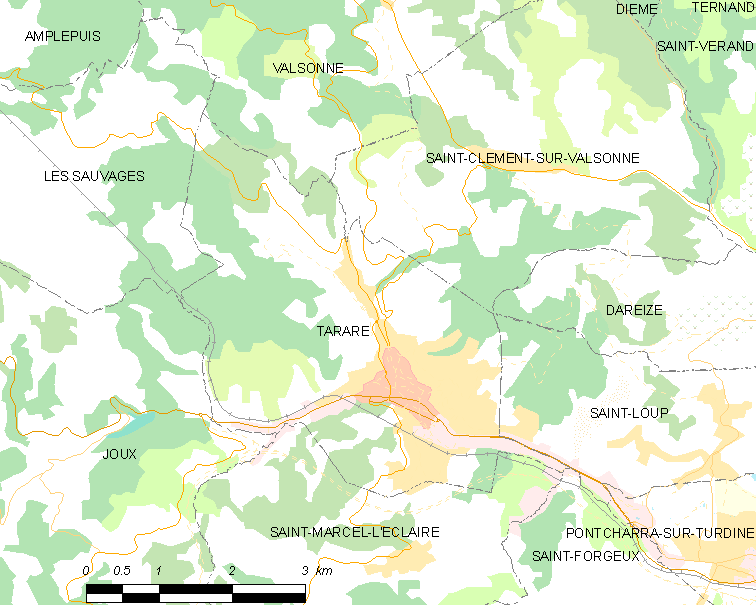
Map of nearby villages

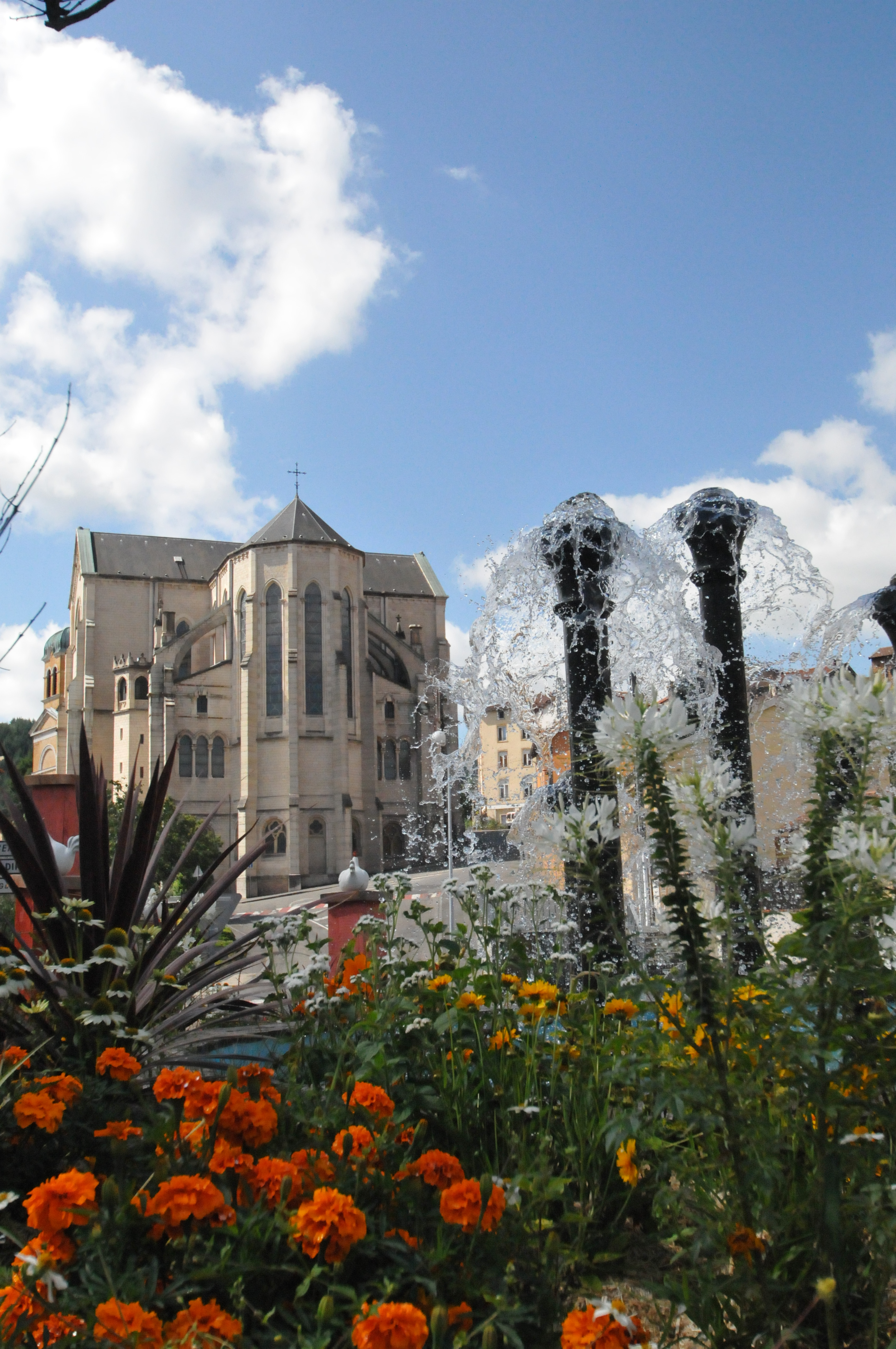
Parish church, Tarare

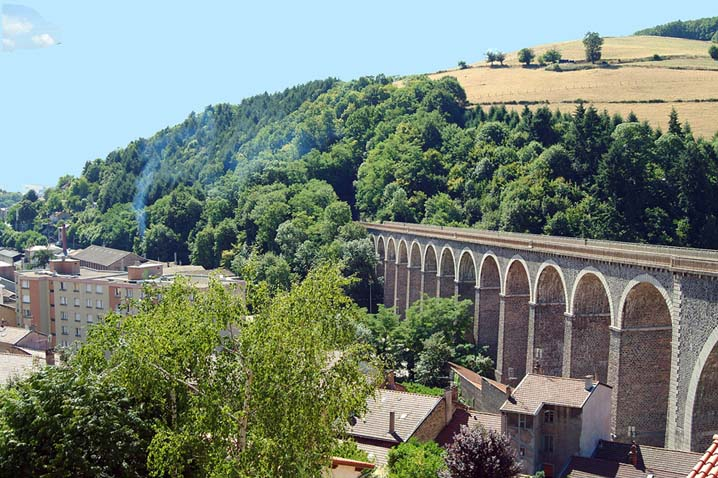
Viaduct at the edge of town

== Population ==
Historical population
Year	Pop.	±% p.a.
1968	12,296	—
1975	12,045	−0.29%
1982	10,822	−1.52%
1990	10,720	−0.12%
1999	10,420	−0.31%
2007	10,677	+0.31%
2012	10,401	−0.52%
2017	10,582	+0.35%
2023	10,893	+0.48%
Source: INSEE

== Notable people ==
- Jean-Baptiste Vietty, sculptor
- Louis Sonnery-Martin, politician
- Antoine Deflotrière, cyclist
- Jean Jourlin, wrestler
- Roger-Arnould Rivière, poet
- David Christie, singer
- Anne-Laure Casseleux, footballer
- Corentin Tolisso, footballer
- Georges-Antoine Simonet, creator of the muslins

== See also ==
- Communes of the Rhône department
- Villefranche - Tarare Airport
