= Canton of Tarare =

Coordinates: 45.8961°N 4.4563°E

Tarare
- Canton
- Country: France
- Region: Auvergne-Rhône-Alpes
- Department: Rhône
- No. of communes: {{{nbcomm}}}
- Area: 269.25 km^{2} (103.96 sq mi)
- Population (2023): 29,640
  - Density: 110.1/km^{2} (285.1/sq mi)
- INSEE code: 6910

The Canton of Tarare is a French administrative division, located in the Rhône department.

The canton was established in 1790 and modified by decree of 27 February 2014 which came into force in March 2015.

== Composition ==
The canton of Tarare is composed of 18 communes:

Communes	Population (2012)
Affoux	340
Ancy	597
Chambost-Allières	782
Dième	202
Grandris	1,164
Joux	650
Lamure-sur-Azergues	1,035
Les Sauvages	656
Saint-Appolinaire	181
Saint-Clément-sur-Valsonne	780
Saint-Forgeux	1,468
Saint-Just-d'Avray	755
Saint-Marcel-l'Éclairé	523
Saint-Romain-de-Popey	1,430
Sarcey	941
Tarare	10,401
Valsonne	889
Vindry-sur-Turdine	4,728

== See also ==
- Cantons of the Rhône department
- Communes of the Rhône department
