= Canton of Givors =

Coordinates: 45°35′37″N 4°44′01″E

Givors
- Former canton
- Interactive map of Givors
- Country: France
- Region: Auvergne-Rhône-Alpes
- Department: Rhône
- No. of communes: {{{nbcomm}}}
- Disbanded: 2015
- Area: 90.46 km^{2} (34.93 sq mi)
- Population (2012): 40,828
  - Density: 451.3/km^{2} (1,169/sq mi)

The Canton of Givors is a French former administrative division. It was disbanded at the creation of the Metropolis of Lyon in January 2015. It was located in the arrondissement of Lyon, in the Rhône département (Rhône-Alpes région). It had 40,828 inhabitants in 2012.

== Composition ==
The canton comprised the following communes:

- Chassagny
- Échalas
- Givors
- Grigny
- Millery
- Montagny
- Saint-Andéol-le-Château
- Saint-Jean-de-Touslas
- Saint-Romain-en-Gier

== See also ==
- Cantons of the Rhône department
- Communes of the Rhône department
