= Saint-Laurent-de-Vaux =

- Part of Vaugneray
- Location of Saint-Laurent-de-Vaux
- Location within France Location within Auvergne-Rhône-Alpes
- Coordinates: 45°42′56″N 4°37′57″E
- Country: France
- Region: Auvergne-Rhône-Alpes
- Department: Rhône
- Arrondissement: Lyon
- Canton: Vaugneray
- Commune: Vaugneray
- Area^{1}: 2.64 km^{2} (1.02 sq mi)
- Elevation: 530 m (1,740 ft)
- Highest elevation: 660 m (2,170 ft)
- Lowest elevation: 370 m (1,210 ft)
- Population (2019): 282
  - Density: 107/km^{2} (277/sq mi)
- Time zone: UTC+01:00 (CET)
  - Summer (DST): UTC+02:00 (CEST)
- Postal code: 69670
- ^{1} French Land Register data, which excludes lakes, ponds, glaciers > 1 km^{2} (0.386 sq mi or 247 acres) and river estuaries.

Saint-Laurent-de-Vaux (French pronunciation: [sɛ̃ loʁɑ̃ də vo]) is a former commune in the Rhône department in eastern France. It was annexed by the commune of Vaugneray on 1 January 2015.
