= Canton of Vénissieux-Nord =

Coordinates: 45.6833°N 4.8833°E

Vénissieux-Nord
- Former canton
- Interactive map of Vénissieux-Nord
- Country: France
- Region: Auvergne-Rhône-Alpes
- Department: Rhône
- No. of communes: {{{nbcomm}}}
- Disbanded: 2015
- Area: 9.15 km^{2} (3.53 sq mi)
- Population (2012): 29,763
  - Density: 3,250/km^{2} (8,420/sq mi)

The Canton of Vénissieux-Nord is a French former administrative division. It was disbanded at the creation of the Metropolis of Lyon in January 2015. It was located in the arrondissement of Lyon, in the Rhône département (Rhône-Alpes région). It had 29,763 inhabitants in 2012. It comprised part of the commune of Vénissieux.

== See also ==
- Cantons of the Rhône department
- Communes of the Rhône department
