= Saint-Symphorien-sur-Coise =

- Commune
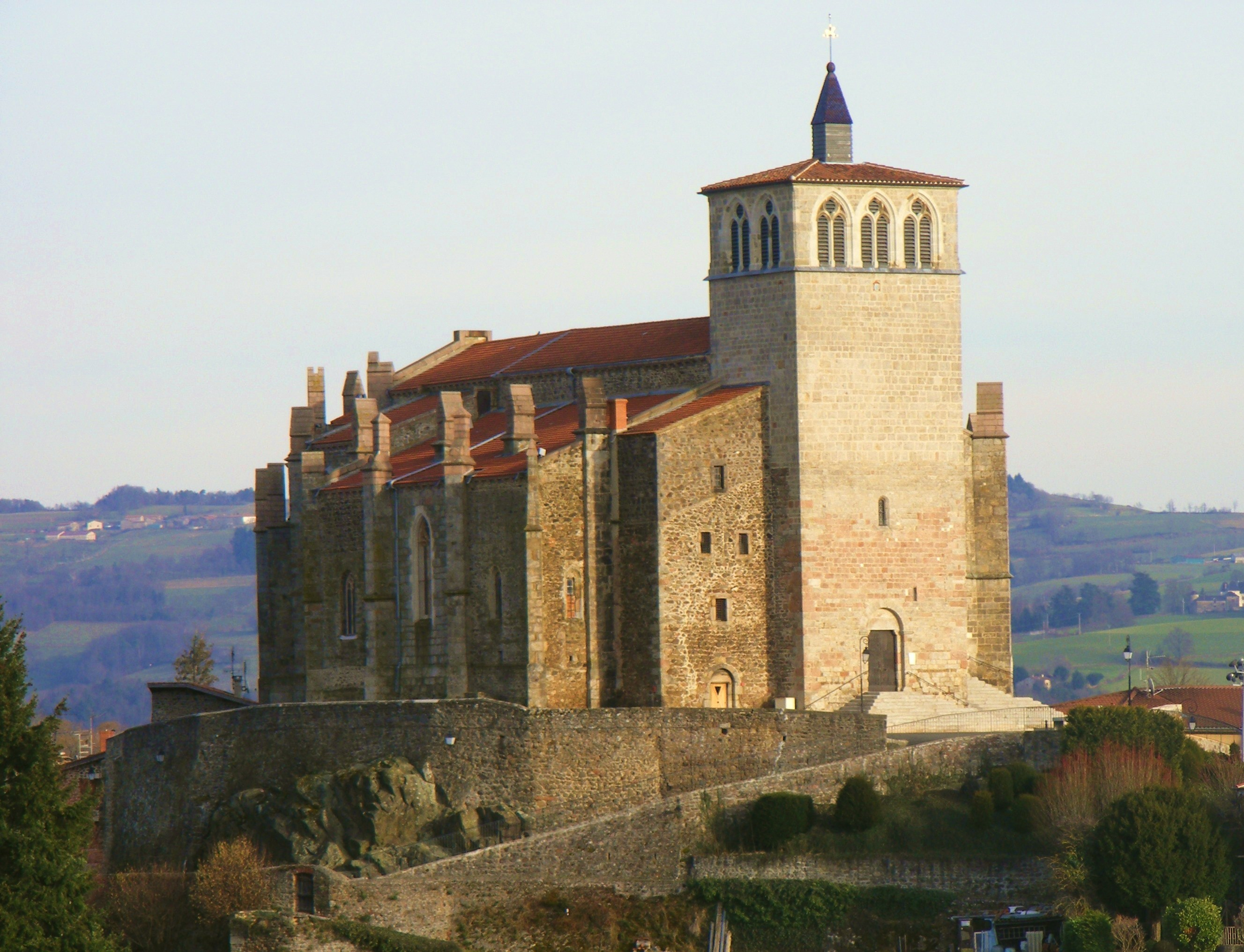
- A view of the church, from the north-west

- Coat of arms
- Location of Saint-Symphorien-sur-Coise
- Location within France Location within Auvergne-Rhône-Alpes
- Coordinates: 45°37′59″N 4°27′28″E
- Country: France
- Region: Auvergne-Rhône-Alpes
- Department: Rhône
- Arrondissement: Lyon
- Canton: Vaugneray
- Intercommunality: CC des Monts du Lyonnais

Government
  - Mayor (2020–2026): Jérôme Banino
- Area^{1}: 4.07 km^{2} (1.57 sq mi)
- Elevation: 580 m (1,900 ft)
- Highest elevation: 629 m (2,064 ft)
- Lowest elevation: 480 m (1,570 ft)
- Population (2023): 3,785
  - Density: 930/km^{2} (2,410/sq mi)
- Time zone: UTC+01:00 (CET)
  - Summer (DST): UTC+02:00 (CEST)
- INSEE/Postal code: 69238 /69590
- ^{1} French Land Register data, which excludes lakes, ponds, glaciers > 1 km^{2} (0.386 sq mi or 247 acres) and river estuaries.

Saint-Symphorien-sur-Coise (French pronunciation: [sɛ̃ sɛ̃fɔʁjɛ̃ syʁ kwaz]) is a commune in the Rhône department in eastern France.

== Population ==
Historical population
| Year | Pop. | ±% p.a. |
|---|---|---|
| 1968 | 3,063 | — |
| 1975 | 3,311 | +1.12% |
| 1982 | 3,225 | −0.38% |
| 1990 | 3,211 | −0.05% |
| 1999 | 3,069 | −0.50% |
| 2007 | 3,428 | +1.39% |
| 2012 | 3,522 | +0.54% |
| 2017 | 3,682 | +0.89% |
| 2023 | 3,785 | +0.46% |
Source: INSEE

== See also ==
- Communes of the Rhône department
