= Chassagny =

- Part of Beauvallon
- Coat of arms
- Location of Chassagny
- Location within France Location within Auvergne-Rhône-Alpes
- Coordinates: 45°36′26″N 4°43′58″E
- Country: France
- Region: Auvergne-Rhône-Alpes
- Department: Rhône
- Arrondissement: Lyon
- Canton: Saint-Symphorien-d'Ozon
- Commune: Beauvallon
- Area^{1}: 9.33 km^{2} (3.60 sq mi)
- Elevation: 300 m (980 ft)
- Highest elevation: 343 m (1,125 ft)
- Lowest elevation: 171 m (561 ft)
- Population (2022): 1,323
  - Density: 142/km^{2} (367/sq mi)
- Time zone: UTC+01:00 (CET)
  - Summer (DST): UTC+02:00 (CEST)
- Postal code: 69700
- ^{1} French Land Register data, which excludes lakes, ponds, glaciers > 1 km^{2} (0.386 sq mi or 247 acres) and river estuaries.

Chassagny (French pronunciation: [ʃasaɲi]) is a former commune in the Rhône department in eastern France. On 1 January 2018, it was merged into the new commune of Beauvallon.

== See also ==
Communes of the Rhône department
