= Grézieu-le-Marché =

- Commune
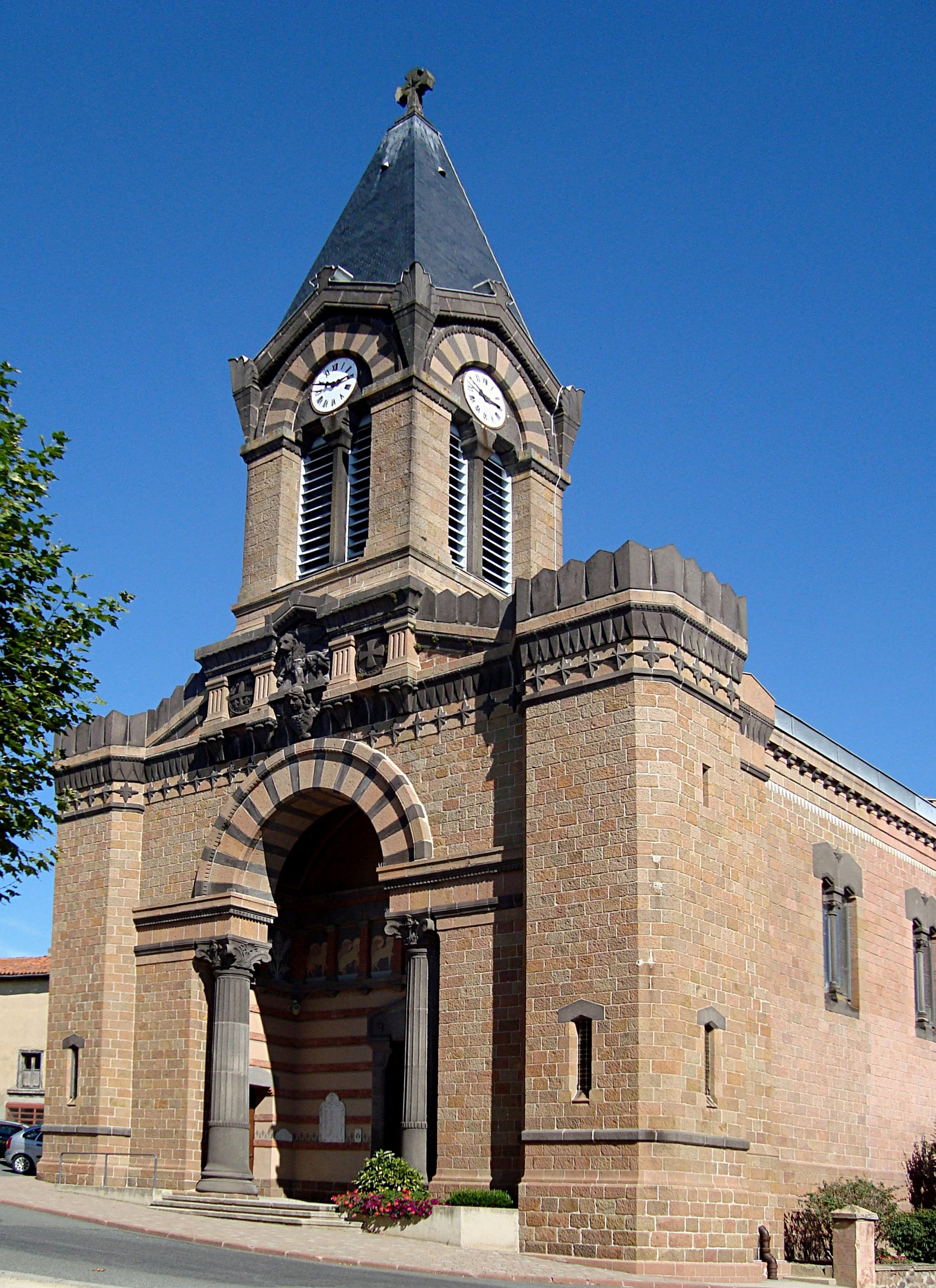
- The church in Grézieu-le-Marché
- Location of Grézieu-le-Marché
- Location within France Location within Auvergne-Rhône-Alpes
- Coordinates: 45°39′26″N 4°25′19″E
- Country: France
- Region: Auvergne-Rhône-Alpes
- Department: Rhône
- Arrondissement: Lyon
- Canton: Vaugneray
- Intercommunality: CC des Monts du Lyonnais

Government
  - Mayor (2020–2026): Didier Blanchard
- Area^{1}: 11.49 km^{2} (4.44 sq mi)
- Highest elevation: 733 m (2,405 ft)
- Lowest elevation: 438 m (1,437 ft)
- Population (2023): 834
  - Density: 72.6/km^{2} (188/sq mi)
- Time zone: UTC+01:00 (CET)
  - Summer (DST): UTC+02:00 (CEST)
- INSEE/Postal code: 69095 /69610
- ^{1} French Land Register data, which excludes lakes, ponds, glaciers > 1 km^{2} (0.386 sq mi or 247 acres) and river estuaries.

Grézieu-le-Marché is a commune in the Rhône department in eastern France.

== See also ==
- Communes of the Rhône department
