= Vaugneray =

- Commune
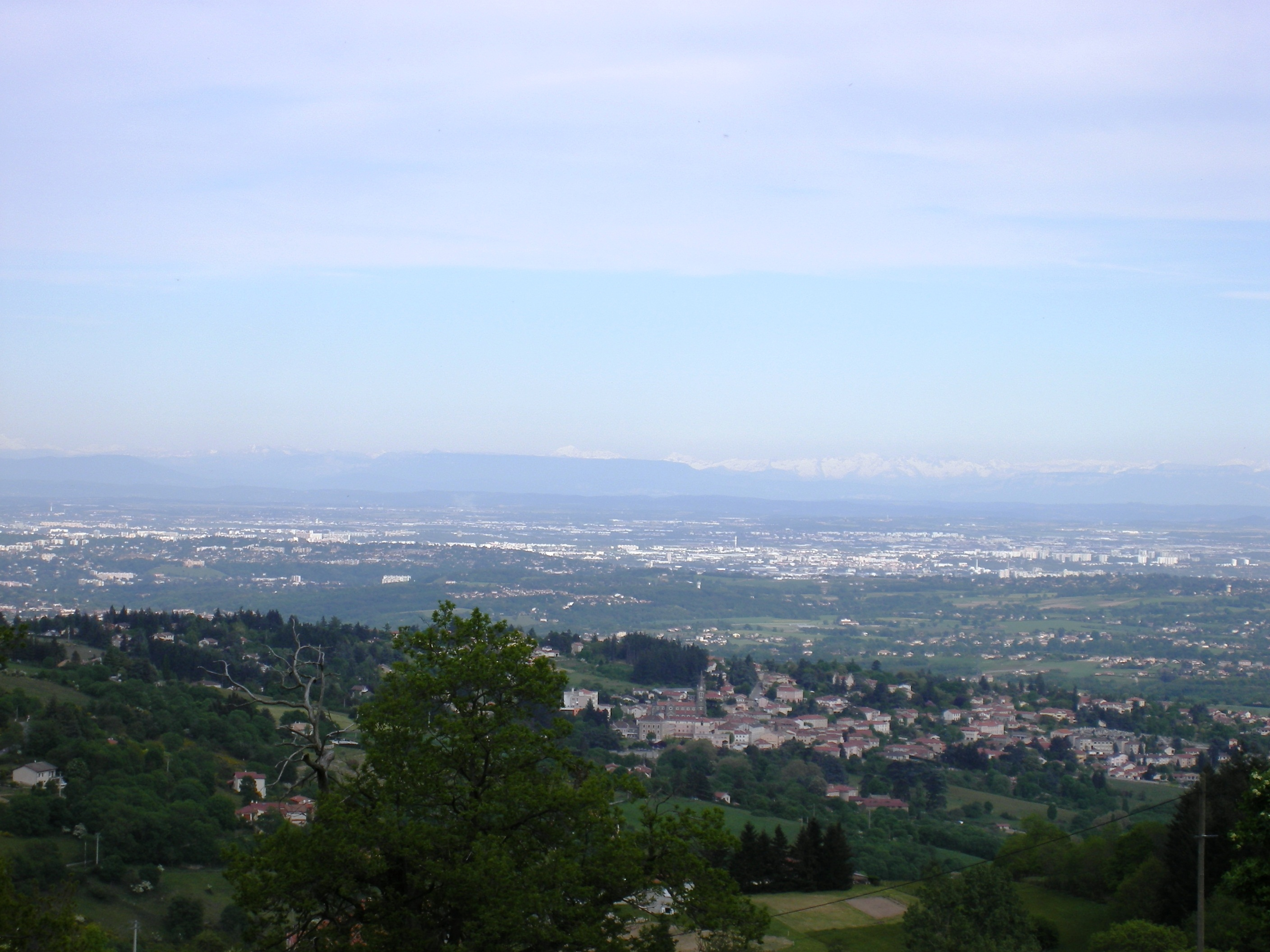
- The view, from the hills of Vaugneray, of Lyon and Mont Blanc

- Coat of arms
- Location of Vaugneray
- Location within France Location within Auvergne-Rhône-Alpes
- Coordinates: 45°44′18″N 4°39′26″E
- Country: France
- Region: Auvergne-Rhône-Alpes
- Department: Rhône
- Arrondissement: Lyon
- Canton: Vaugneray
- Intercommunality: CC Vallons du Lyonnais

Government
  - Mayor (2020–2026): Daniel Jullien
- Area^{1}: 25.02 km^{2} (9.66 sq mi)
- Highest elevation: 804 m (2,638 ft)
- Lowest elevation: 260 m (850 ft)
- Population (2023): 6,304
  - Density: 252.0/km^{2} (652.6/sq mi)
- Demonym(s): Valnégriennes, Valnégriens (sometimes Valnigrins, Valnigrines)
- Time zone: UTC+01:00 (CET)
  - Summer (DST): UTC+02:00 (CEST)
- INSEE/Postal code: 69255 /69670
- Website: www.vaugneray.com
- ^{1} French Land Register data, which excludes lakes, ponds, glaciers > 1 km^{2} (0.386 sq mi or 247 acres) and river estuaries.

Vaugneray (French pronunciation: [voɲʁɛ]) is a commune in the Rhône department in eastern France.

On 1 January 2015, Vaugneray annexed the neighboring commune of Saint-Laurent-de-Vaux. It is since 2014 twinned with the Romanian town of Dăbuleni.

== Population ==
The population data given in the table below refer to the commune in its geography as of January 2025.

Historical population
| Year | Pop. | ±% p.a. |
|---|---|---|
| 1968 | 2,578 | — |
| 1975 | 2,984 | +2.11% |
| 1982 | 3,346 | +1.65% |
| 1990 | 3,733 | +1.38% |
| 1999 | 4,390 | +1.82% |
| 2007 | 4,927 | +1.45% |
| 2012 | 5,195 | +1.06% |
| 2017 | 5,734 | +1.99% |
| 2023 | 6,304 | +1.59% |
Source: INSEE

== See also ==
- Communes of the Rhône department
