= Larajasse =

- Commune
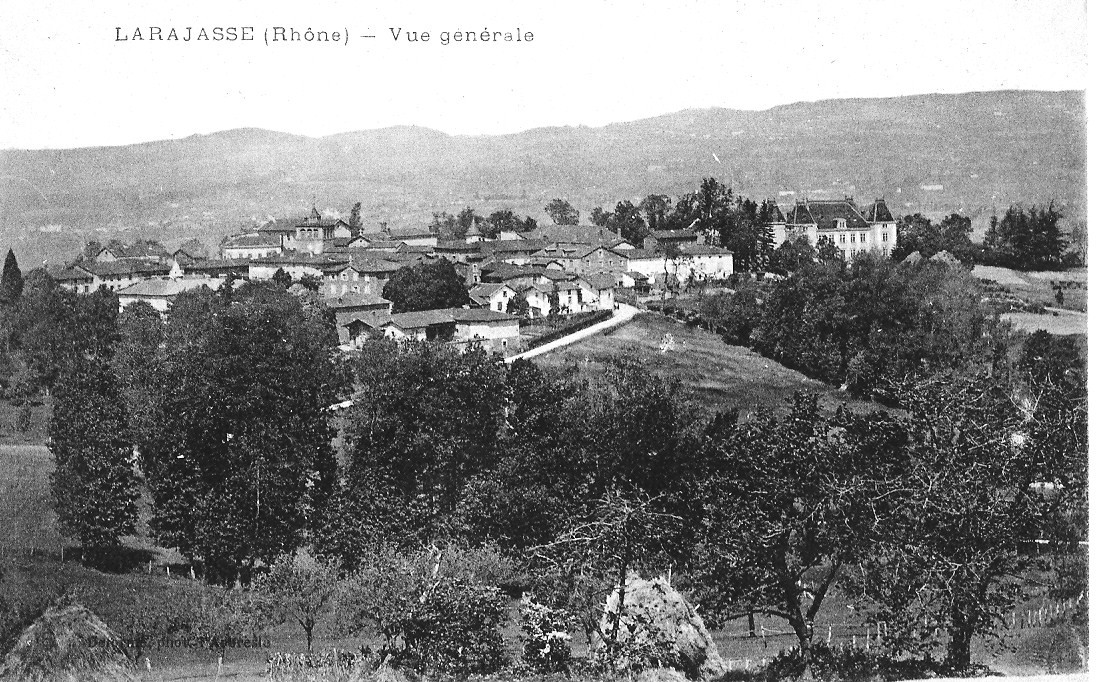
- A general view of Larajasse, at the beginning of the 20th century
- Location of Larajasse
- Location within France Location within Auvergne-Rhône-Alpes
- Coordinates: 45°36′53″N 4°30′07″E
- Country: France
- Region: Auvergne-Rhône-Alpes
- Department: Rhône
- Arrondissement: Lyon
- Canton: Vaugneray
- Intercommunality: CC des Monts du Lyonnais

Government
  - Mayor (2020–2026): Fabrice Bouchut
- Area^{1}: 33.61 km^{2} (12.98 sq mi)
- Elevation: 750 m (2,460 ft)
- Highest elevation: 940 m (3,080 ft)
- Lowest elevation: 509 m (1,670 ft)
- Population (2023): 1,804
  - Density: 53.67/km^{2} (139.0/sq mi)
- Time zone: UTC+01:00 (CET)
  - Summer (DST): UTC+02:00 (CEST)
- INSEE/Postal code: 69110 /69590
- ^{1} French Land Register data, which excludes lakes, ponds, glaciers > 1 km^{2} (0.386 sq mi or 247 acres) and river estuaries.

Larajasse (French pronunciation: [laʁaʒas]) is a commune in the Rhône department in eastern France.

== See also ==
- Communes of the Rhône department
