= Pollionnay =

- Commune
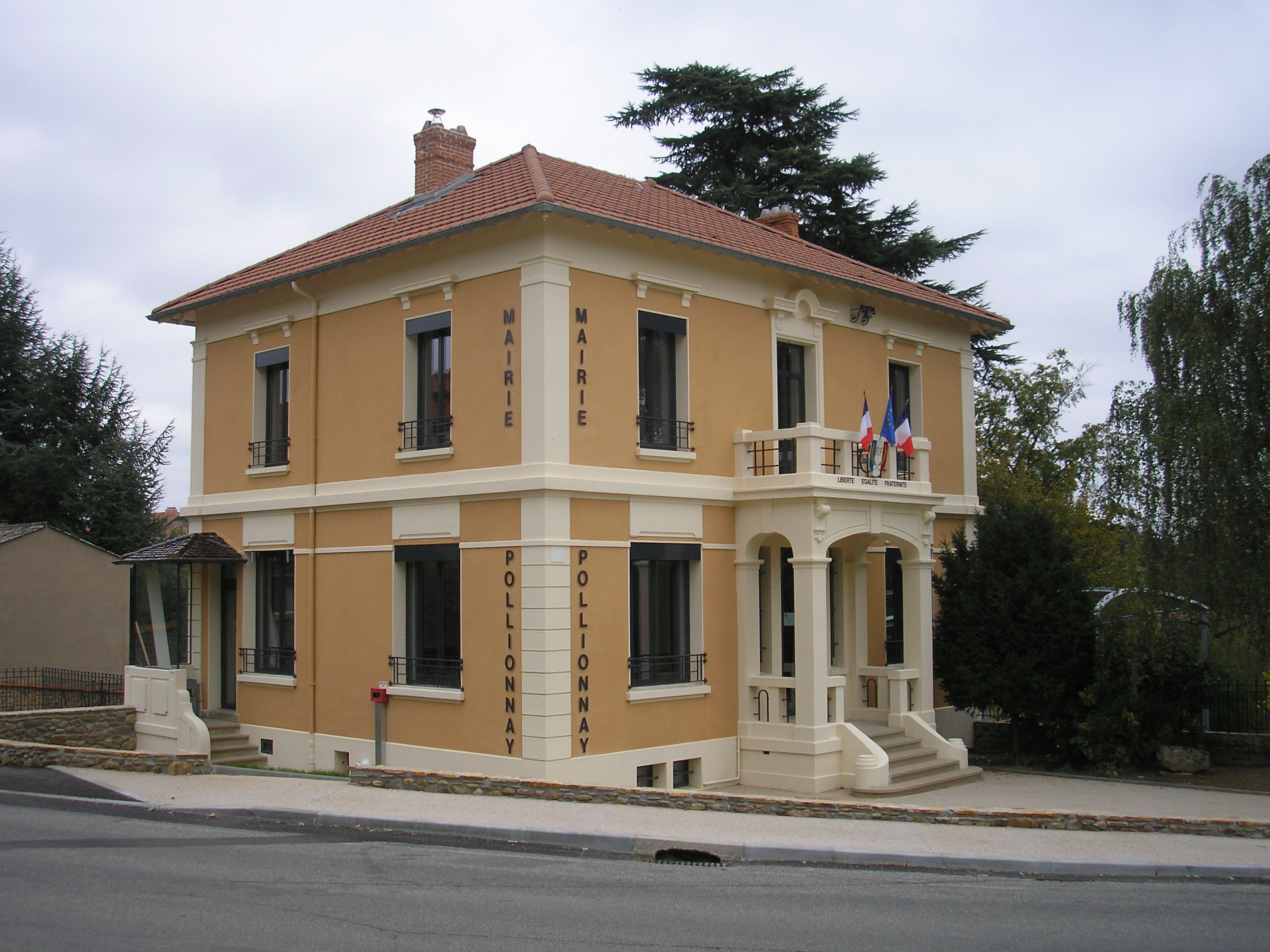
- The town hall of Pollionnay

- Coat of arms
- Location of Pollionnay
- Location within France Location within Auvergne-Rhône-Alpes
- Coordinates: 45°45′55″N 4°39′43″E
- Country: France
- Region: Auvergne-Rhône-Alpes
- Department: Rhône
- Arrondissement: Lyon
- Canton: Vaugneray
- Intercommunality: Vallons du Lyonnais

Government
  - Mayor (2020–2026): Philippe Tissot
- Area^{1}: 15.8 km^{2} (6.1 sq mi)
- Elevation: 420 m (1,380 ft)
- Highest elevation: 785 m (2,575 ft)
- Lowest elevation: 280 m (920 ft)
- Population (2023): 2,958
  - Density: 187/km^{2} (485/sq mi)
- Time zone: UTC+01:00 (CET)
  - Summer (DST): UTC+02:00 (CEST)
- INSEE/Postal code: 69154 /69290
- ^{1} French Land Register data, which excludes lakes, ponds, glaciers > 1 km^{2} (0.386 sq mi or 247 acres) and river estuaries.

Pollionnay (French pronunciation: [pɔljɔnɛ]) is a commune in the Rhône department in eastern France. The composer and organist Eugène Reuchsel (1900–1988) died in Pollionnay.

== Population ==
Historical population
Year	Pop.	±% p.a.
1968	676	—
1975	866	+3.60%
1982	1,088	+3.31%
1990	1,262	+1.87%
1999	1,580	+2.53%
2007	1,858	+2.05%
2012	2,151	+2.97%
2017	2,637	+4.16%
2023	2,958	+1.93%
Source: INSEE

== See also ==
- Communes of the Rhône department
