= Canton of Villefranche-sur-Saône =

Coordinates: 45.9833°N 4.7167°E

Villefranche-sur-Saône
- Canton
- Country: France
- Region: Auvergne-Rhône-Alpes
- Department: Rhône
- No. of communes: {{{nbcomm}}}
- Area: 9.48 km^{2} (3.66 sq mi)
- Population (2023): 36,172
  - Density: 3,820/km^{2} (9,880/sq mi)
- INSEE code: 6913

The Canton of Villefranche-sur-Saône is a French administrative division, located in the Rhône department.

The canton was established in 1790 and modified by decree of 28 February 2000 which came into force in March 2001.

== Composition ==
The canton of Villefranche-sur-Saône is composed of 1 commune:

Commune	Population (2012)
Villefranche-sur-Saône	36,241

== See also ==
- Cantons of the Rhône department
- Communes of the Rhône department
