= Yzeron =

- Commune
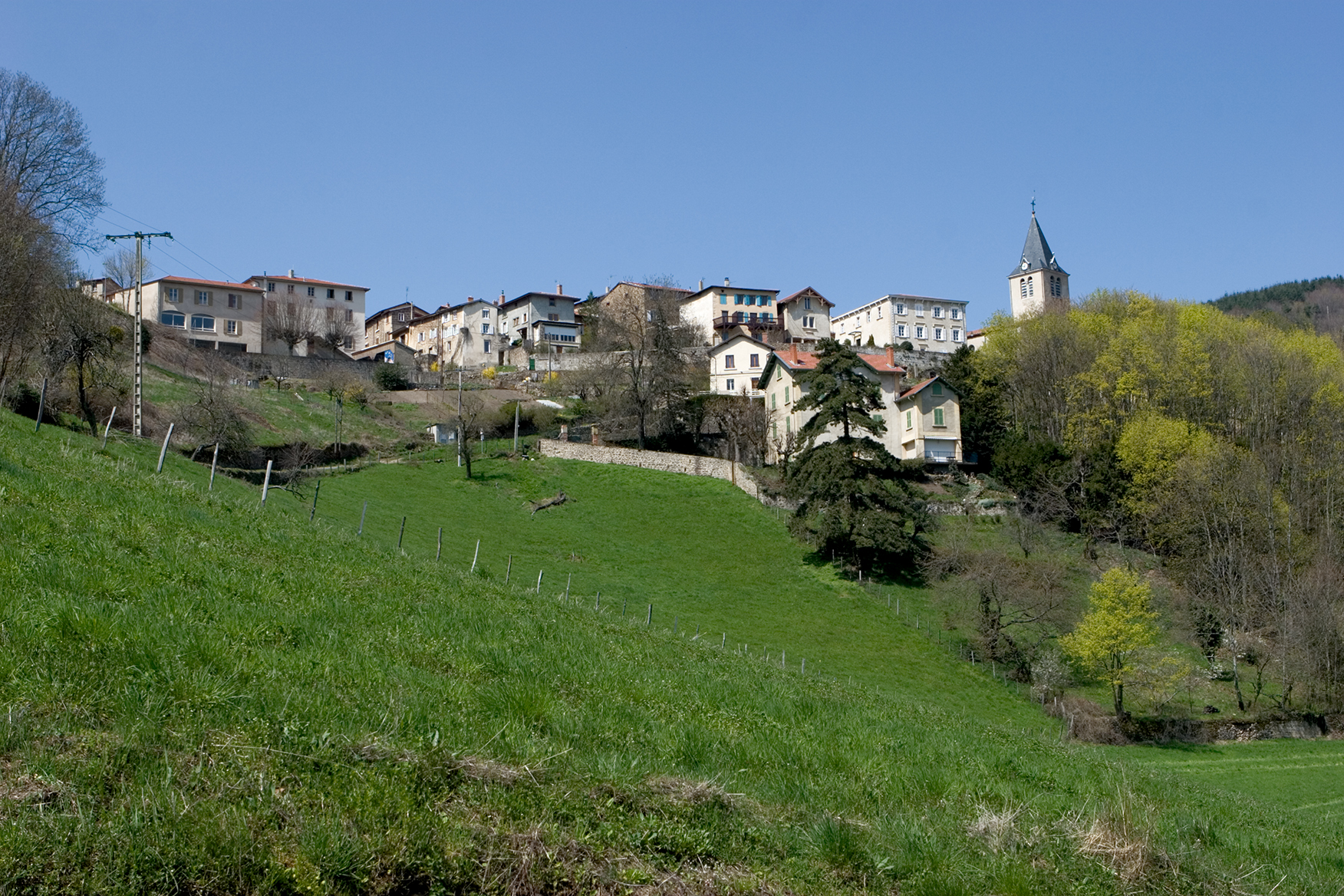
- A general view of Yzeron

- Coat of arms
- Location of Yzeron
- Location within France Location within Auvergne-Rhône-Alpes
- Coordinates: 45°42′32″N 4°35′30″E
- Country: France
- Region: Auvergne-Rhône-Alpes
- Department: Rhône
- Arrondissement: Lyon
- Canton: Vaugneray
- Intercommunality: Vallons du Lyonnais

Government
  - Mayor (2020–2026): Agnès Nelias
- Area^{1}: 10.75 km^{2} (4.15 sq mi)
- Elevation: 750 m (2,460 ft)
- Highest elevation: 892 m (2,927 ft)
- Lowest elevation: 448 m (1,470 ft)
- Population (2023): 995
  - Density: 92.6/km^{2} (240/sq mi)
- Demonym(s): Yzeronnais, Yzeronnaises
- Time zone: UTC+01:00 (CET)
  - Summer (DST): UTC+02:00 (CEST)
- INSEE/Postal code: 69269 /69510
- ^{1} French Land Register data, which excludes lakes, ponds, glaciers > 1 km^{2} (0.386 sq mi or 247 acres) and river estuaries.

Yzeron is a commune in the Rhône department in eastern France.

== Population ==
Historical population

Year	Pop.	±% p.a.
1793	500	—
1800	446	−1.62%
1806	605	+5.21%
1821	551	−0.62%
1831	603	+0.91%
1836	586	−0.57%
1841	570	−0.55%
1846	576	+0.21%
1851	592	+0.55%
1856	776	+5.56%
1861	1,262	+10.21%
1866	802	−8.67%
1872	725	−1.67%
1876	744	+0.65%
1881	713	−0.85%
1886	755	+1.15%
1891	734	−0.56%
1896	727	−0.19%
1901	697	−0.84%

Year	Pop.	±% p.a.
1906	679	−0.52%
1911	650	−0.87%
1921	572	−1.27%
1926	525	−1.70%
1931	545	+0.75%
1936	555	+0.36%
1946	550	−0.09%
1954	532	−0.42%
1962	500	−0.77%
1968	505	+0.17%
1975	483	−0.63%
1982	560	+2.14%
1990	675	+2.36%
1999	769	+1.46%
2007	984	+3.13%
2012	1,022	+0.76%
2017	1,022	+0.00%
2023	995	−0.45%

Source: EHESS (1793–1999) and INSEE

== See also ==
- Communes of the Rhône department
