= Saint-Martin-en-Haut =

- Commune
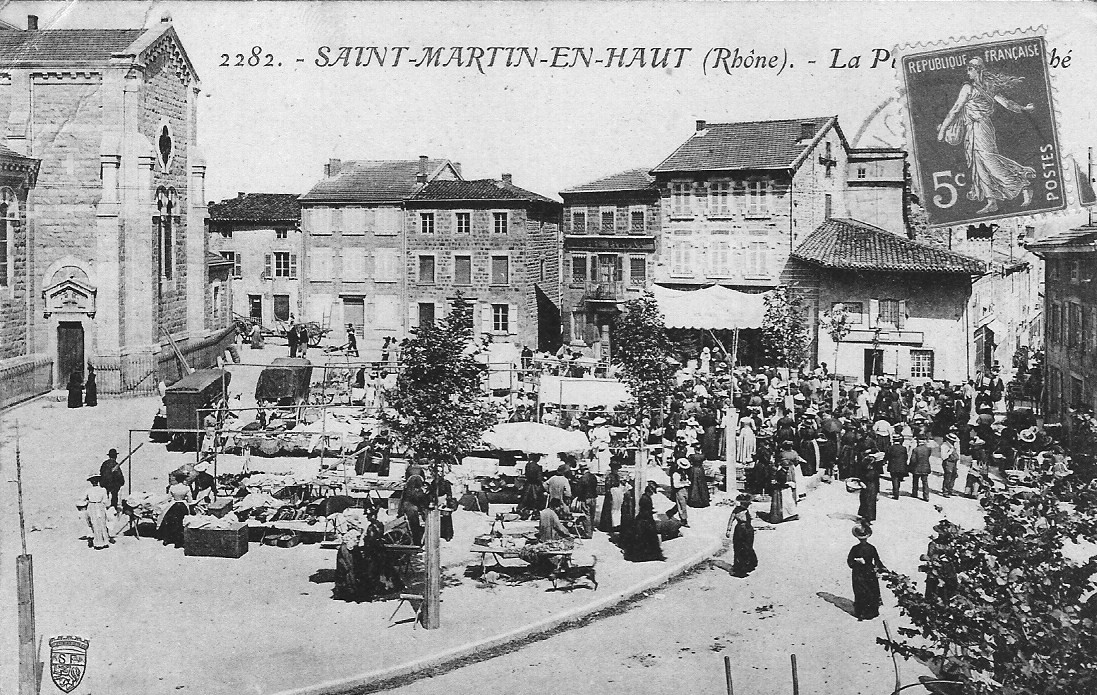
- The marketplace in Saint-Martin-en-Haut, in the early 20th century
- Location of Saint-Martin-en-Haut
- Location within France Location within Auvergne-Rhône-Alpes
- Coordinates: 45°39′38″N 4°33′45″E
- Country: France
- Region: Auvergne-Rhône-Alpes
- Department: Rhône
- Arrondissement: Lyon
- Canton: Vaugneray
- Intercommunality: CC des Monts du Lyonnais

Government
  - Mayor (2020–2026): Régis Chambe
- Area^{1}: 38.64 km^{2} (14.92 sq mi)
- Elevation: 730 m (2,400 ft)
- Highest elevation: 911 m (2,989 ft)
- Lowest elevation: 453 m (1,486 ft)
- Population (2023): 3,942
  - Density: 102.0/km^{2} (264.2/sq mi)
- Time zone: UTC+01:00 (CET)
  - Summer (DST): UTC+02:00 (CEST)
- INSEE/Postal code: 69227 /69850
- ^{1} French Land Register data, which excludes lakes, ponds, glaciers > 1 km^{2} (0.386 sq mi or 247 acres) and river estuaries.

Saint-Martin-en-Haut (Arpitan: Sant-Martin-d’en-Hôt) is a commune in the Rhône department in eastern France.

== Population ==
Historical population
Year	Pop.	±% p.a.
1968	2,518	—
1975	2,538	+0.11%
1982	2,893	+1.89%
1990	3,081	+0.79%
1999	3,429	+1.20%
2007	3,889	+1.59%
2012	3,847	−0.22%
2017	3,865	+0.09%
2023	3,942	+0.33%
Source: INSEE

== See also ==
- Communes of the Rhône department
