= Beauvallon, Rhône =

Beauvallon
- Commune
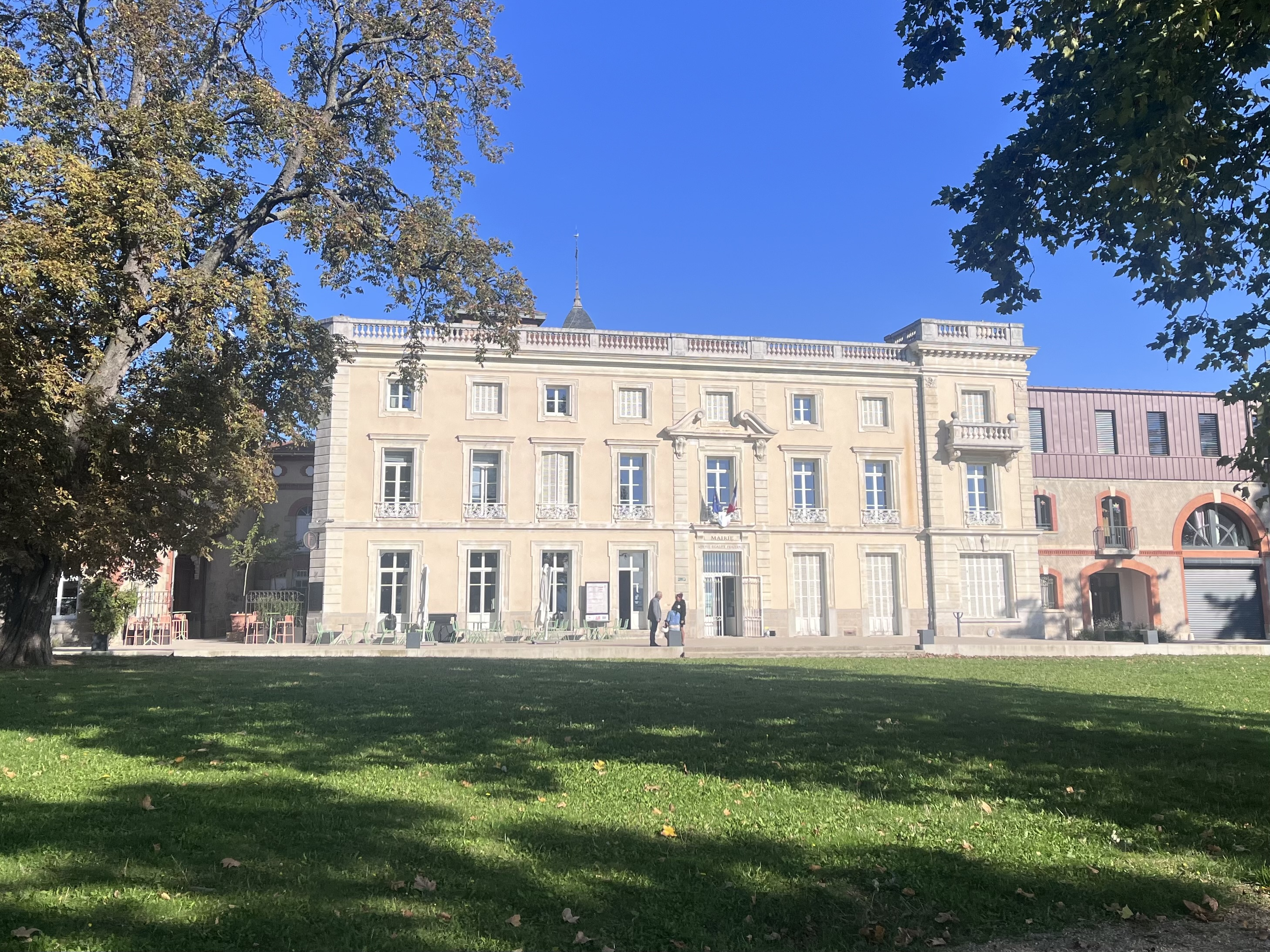
- Parc du Clos Souchon
- Location of Beauvallon
- Location within France Location within Auvergne-Rhône-Alpes
- Coordinates: 45°35′12″N 4°41′45″E
- Country: France
- Region: Auvergne-Rhône-Alpes
- Department: Rhône
- Arrondissement: Lyon
- Canton: Mornant
- Intercommunality: CC du Pays Mornantais

Government
  - Mayor (2020–2026): Yves Gougne
- Area^{1}: 24.85 km^{2} (9.59 sq mi)
- Population (2023): 4,260
  - Density: 171/km^{2} (444/sq mi)
- Time zone: UTC+01:00 (CET)
  - Summer (DST): UTC+02:00 (CEST)
- INSEE/Postal code: 69179 /69700
- Website: www.beauvallon69.fr
- ^{1} French Land Register data, which excludes lakes, ponds, glaciers > 1 km^{2} (0.386 sq mi or 247 acres) and river estuaries.

Beauvallon (French pronunciation: [bovalɔ̃]) is a rural commune in the Rhône department, central-eastern France. It is just west of the city of Givors, on the border with the Metropolis of Lyon.

== History ==
The commune was established on 1 January 2018 by merger of the former communes of Saint-Andéol-le-Château (the seat), Chassagny and Saint-Jean-de-Touslas.

== Population ==
Population data refer to the area corresponding with the commune as of January 2025.

Historical population
Year	Pop.	±% p.a.
1968	1,286	—
1975	1,546	+2.67%
1982	1,868	+2.74%
1990	2,456	+3.48%
1999	3,059	+2.47%
2007	3,451	+1.52%
2012	3,757	+1.71%
2017	4,013	+1.33%
2023	4,260	+1.00%
Source: INSEE

== See also ==
- Communes of the Rhône department
