= Saint-André-la-Côte =

- Commune
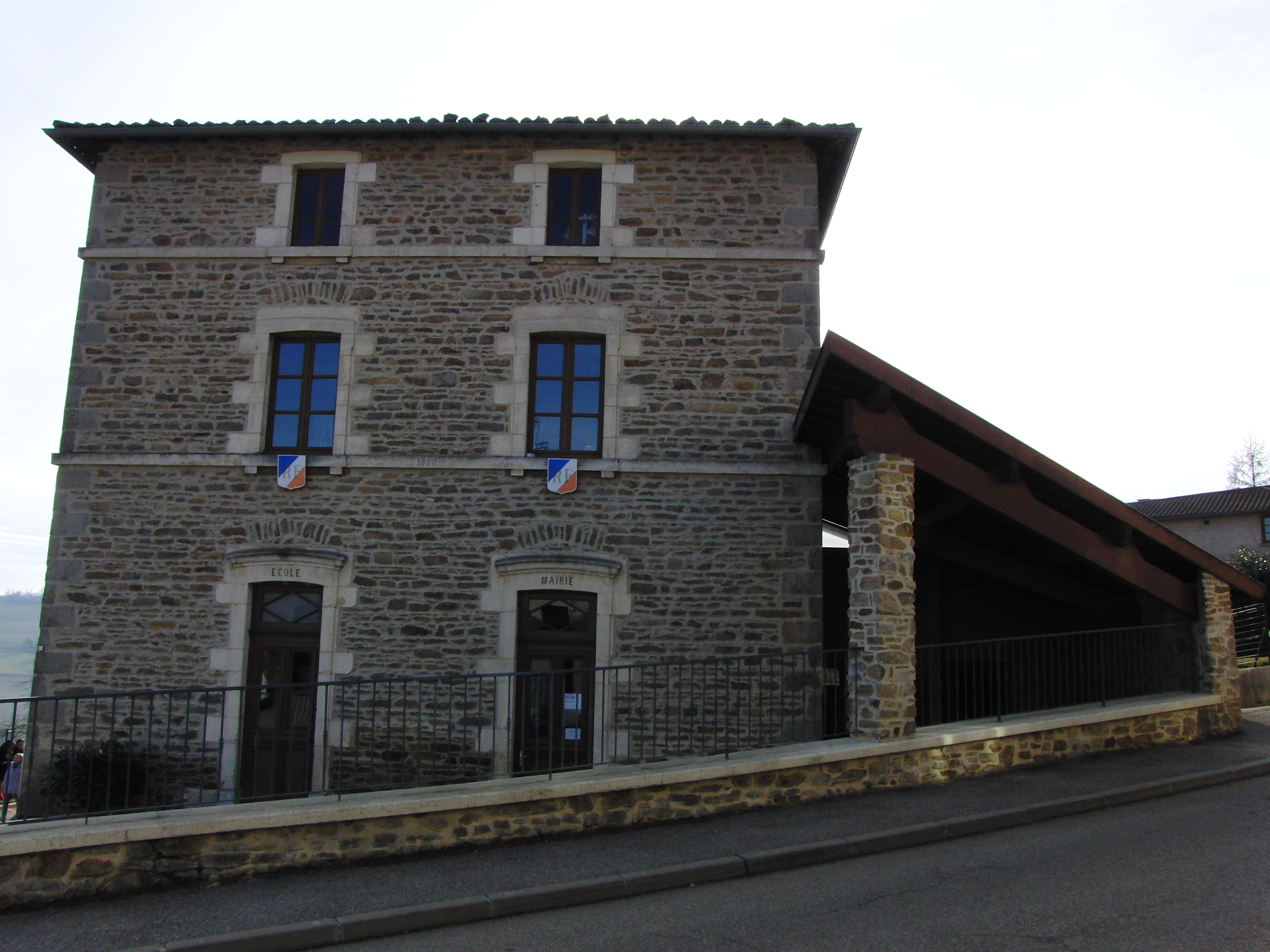
- The town hall in Saint-André-la-Côte

- Coat of arms
- Location of Saint-André-la-Côte
- Location within France Location within Auvergne-Rhône-Alpes
- Coordinates: 45°37′52″N 4°36′05″E
- Country: France
- Region: Auvergne-Rhône-Alpes
- Department: Rhône
- Arrondissement: Lyon
- Canton: Vaugneray

Government
  - Mayor (2020–2026): Marc Coste
- Area^{1}: 4.77 km^{2} (1.84 sq mi)
- Elevation: 937 m (3,074 ft)
- Highest elevation: 929 m (3,048 ft)
- Lowest elevation: 640 m (2,100 ft)
- Population (2023): 269
  - Density: 56.4/km^{2} (146/sq mi)
- Time zone: UTC+01:00 (CET)
  - Summer (DST): UTC+02:00 (CEST)
- INSEE/Postal code: 69180 /69440
- ^{1} French Land Register data, which excludes lakes, ponds, glaciers > 1 km^{2} (0.386 sq mi or 247 acres) and river estuaries.

Saint-André-la-Côte (French pronunciation: [sɛ̃t‿ɑ̃dʁe la kot]) is a commune in the Rhône department in eastern France.

== See also ==
- Communes of the Rhône department
