= Rontalon =

Rontalon Rantalon (Arpitan)
- Commune
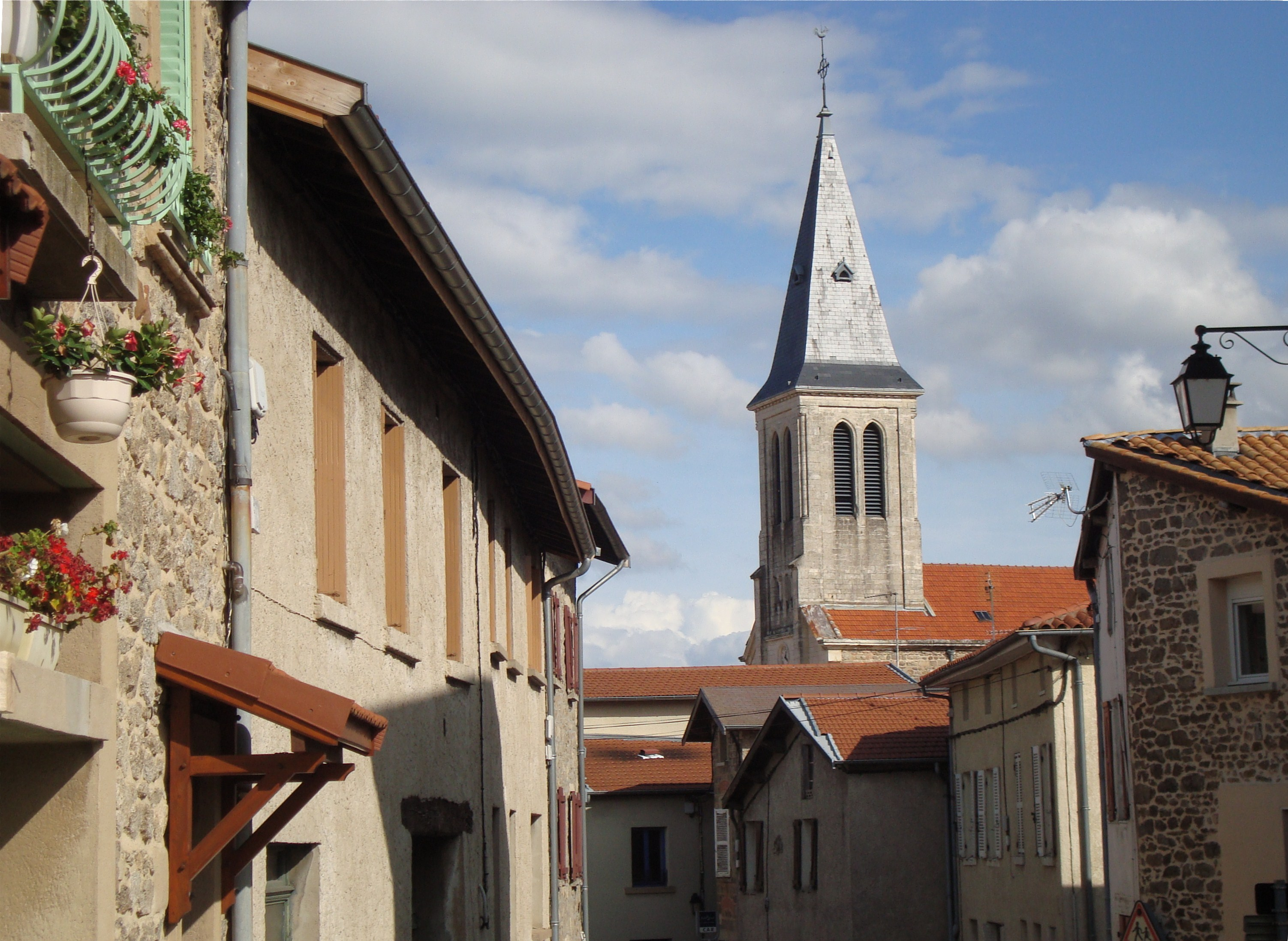
- The bell tower of Église Saint-Romain in Rontalon

- Coat of arms
- Location of Rontalon
- Location within France Location within Auvergne-Rhône-Alpes
- Coordinates: 45°39′40″N 4°37′58″E
- Country: France
- Region: Auvergne-Rhône-Alpes
- Department: Rhône
- Arrondissement: Lyon
- Canton: Vaugneray
- Intercommunality: CC du Pays mornantais

Government
  - Mayor (2020–2026): Christian Fromont
- Area^{1}: 12.67 km^{2} (4.89 sq mi)
- Elevation: 550 m (1,800 ft)
- Highest elevation: 820 m (2,690 ft)
- Lowest elevation: 377 m (1,237 ft)
- Population (2023): 1,170
  - Density: 92.3/km^{2} (239/sq mi)
- Demonym: Rontalonnais
- Time zone: UTC+01:00 (CET)
  - Summer (DST): UTC+02:00 (CEST)
- INSEE/Postal code: 69170 /69510
- Website: www.rontalon.fr
- ^{1} French Land Register data, which excludes lakes, ponds, glaciers > 1 km^{2} (0.386 sq mi or 247 acres) and river estuaries.

Rontalon (French pronunciation: [ʁɔ̃talɔ̃]; Arpitan: Rantalon) is a commune in the Rhône department in the Auvergne-Rhône-Alpes region in Eastern France.

== Gallery ==
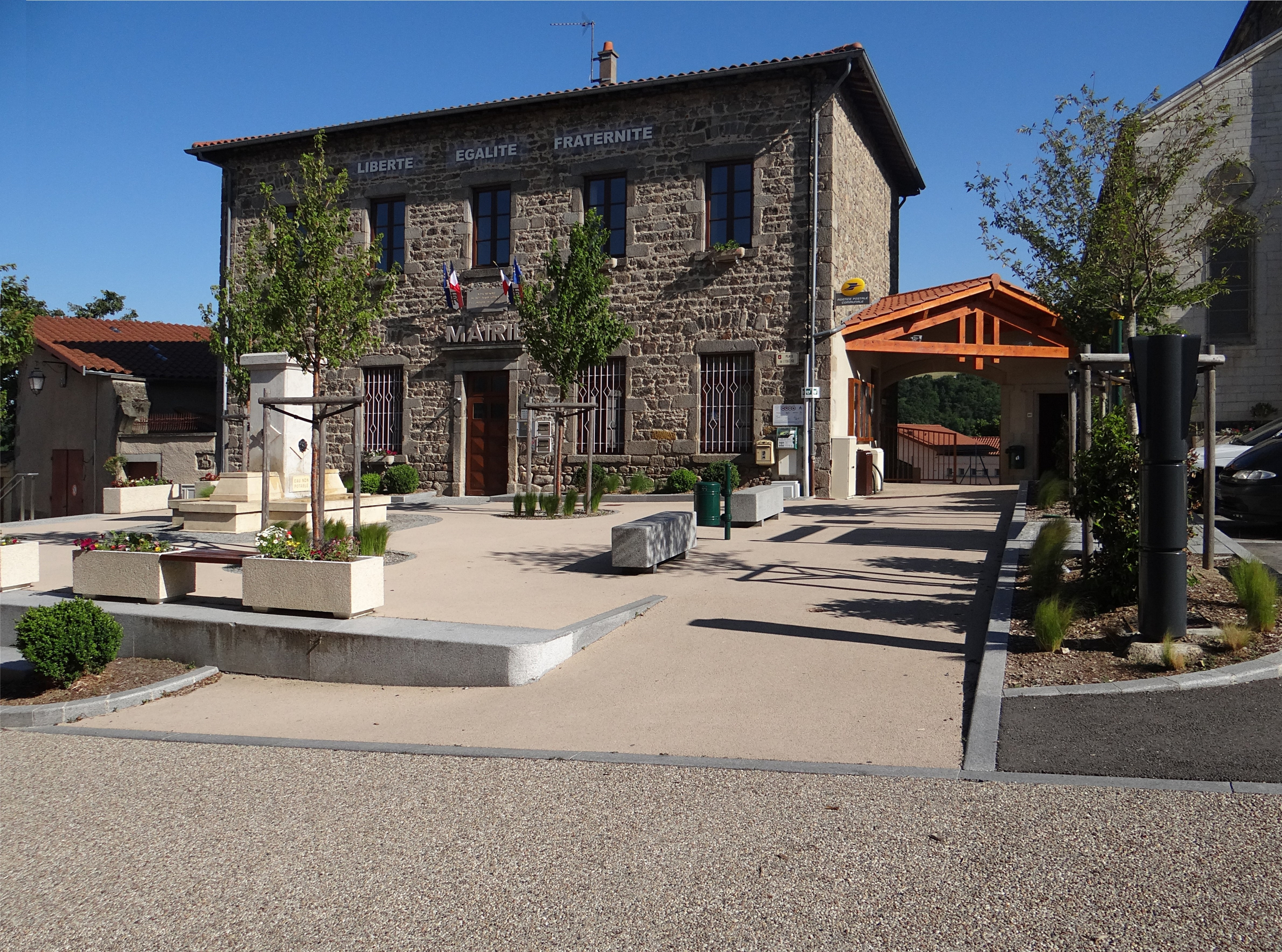
Town hall

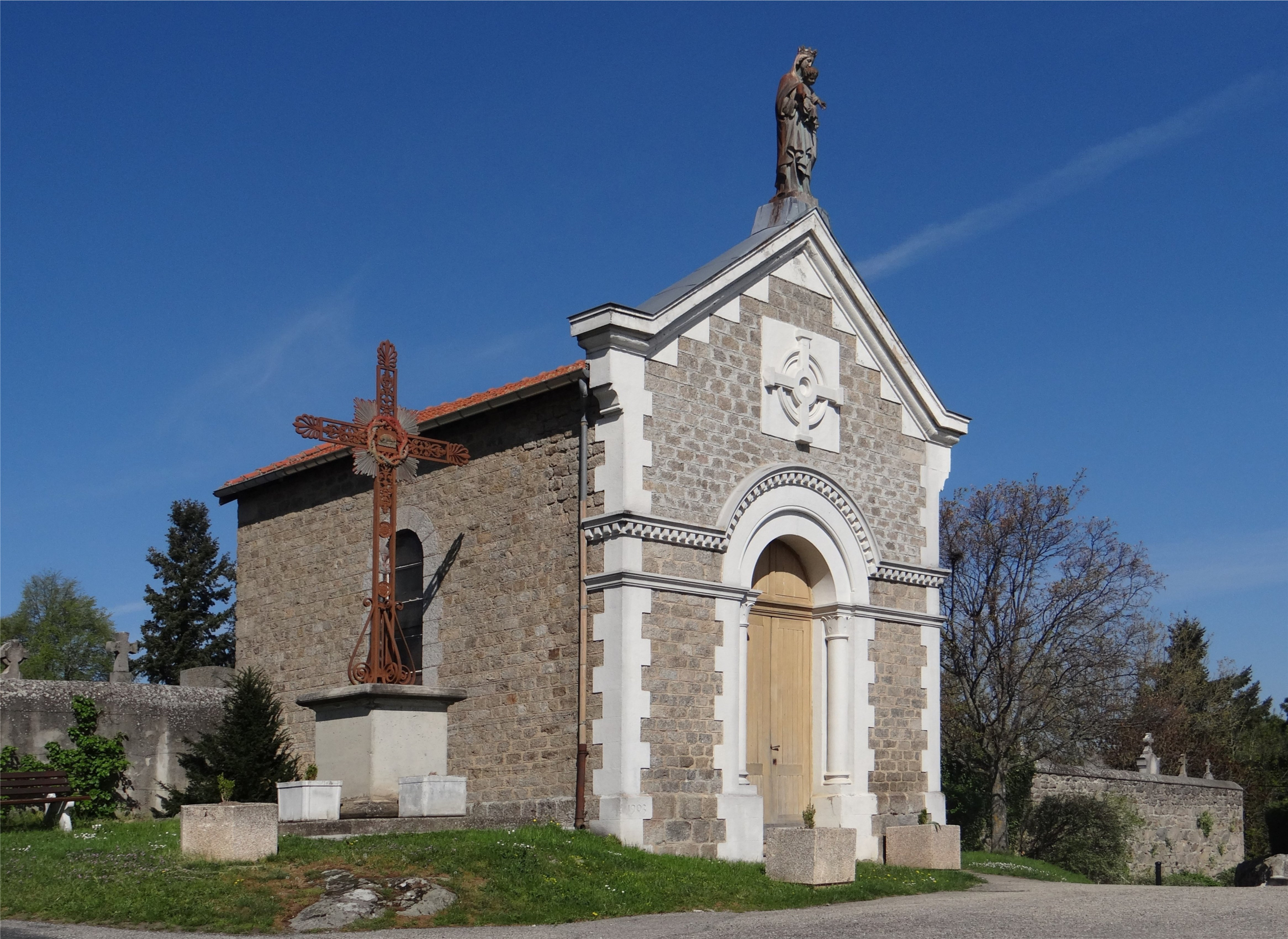
Chapelle Saint-Roch

== See also ==
- Communes of the Rhône department
