= Sainte-Consorce =

- Commune
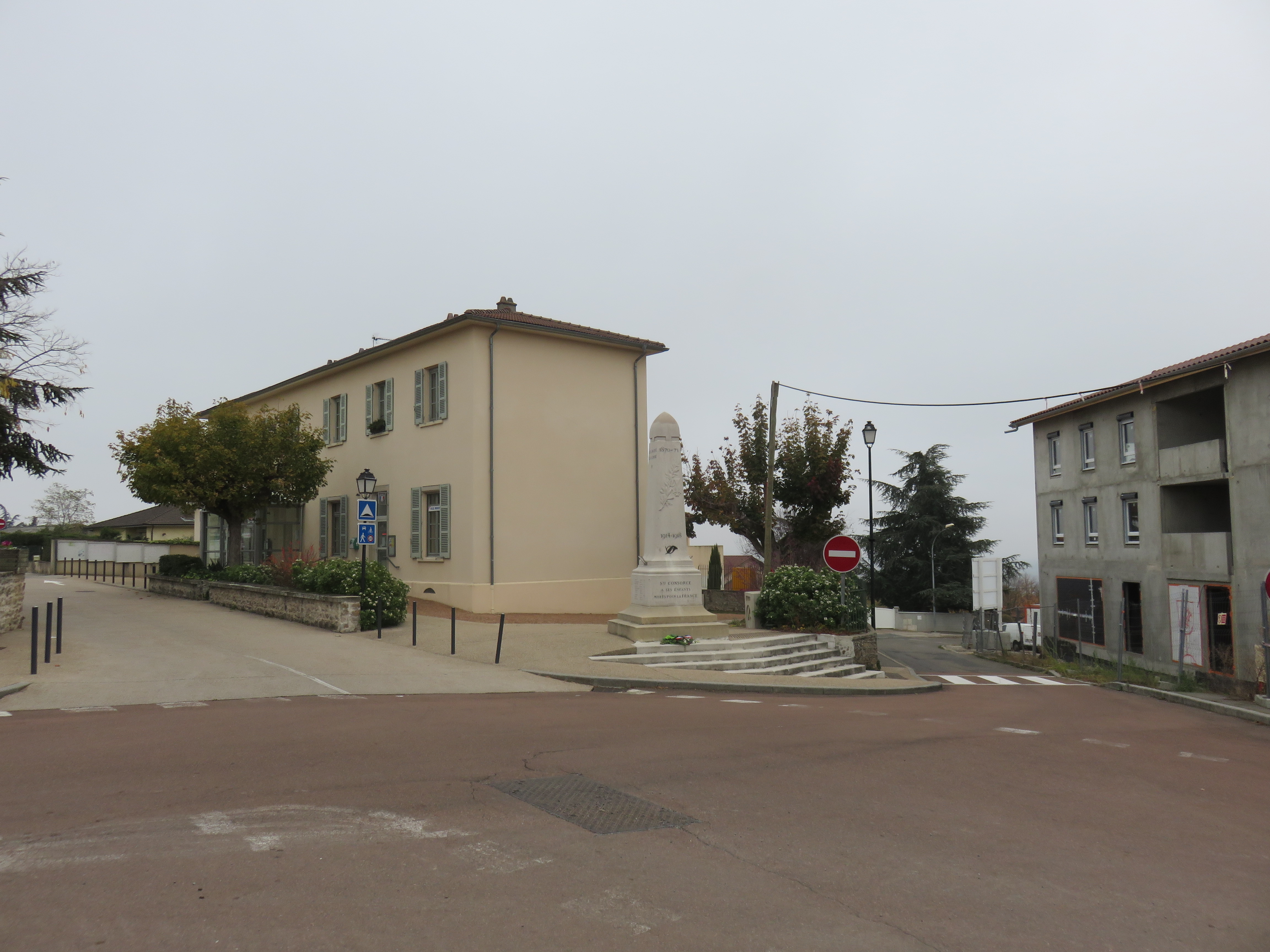
- Sainte-Consorce in 2017.

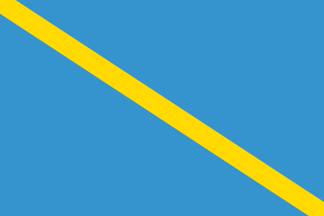
- Flag Coat of arms
- Location of Sainte-Consorce
- Location within France Location within Auvergne-Rhône-Alpes
- Coordinates: 45°46′36″N 4°41′28″E
- Country: France
- Region: Auvergne-Rhône-Alpes
- Department: Rhône
- Arrondissement: Lyon
- Canton: Vaugneray

Government
  - Mayor (2020–2026): Jean-Marc Thimonier
- Area^{1}: 5.81 km^{2} (2.24 sq mi)
- Elevation: 420 m (1,380 ft)
- Highest elevation: 431 m (1,414 ft)
- Lowest elevation: 279 m (915 ft)
- Population (2023): 2,154
  - Density: 371/km^{2} (960/sq mi)
- Time zone: UTC+01:00 (CET)
  - Summer (DST): UTC+02:00 (CEST)
- INSEE/Postal code: 69190 /69280
- ^{1} French Land Register data, which excludes lakes, ponds, glaciers > 1 km^{2} (0.386 sq mi or 247 acres) and river estuaries.

Sainte-Consorce is a commune in the Rhône department in eastern France.

== Population ==
Historical population
Year	Pop.	±% p.a.
1968	444	—
1975	767	+8.12%
1982	1,017	+4.11%
1990	1,223	+2.33%
1999	1,608	+3.09%
2007	1,829	+1.62%
2012	1,855	+0.28%
2017	1,939	+0.89%
2023	2,154	+1.77%
Source: INSEE

== See also ==
- Communes of the Rhône department
