= Aveize =

- Commune
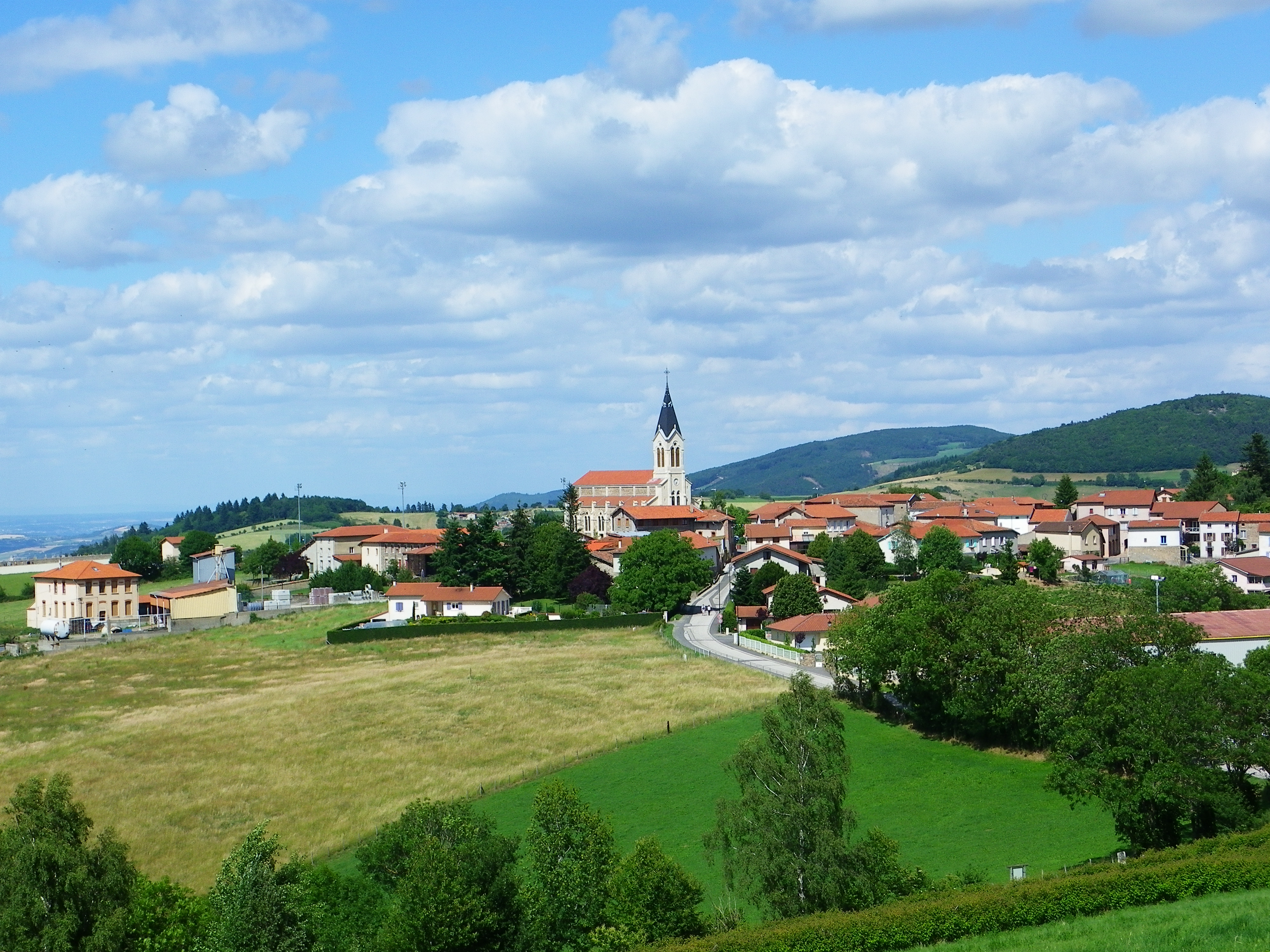
- The church and surrounding buildings, in Aveize
- Location of Aveize
- Location within France Location within Auvergne-Rhône-Alpes
- Coordinates: 45°41′39″N 4°28′43″E
- Country: France
- Region: Auvergne-Rhône-Alpes
- Department: Rhône
- Arrondissement: Lyon
- Canton: Vaugneray
- Intercommunality: CC Monts Lyonnais

Government
  - Mayor (2020–2026): Michel Bonnier
- Area^{1}: 16.64 km^{2} (6.42 sq mi)
- Elevation: 800 m (2,600 ft)
- Highest elevation: 928 m (3,045 ft)
- Lowest elevation: 428 m (1,404 ft)
- Population (2023): 1,110
  - Density: 66.7/km^{2} (173/sq mi)
- Time zone: UTC+01:00 (CET)
  - Summer (DST): UTC+02:00 (CEST)
- INSEE/Postal code: 69014 /69610
- ^{1} French Land Register data, which excludes lakes, ponds, glaciers > 1 km^{2} (0.386 sq mi or 247 acres) and river estuaries.

Aveize (French pronunciation: [avɛz]) is a commune of the Rhône department in eastern France.

== See also ==
Communes of the Rhône department
