= Thurins =

- Commune
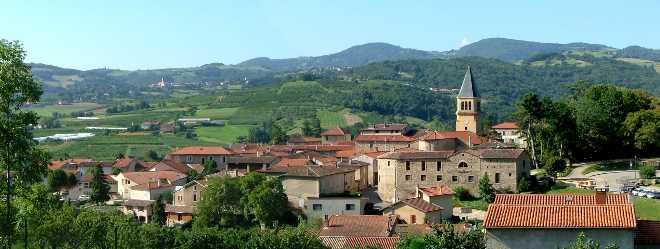
- A general view of Thurins

- Coat of arms
- Location of Thurins
- Location within France Location within Auvergne-Rhône-Alpes
- Coordinates: 45°40′57″N 4°38′29″E
- Country: France
- Region: Auvergne-Rhône-Alpes
- Department: Rhône
- Arrondissement: Lyon
- Canton: Vaugneray

Government
  - Mayor (2020–2026): Claude Claron
- Area^{1}: 19.36 km^{2} (7.47 sq mi)
- Elevation: 432 m (1,417 ft)
- Highest elevation: 791 m (2,595 ft)
- Lowest elevation: 306 m (1,004 ft)
- Population (2023): 3,404
  - Density: 175.8/km^{2} (455.4/sq mi)
- Time zone: UTC+01:00 (CET)
  - Summer (DST): UTC+02:00 (CEST)
- INSEE/Postal code: 69249 /69510
- ^{1} French Land Register data, which excludes lakes, ponds, glaciers > 1 km^{2} (0.386 sq mi or 247 acres) and river estuaries.

Thurins (French pronunciation: [tyʁɛ̃]) is a commune in the Rhône department in eastern France.

== Population ==
Historical population
| Year | Pop. | ±% p.a. |
|---|---|---|
| 1968 | 1,541 | — |
| 1975 | 1,619 | +0.71% |
| 1982 | 1,792 | +1.46% |
| 1990 | 2,104 | +2.03% |
| 1999 | 2,451 | +1.71% |
| 2007 | 2,762 | +1.50% |
| 2012 | 2,947 | +1.31% |
| 2017 | 3,050 | +0.69% |
| 2023 | 3,404 | +1.85% |
Source: INSEE

== See also ==
- Communes of the Rhône department
