= Saint-Jean-de-Touslas =

- Part of Beauvallon
- Coat of arms
- Location of Saint-Jean-de-Touslas
- Location within France Location within Auvergne-Rhône-Alpes
- Coordinates: 45°34′42″N 4°39′44″E
- Country: France
- Region: Auvergne-Rhône-Alpes
- Department: Rhône
- Arrondissement: Lyon
- Canton: Mornant
- Commune: Beauvallon
- Area^{1}: 5.57 km^{2} (2.15 sq mi)
- Elevation: 185 m (607 ft)
- Highest elevation: 364 m (1,194 ft)
- Lowest elevation: 187 m (614 ft)
- Population (2022): 951
  - Density: 171/km^{2} (442/sq mi)
- Time zone: UTC+01:00 (CET)
  - Summer (DST): UTC+02:00 (CEST)
- Postal code: 69700
- ^{1} French Land Register data, which excludes lakes, ponds, glaciers > 1 km^{2} (0.386 sq mi or 247 acres) and river estuaries.

Saint-Jean-de-Touslas (French pronunciation: [sɛ̃ ʒɑ̃ də tula]; Arpitan: Sant-Jian-d’Atolâs) is a former commune in the Rhône department in eastern France. On 1 January 2018, it was merged into the new commune of Beauvallon. Its population was 951 in 2022.

== See also ==
- Communes of the Rhône department
