= Coise =

- Commune
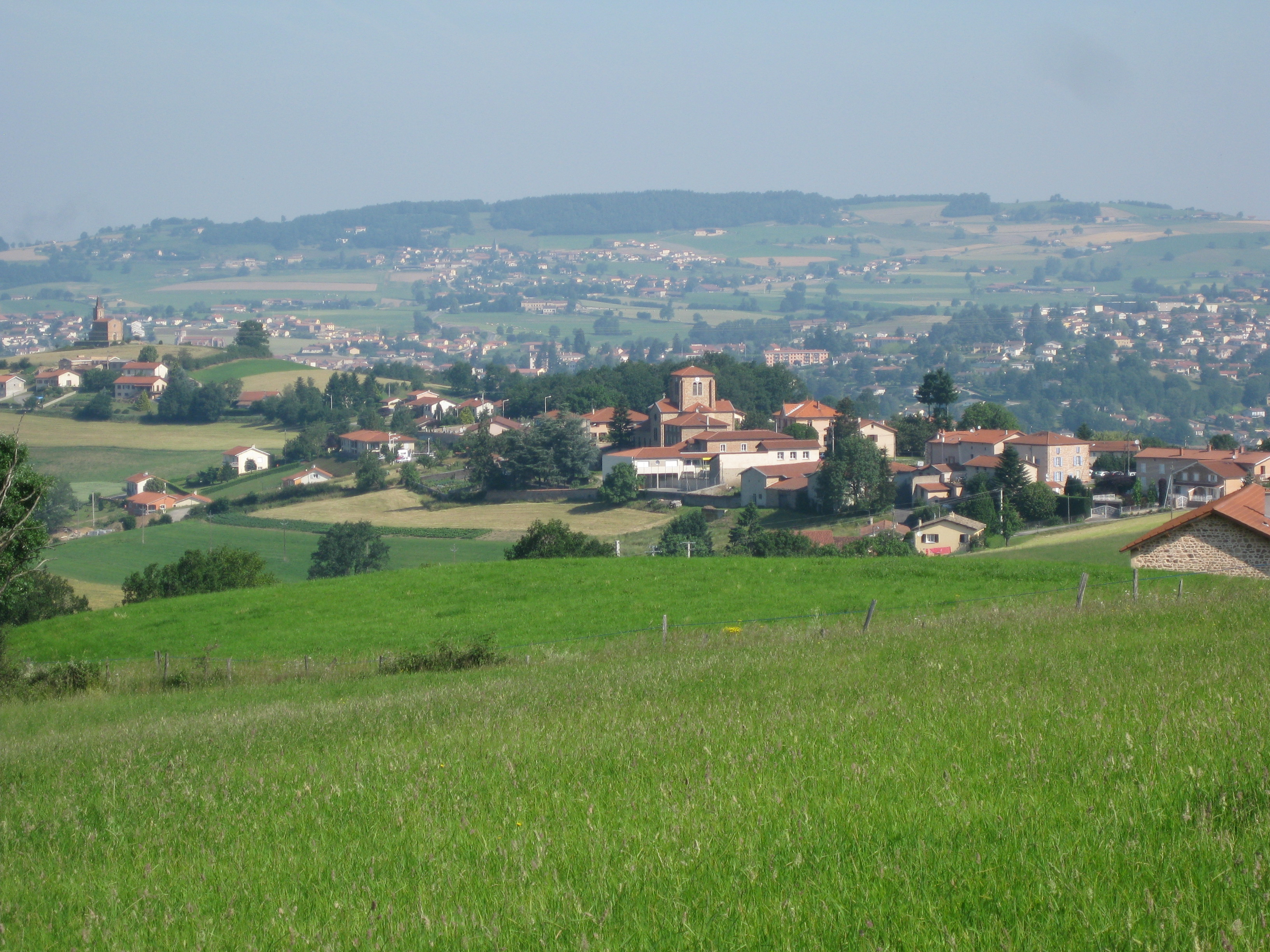
- A general view of Coise
- Location of Coise
- Location within France Location within Auvergne-Rhône-Alpes
- Coordinates: 45°36′52″N 4°28′27″E
- Country: France
- Region: Auvergne-Rhône-Alpes
- Department: Rhône
- Arrondissement: Lyon
- Canton: Vaugneray
- Intercommunality: CC des Monts du Lyonnais

Government
  - Mayor (2020–2026): Philippe Bonnier
- Area^{1}: 9.03 km^{2} (3.49 sq mi)
- Elevation: 700 m (2,300 ft)
- Highest elevation: 752 m (2,467 ft)
- Lowest elevation: 480 m (1,570 ft)
- Population (2023): 800
  - Density: 89/km^{2} (230/sq mi)
- Time zone: UTC+01:00 (CET)
  - Summer (DST): UTC+02:00 (CEST)
- INSEE/Postal code: 69062 /69590
- ^{1} French Land Register data, which excludes lakes, ponds, glaciers > 1 km^{2} (0.386 sq mi or 247 acres) and river estuaries.

Coise (French pronunciation: [kwaz]) is a commune in the Rhône department in eastern France.

== See also ==
- Communes of the Rhône department
