= Sainte-Catherine, Rhône =

Sainte-Catherine
- Commune
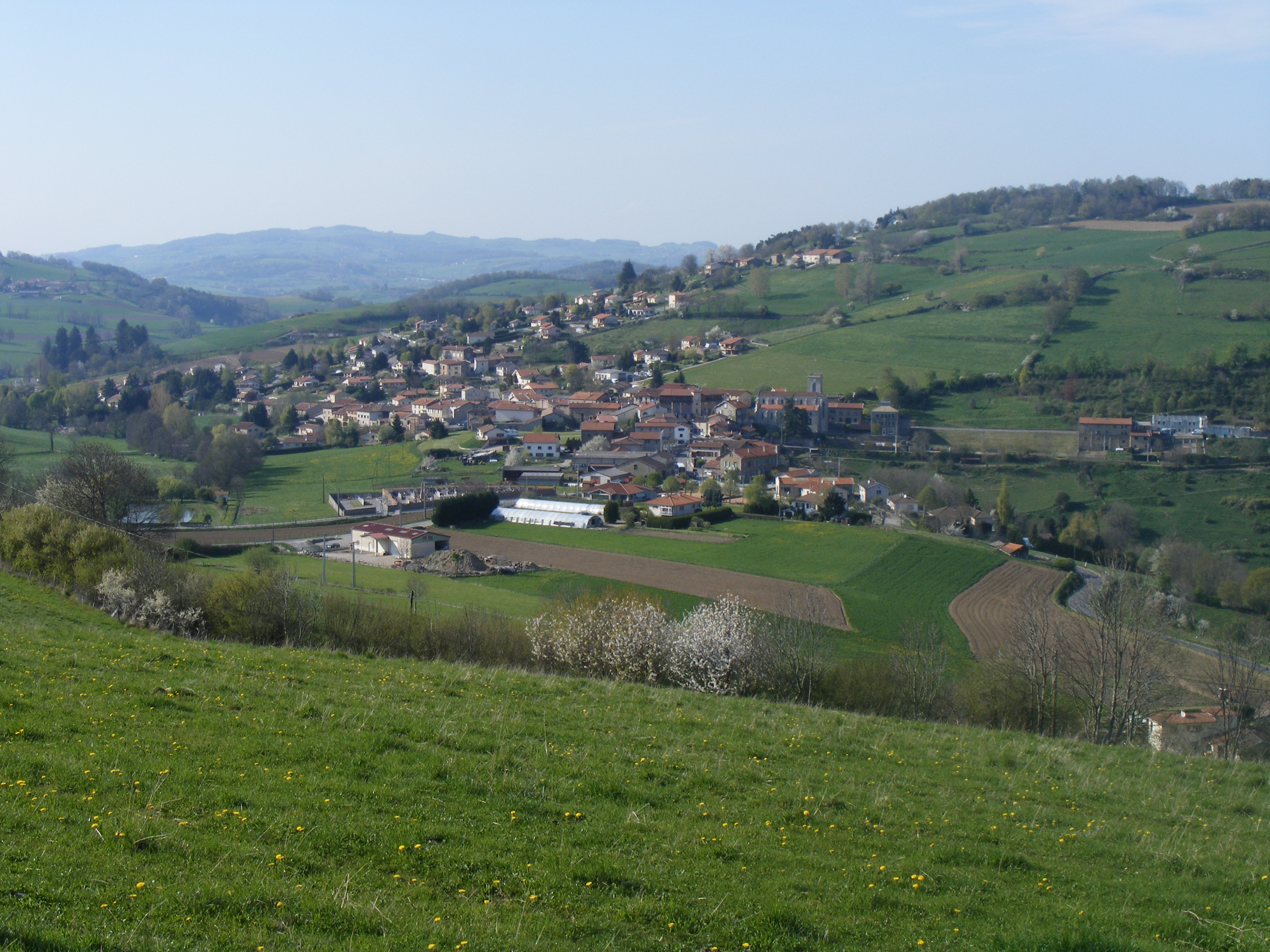
- A general view from the summit of Châtelard

- Coat of arms
- Location of Sainte-Catherine
- Location within France Location within Auvergne-Rhône-Alpes
- Coordinates: 45°36′00″N 4°34′14″E
- Country: France
- Region: Auvergne-Rhône-Alpes
- Department: Rhône
- Arrondissement: Lyon
- Canton: Vaugneray
- Intercommunality: CC des Monts du Lyonnais

Government
  - Mayor (2020–2026): Pierre Dussurgey
- Area^{1}: 13.76 km^{2} (5.31 sq mi)
- Elevation: 700 m (2,300 ft)
- Highest elevation: 911 m (2,989 ft)
- Lowest elevation: 547 m (1,795 ft)
- Population (2023): 969
  - Density: 70.4/km^{2} (182/sq mi)
- Time zone: UTC+01:00 (CET)
  - Summer (DST): UTC+02:00 (CEST)
- INSEE/Postal code: 69184 /69440
- ^{1} French Land Register data, which excludes lakes, ponds, glaciers > 1 km^{2} (0.386 sq mi or 247 acres) and river estuaries.

Sainte-Catherine (French pronunciation: [sɛ̃t katʁin]) is a commune in the Rhône department in eastern France.

== See also ==
- Communes of the Rhône department
