= Saint-Andéol-le-Château =

Saint-Andéol-le-Château Sant-Anduér (Arpitan)
- Part of Beauvallon
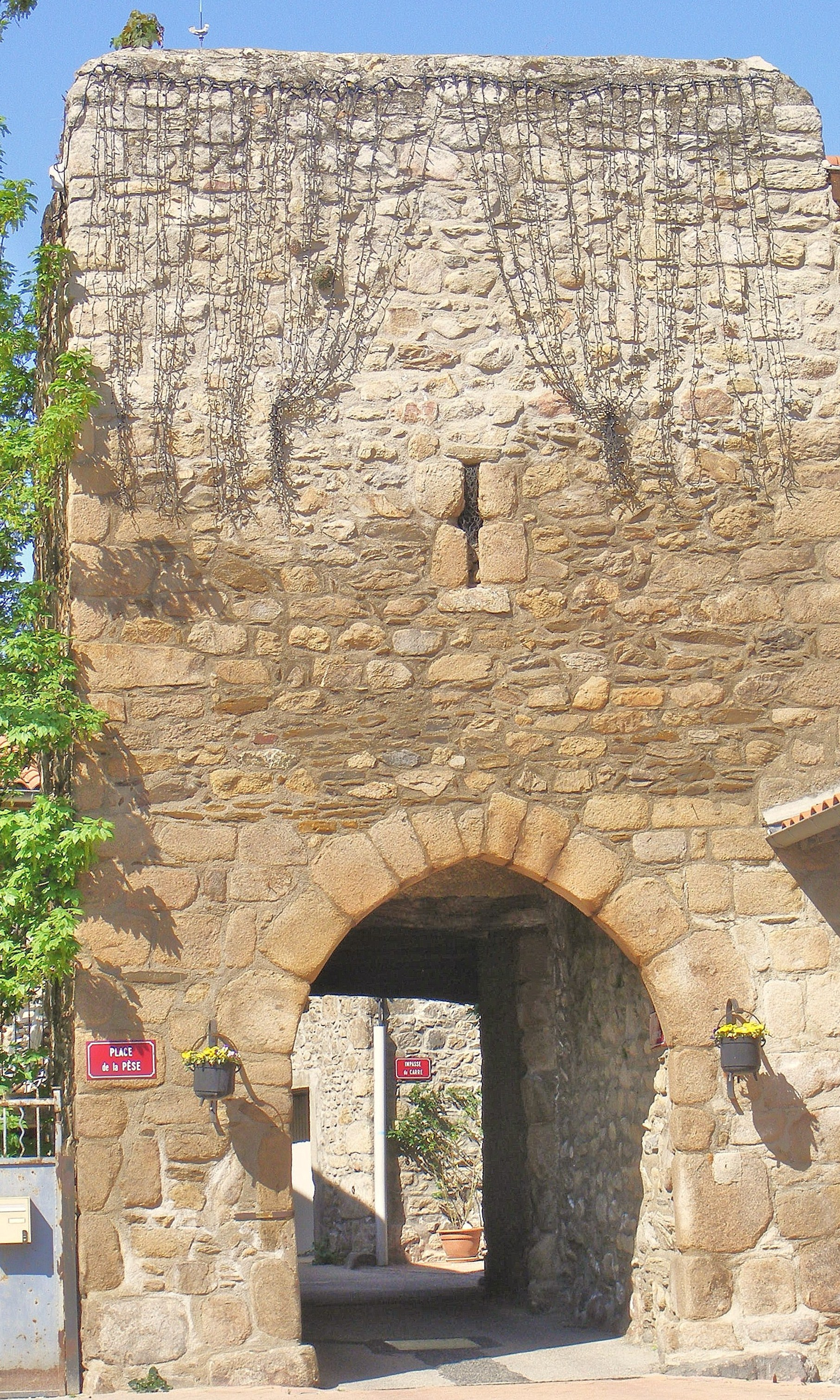
- The mediaeval gate

- Coat of arms
- Location of Saint-Andéol-le-Château
- Location within France Location within Auvergne-Rhône-Alpes
- Coordinates: 45°35′12″N 4°41′45″E
- Country: France
- Region: Auvergne-Rhône-Alpes
- Department: Rhône
- Arrondissement: Lyon
- Canton: Mornant
- Commune: Beauvallon
- Area^{1}: 9.95 km^{2} (3.84 sq mi)
- Elevation: 300 m (980 ft)
- Highest elevation: 363 m (1,191 ft)
- Lowest elevation: 189 m (620 ft)
- Population (2022): 1,924
  - Density: 193/km^{2} (501/sq mi)
- Time zone: UTC+01:00 (CET)
  - Summer (DST): UTC+02:00 (CEST)
- Postal code: 69700
- ^{1} French Land Register data, which excludes lakes, ponds, glaciers > 1 km^{2} (0.386 sq mi or 247 acres) and river estuaries.

Saint-Andéol-le-Château (French: [sɛ̃t‿ɑ̃deɔl lə ʃɑto]; Arpitan: Sant-Anduér or Sent-Anduér) is a former commune in the Rhône department in eastern France. On 1 January 2018, it was merged into the new commune of Beauvallon.

== See also ==
- Communes of the Rhône department
