= Pomeys =

- Commune
- Coat of arms
- Location of Pomeys
- Location within France Location within Auvergne-Rhône-Alpes
- Coordinates: 45°39′02″N 4°26′41″E
- Country: France
- Region: Auvergne-Rhône-Alpes
- Department: Rhône
- Arrondissement: Lyon
- Canton: Vaugneray
- Intercommunality: CC des Monts du Lyonnais

Government
  - Mayor (2020–2026): Jean-Marc Goutagny
- Area^{1}: 13.1 km^{2} (5.1 sq mi)
- Elevation: 760 m (2,490 ft)
- Highest elevation: 764 m (2,507 ft)
- Lowest elevation: 502 m (1,647 ft)
- Population (2023): 1,126
  - Density: 86.0/km^{2} (223/sq mi)
- Time zone: UTC+01:00 (CET)
  - Summer (DST): UTC+02:00 (CEST)
- INSEE/Postal code: 69155 /69590
- ^{1} French Land Register data, which excludes lakes, ponds, glaciers > 1 km^{2} (0.386 sq mi or 247 acres) and river estuaries.

Pomeys is a commune in the Rhône department in eastern France.

== History ==
The legend traces the origins of the parish of St Martin de Pomeys (village name) to the life of the great apostle of the French countryside: St. Martin. Returning from his homeland of Hungary, the bishop of Tours would have stopped at the inexhaustible fountain known as the "fountain St Martin". He would have left there, engraved on the stone, the mark with his stick. This fountain is located on the "raitchemin de St Martin" on the way to the bois de Pomeys.

== See also ==
- Communes of the Rhône department
