= La Chapelle-sur-Coise =

- Commune
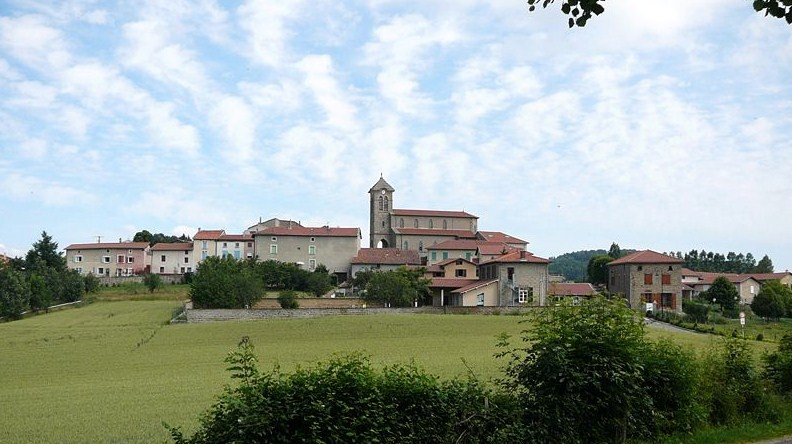
- The church and surrounding buildings in La Chapelle-sur-Coise
- Location of La Chapelle-sur-Coise
- Location within France Location within Auvergne-Rhône-Alpes
- Coordinates: 45°39′20″N 4°30′02″E
- Country: France
- Region: Auvergne-Rhône-Alpes
- Department: Rhône
- Arrondissement: Lyon
- Canton: Vaugneray
- Intercommunality: CC des Monts du Lyonnais

Government
  - Mayor (2020–2026): Christiane Bouteille
- Area^{1}: 6.58 km^{2} (2.54 sq mi)
- Elevation: 700 m (2,300 ft)
- Highest elevation: 784 m (2,572 ft)
- Lowest elevation: 599 m (1,965 ft)
- Population (2023): 565
  - Density: 85.9/km^{2} (222/sq mi)
- Time zone: UTC+01:00 (CET)
  - Summer (DST): UTC+02:00 (CEST)
- INSEE/Postal code: 69042 /69590
- ^{1} French Land Register data, which excludes lakes, ponds, glaciers > 1 km^{2} (0.386 sq mi or 247 acres) and river estuaries.

La Chapelle-sur-Coise (French pronunciation: [la ʃapɛl syʁ kwaz]) is a commune in the Rhône department in eastern France. The population is 568 people (2018).

The municipality is located about 390 km southeast of Paris, 33 km west of Lyon.

== See also ==
Communes of the Rhône department
