= Duerne =

- Commune
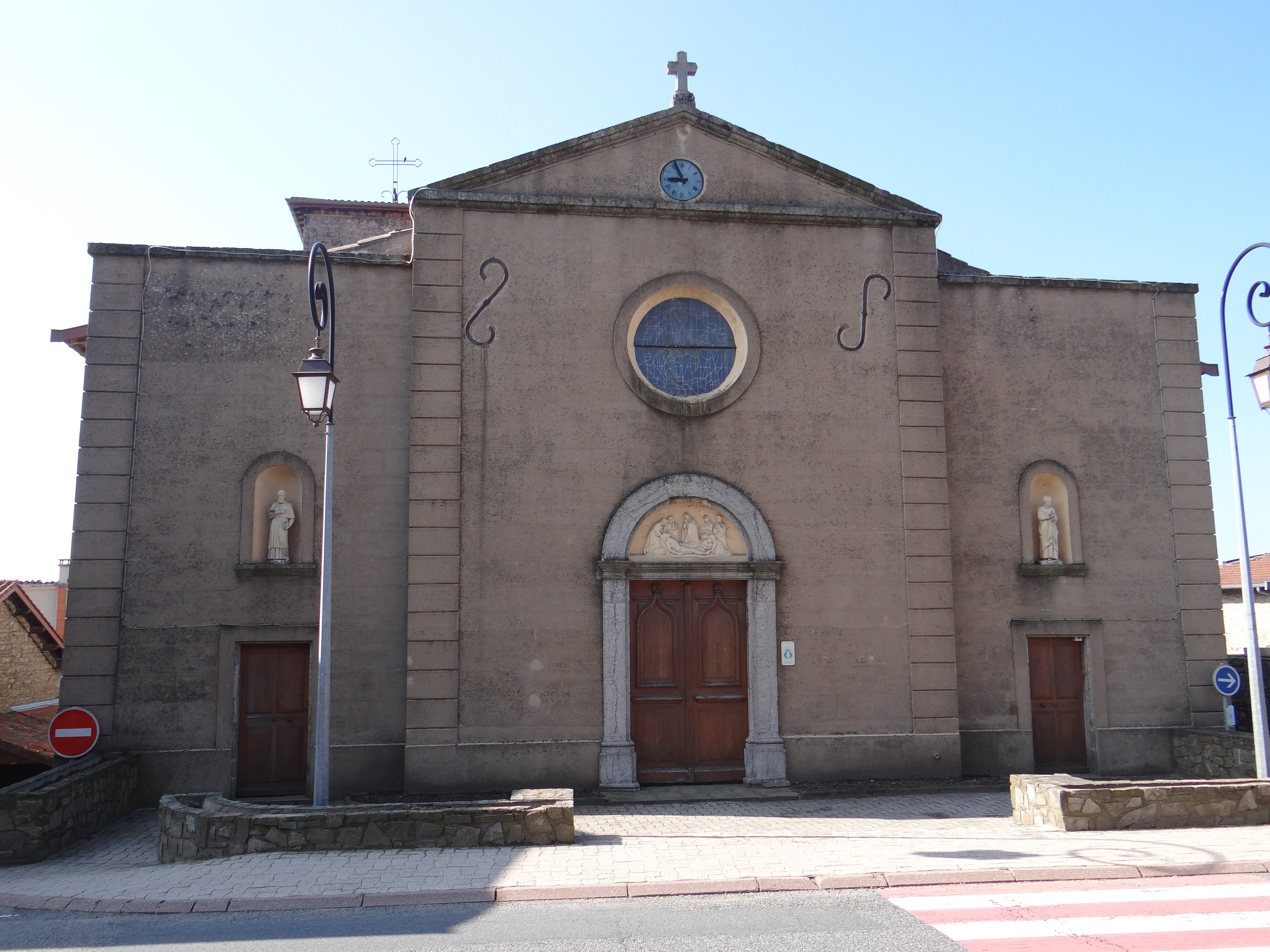
- The church of Saint-Jean-Apôtre, in Duerne
- Location of Duerne
- Location within France Location within Auvergne-Rhône-Alpes
- Coordinates: 45°41′07″N 4°31′41″E
- Country: France
- Region: Auvergne-Rhône-Alpes
- Department: Rhône
- Arrondissement: Lyon
- Canton: Vaugneray
- Intercommunality: CC des Monts du Lyonnais

Government
  - Mayor (2020–2026): Benoît Vernaison
- Area^{1}: 11.41 km^{2} (4.41 sq mi)
- Elevation: 800 m (2,600 ft)
- Highest elevation: 892 m (2,927 ft)
- Lowest elevation: 516 m (1,693 ft)
- Population (2023): 841
  - Density: 73.7/km^{2} (191/sq mi)
- Time zone: UTC+01:00 (CET)
  - Summer (DST): UTC+02:00 (CEST)
- INSEE/Postal code: 69078 /69850
- ^{1} French Land Register data, which excludes lakes, ponds, glaciers > 1 km^{2} (0.386 sq mi or 247 acres) and river estuaries.

Duerne (French pronunciation: [dɥɛʁn]) is a commune in the Rhône department in eastern France.

== Demography ==
Historical population
Year	Pop.	±% p.a.
1968	551	—
1975	526	−0.66%
1982	570	+1.15%
1990	604	+0.73%
1999	660	+0.99%
2007	751	+1.63%
2012	781	+0.79%
2017	829	+1.20%
2023	841	+0.24%
Source: INSEE

== See also ==
- Communes of the Rhône department
