= Meys =

- Commune
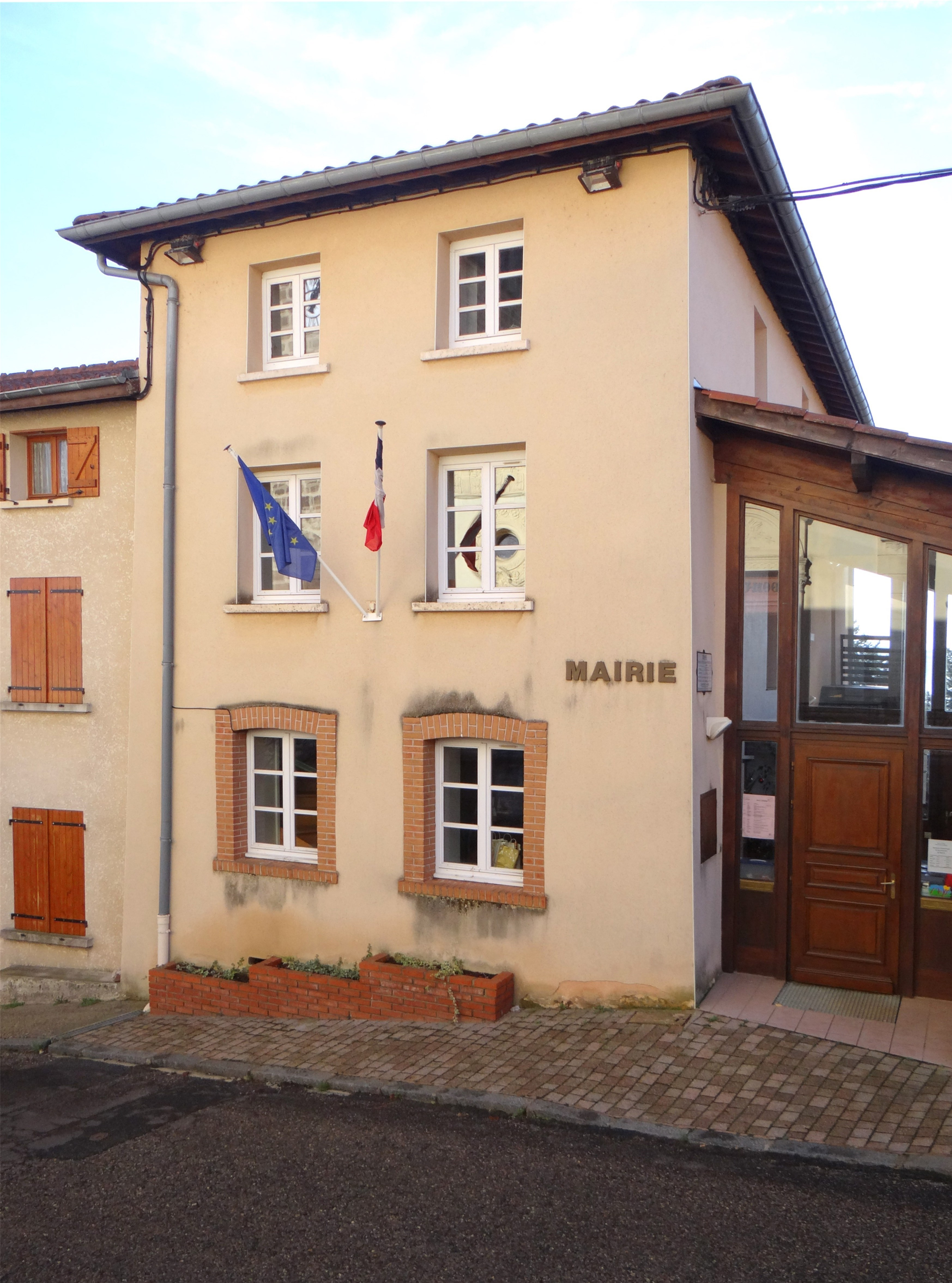
- Town hall
- Location of Meys
- Location within France Location within Auvergne-Rhône-Alpes
- Coordinates: 45°40′47″N 4°23′14″E
- Country: France
- Region: Auvergne-Rhône-Alpes
- Department: Rhône
- Arrondissement: Lyon
- Canton: Vaugneray
- Intercommunality: CC des Monts du Lyonnais

Government
  - Mayor (2020–2026): Philippe Garnier
- Area^{1}: 14.65 km^{2} (5.66 sq mi)
- Elevation: 547 m (1,795 ft)
- Highest elevation: 647 m (2,123 ft)
- Lowest elevation: 436 m (1,430 ft)
- Population (2023): 861
  - Density: 58.8/km^{2} (152/sq mi)
- Time zone: UTC+01:00 (CET)
  - Summer (DST): UTC+02:00 (CEST)
- INSEE/Postal code: 69132 /69610
- ^{1} French Land Register data, which excludes lakes, ponds, glaciers > 1 km^{2} (0.386 sq mi or 247 acres) and river estuaries.

Meys is a commune in the Rhône department in eastern France.

== Demography ==
Historical population
Year	Pop.	±% p.a.
1968	597	—
1975	563	−0.83%
1982	544	−0.49%
1990	592	+1.06%
1999	637	+0.82%
2007	674	+0.71%
2012	800	+3.49%
2017	850	+1.22%
2023	861	+0.21%
Source: INSEE

== See also ==
- Communes of the Rhône department
