= Canton of Vaugneray =

Coordinates: 45.7395°N 4.6708°E

Vaugneray
- Canton
- Country: France
- Region: Auvergne-Rhône-Alpes
- Department: Rhône
- No. of communes: {{{nbcomm}}}
- Area: 267.16 km^{2} (103.15 sq mi)
- Population (2023): 33,891
  - Density: 126.86/km^{2} (328.56/sq mi)
- INSEE code: 6912

The Canton of Vaugneray is a French administrative division, located in the Rhône department.

The canton was established in 1790 and modified by decree of 27 February 2014 which came into force in March 2015.

== Composition ==
The canton of Vaugneray is composed of 18 communes:

Communes	Population (2012)
Aveize	1,119
Coise	749
Duerne	781
Grézieu-le-Marché	764
La Chapelle-sur-Coise	554
Larajasse	1,837
Meys	800
Pollionnay	2,151
Pomeys	1,068
Rontalon	1,179
Saint-André-la-Côte	280
Sainte-Catherine	927
Sainte-Consorce	1,855
Saint-Martin-en-Haut	3,847
Saint-Symphorien-sur-Coise	3,522
Thurins	2,947
Vaugneray	4,925
Yzeron	1,022

== See also ==
- Cantons of the Rhône department
- Communes of the Rhône department
