= Cantons of the Rhône department =

The following is a list of the 13 cantons of the Rhône department, in France, following the French canton reorganisation which came into effect in March 2015:

- Anse
- L'Arbresle
- Belleville-en-Beaujolais
- Brignais
- Genas
- Gleizé
- Mornant
- Saint-Symphorien-d'Ozon
- Tarare
- Thizy-les-Bourgs
- Val d'Oingt
- Vaugneray
- Villefranche-sur-Saône
