= Arrondissement of Lyon =

Coordinates: 45°46′01″N 4°50′03″E

Lyon
- Arrondissement
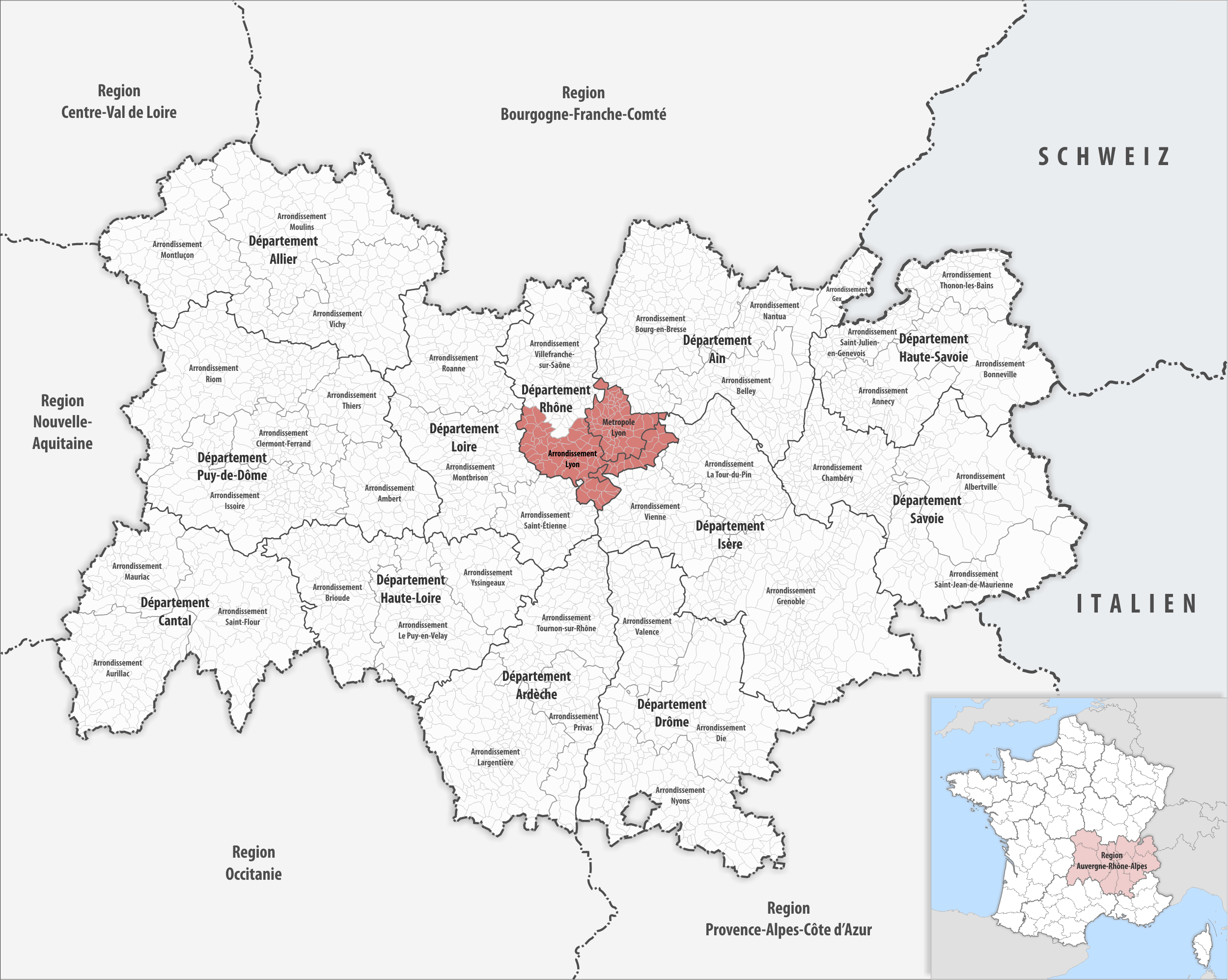
- Location within the region Auvergne-Rhône-Alpes
- Country: France
- Region: Auvergne-Rhône-Alpes
- Department: Rhône and Lyon Metropolis
- No. of communes: {{{nbcomm}}}
- Area: 1,534.6 km^{2} (592.5 sq mi)
- Population (2023): 1,653,401
  - Density: 1,077.4/km^{2} (2,790.5/sq mi)
- INSEE code: 691

The arrondissement of Lyon is an arrondissement of France in the Auvergne-Rhône-Alpes region. It has 134 communes. Its population is 1,637,827 (2021), and its area is 1,534.6 km^{2} (592.5 sq mi).

== Composition ==
The communes of the arrondissement of Lyon are:

1. Albigny-sur-Saône (69003)
2. Ampuis (69007)
3. Aveize (69014)
4. Beauvallon (69179)
5. Brignais (69027)
6. Brindas (69028)
7. Bron (69029)
8. Brullioles (69030)
9. Brussieu (69031)
10. Cailloux-sur-Fontaines (69033)
11. Caluire-et-Cuire (69034)
12. Chabanière (69228)
13. Chambost-Longessaigne (69038)
14. Champagne-au-Mont-d'Or (69040)
15. La Chapelle-sur-Coise (69042)
16. Chaponnay (69270)
17. Chaponost (69043)
18. Charbonnières-les-Bains (69044)
19. Charly (69046)
20. Chassieu (69271)
21. Chaussan (69051)
22. Coise (69062)
23. Collonges-au-Mont-d'Or (69063)
24. Colombier-Saugnieu (69299)
25. Communay (69272)
26. Condrieu (69064)
27. Corbas (69273)
28. Couzon-au-Mont-d'Or (69068)
29. Craponne (69069)
30. Curis-au-Mont-d'Or (69071)
31. Dardilly (69072)
32. Décines-Charpieu (69275)
33. Duerne (69078)
34. Échalas (69080)
35. Écully (69081)
36. Feyzin (69276)
37. Fleurieu-sur-Saône (69085)
38. Fontaines-Saint-Martin (69087)
39. Fontaines-sur-Saône (69088)
40. Francheville (69089)
41. Genas (69277)
42. Genay (69278)
43. Givors (69091)
44. Grézieu-la-Varenne (69094)
45. Grézieu-le-Marché (69095)
46. Grigny (69096)
47. Les Haies (69097)
48. Les Halles (69098)
49. Haute-Rivoire (69099)
50. Irigny (69100)
51. Jonage (69279)
52. Jons (69280)
53. Larajasse (69110)
54. Limonest (69116)
55. Lissieu (69117)
56. Loire-sur-Rhône (69118)
57. Longes (69119)
58. Longessaigne (69120)
59. Lyon (69123)
60. Marcy-l'Étoile (69127)
61. Marennes (69281)
62. Messimy (69131)
63. Meys (69132)
64. Meyzieu (69282)
65. Millery (69133)
66. Mions (69283)
67. Montagny (69136)
68. Montanay (69284)
69. Montromant (69138)
70. Montrottier (69139)
71. Mornant (69141)
72. La Mulatière (69142)
73. Neuville-sur-Saône (69143)
74. Orliénas (69148)
75. Oullins-Pierre-Bénite (69149)
76. Poleymieux-au-Mont-d'Or (69153)
77. Pollionnay (69154)
78. Pomeys (69155)
79. Pusignan (69285)
80. Quincieux (69163)
81. Rillieux-la-Pape (69286)
82. Riverie (69166)
83. Rochetaillée-sur-Saône (69168)
84. Rontalon (69170)
85. Saint-André-la-Côte (69180)
86. Saint-Bonnet-de-Mure (69287)
87. Saint-Clément-les-Places (69187)
88. Saint-Cyr-au-Mont-d'Or (69191)
89. Saint-Cyr-sur-le-Rhône (69193)
90. Saint-Didier-au-Mont-d'Or (69194)
91. Sainte-Catherine (69184)
92. Sainte-Colombe (69189)
93. Sainte-Consorce (69190)
94. Sainte-Foy-l'Argentière (69201)
95. Sainte-Foy-lès-Lyon (69202)
96. Saint-Fons (69199)
97. Saint-Genis-l'Argentière (69203)
98. Saint-Genis-Laval (69204)
99. Saint-Genis-les-Ollières (69205)
100. Saint-Germain-au-Mont-d'Or (69207)
101. Saint-Laurent-d'Agny (69219)
102. Saint-Laurent-de-Chamousset (69220)
103. Saint-Laurent-de-Mure (69288)
104. Saint-Martin-en-Haut (69227)
105. Saint-Pierre-de-Chandieu (69289)
106. Saint-Priest (69290)
107. Saint-Romain-au-Mont-d'Or (69233)
108. Saint-Romain-en-Gal (69235)
109. Saint-Romain-en-Gier (69236)
110. Saint-Symphorien-d'Ozon (69291)
111. Saint-Symphorien-sur-Coise (69238)
112. Sathonay-Camp (69292)
113. Sathonay-Village (69293)
114. Sérézin-du-Rhône (69294)
115. Simandres (69295)
116. Solaize (69296)
117. Soucieu-en-Jarrest (69176)
118. Souzy (69178)
119. Taluyers (69241)
120. Tassin-la-Demi-Lune (69244)
121. Ternay (69297)
122. Thurins (69249)
123. La Tour-de-Salvagny (69250)
124. Toussieu (69298)
125. Trèves (69252)
126. Tupin-et-Semons (69253)
127. Vaugneray (69255)
128. Vaulx-en-Velin (69256)
129. Vénissieux (69259)
130. Vernaison (69260)
131. Villechenève (69263)
132. Villeurbanne (69266)
133. Vourles (69268)
134. Yzeron (69269)

== History ==
The arrondissement of Lyon was created in 1800. On 1 January 2015, 101 communes that did not join the newly created Metropolis of Lyon passed from the arrondissement of Lyon to the arrondissement of Villefranche-sur-Saône. On 1 February 2017, 78 communes passed from the arrondissement of Villefranche-sur-Saône to the arrondissement of Lyon.

As a result of the reorganisation of the cantons of France which came into effect in 2015, the borders of the cantons are no longer related to the borders of the arrondissements. The cantons of the arrondissement of Lyon were, as of January 2015:

1. L'Arbresle
2. Bron
3. Caluire-et-Cuire
4. Condrieu
5. Décines-Charpieu
6. Écully
7. Givors
8. Irigny
9. Limonest
10. Lyon-I
11. Lyon-II
12. Lyon-III
13. Lyon-IV
14. Lyon-V
15. Lyon-VI
16. Lyon-VII
17. Lyon-VIII
18. Lyon-IX
19. Lyon-X
20. Lyon-XI
21. Lyon-XII
22. Lyon-XIII
23. Lyon-XIV
24. Meyzieu
25. Mornant
26. Neuville-sur-Saône
27. Oullins
28. Rillieux-la-Pape
29. Sainte-Foy-lès-Lyon
30. Saint-Fons
31. Saint-Genis-Laval
32. Saint-Laurent-de-Chamousset
33. Saint-Priest
34. Saint-Symphorien-d'Ozon
35. Saint-Symphorien-sur-Coise
36. Tassin-la-Demi-Lune
37. Vaugneray
38. Vaulx-en-Velin
39. Vénissieux-Nord
40. Vénissieux-Sud
41. Villeurbanne-Centre
42. Villeurbanne-Nord
43. Villeurbanne-Sud
