= List of streets in the 1st arrondissement of Paris =

This is a list of streets in the 1st arrondissement of Paris with etymological information.

== A ==
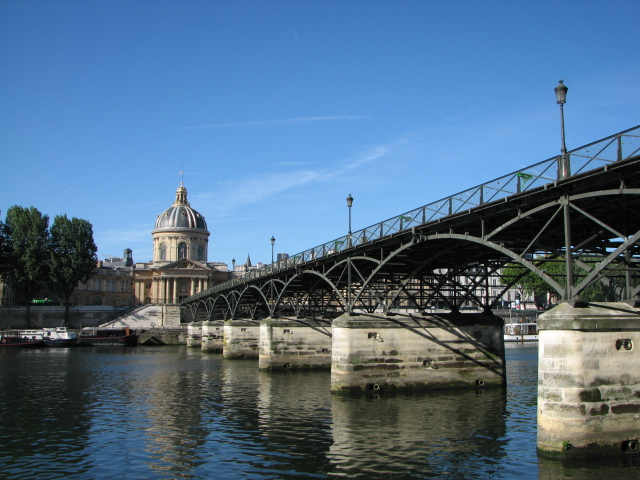
Pont des Arts

- Rue Adolphe-Jullien - Adolphe Jullien (1803–1873) - director of the Chemins de fer de l'Ouest railway
- Quai Aimé-Césaire - Aimé Césaire (1913–2008) - writer and representative of Martinique in the National Assembly
- Rue d'Alger - in commemoration of the capture of Algiers by French forces on July 5, 1830
- Rue de l'Amiral-de-Coligny - Admiral Gaspard II de Coligny (1519–1572)
- Allée André-Breton - André Breton (1896–1966) - writer
- Place André-Malraux - André Malraux (1901–1976) - writer and politician
- Passage Antoine-Carême - Marie-Antoine Carême (1784–1833) - chef
- Rue de l'Arbre-Sec
- Rue d'Argenteuil - Argenteuil, a commune in Val-d'Oise
- Pont des Arts - named due to its proximity to the Louvre

== B ==
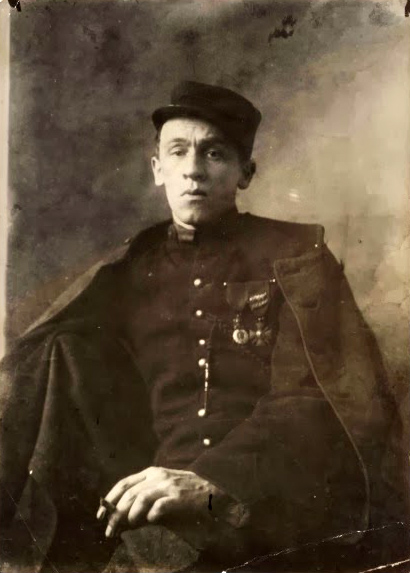
Blaise Cendrars

- Rue Baillet - Jean Baillet, treasurer to Charles V of France
- Rue Bailleul - Robet Bailleul, accounts clerk who lived on the street
- Allée Baltard - Victor Baltard (1805–1874), architect
- Rue Basse - named due to its proximity to Place Basse
- Passage de Beaujolais - named due to its proximity to the Rue de Beaujolais
- Rue de Beaujolais - comte de Beaujolais, a title given to sons of the Duke of Orléans
- Rue Berger - Jean Jacque Berger (1791–1859), prefect of the Seine
- Rue Bertin-Poirée - Bertin Poirée, a resident of the street
- Allée Blaise-Cendrars - Blaise Cendrars (1877–1961), writer
- Rue des Bons-Enfants - Collège des Bons-Enfants
- Rue Boucher - Pierre-Richard Boucher, politician
- Rue du Bouloi - a hotel once situated there
- Impasse des Bourdonnais - named due to its proximity to the Rue des Bourdonnais
- Rue des Bourdonnais - Adam and Guillaume Bourdon, Mathematician

== C ==
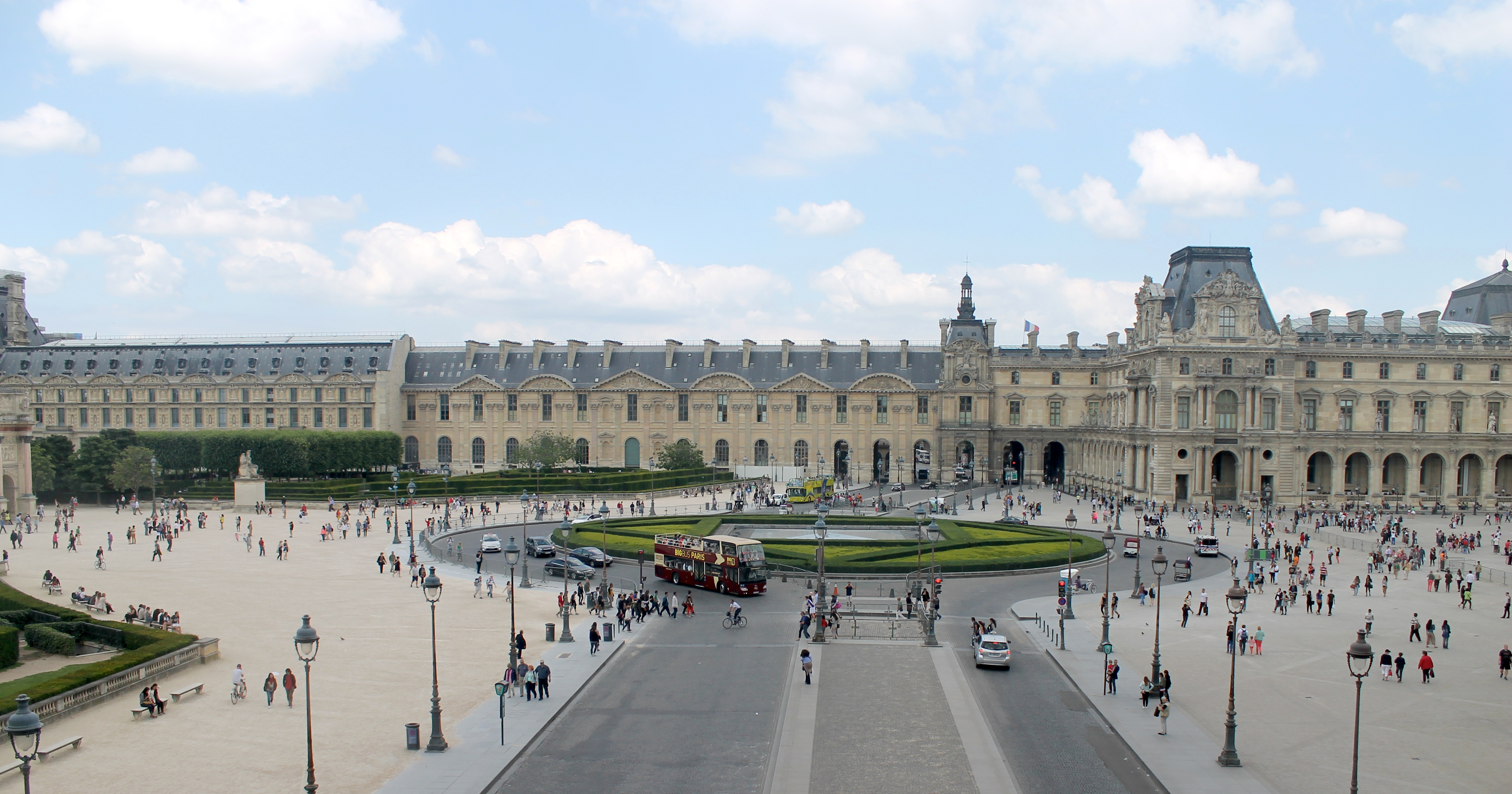
Place du Carrousel

- Rue Cambon - Pierre-Joseph Cambon (1756–1820), politician
- Rue des Capucines - a former Capuchin convent
- Place du Carrousel - named for the military carrousel (dressage) given for the birth of Louis, Grand Dauphin
- Pont du Carrousel - named due to its proximity to the Place du Carrousel
- Rue de Castiglione - Battle of Castiglione
- Rue Catinat - Nicolas Catinat (1637–1712), Marshal of France
- Pont au Change - named for the money changers once established there
- Place du Châtelet - once the site of the Grand Châtelet
- Rue du Chevalier-de-Saint-George - Chevalier de Saint-Georges (1739–1799), musician
- Rue Clémence-Royer - Clémence Royer (1830–1902), philosopher and economist
- Place Colette - Colette (1873–1954), writer
- Rue du Colonel-Driant - Émile Driant (1855–1916), military officer
- Rue Coq-Héron - so named in 1298
- Rue Coquillière - named for a city gate
- Rue de la Cossonnerie - named for an ancient poultry market
- Rue Courtalon - Guillaume Courtalon, a former resident
- Rue Croix-des-Petits-Champs - named for a cross once situated here
- Rue du Cygne - swan

== D ==
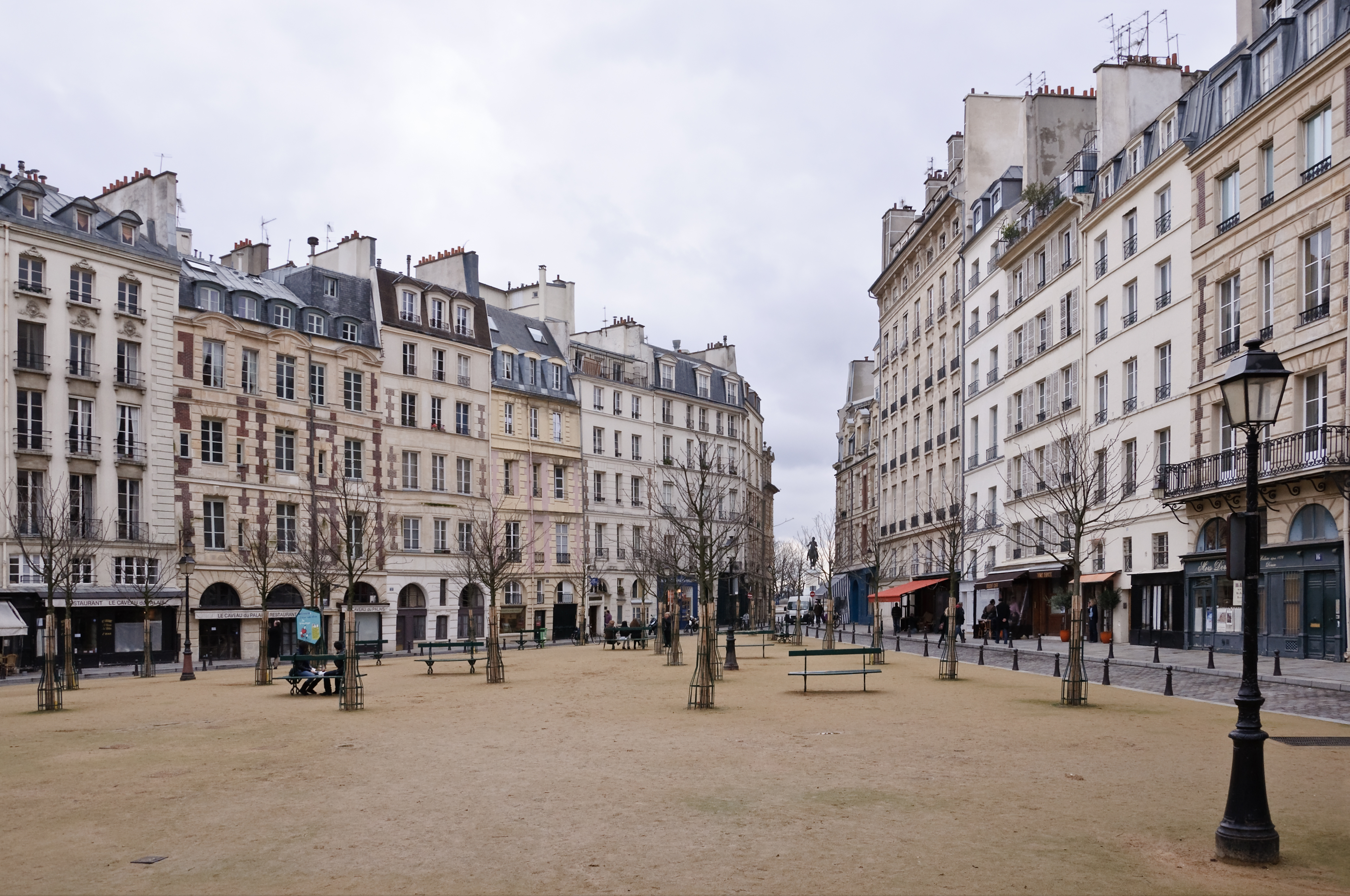
The Place Dauphine looking west toward the Pont Neuf

- Rue Danielle-Casanova - Danielle Casanova (1909–1943), member of the French Resistance
- Place Dauphine - Louis XIII (1601–1643), monarch
- Rue des Déchargeurs - unloaders
- Rue des Deux-Boules - two balls
- Place des Deux-Écus - two Écus
- Passage des Deux-Pavillons - named for the two pavilions at the corner of it and the Rue de Beaujolais
- Rue Duphot - Mathurin-Léonard Duphot (1769–1797)

== E ==
- Rue de l'Échelle - named for the Archbishop's ladder
- Place de l'École - school
- Rue Édouard-Colonne - Édouard Colonne (1838–1910), conductor
- Rue Étienne-Marcel - Étienne Marcel (1310–1358), provost of Paris

== F ==
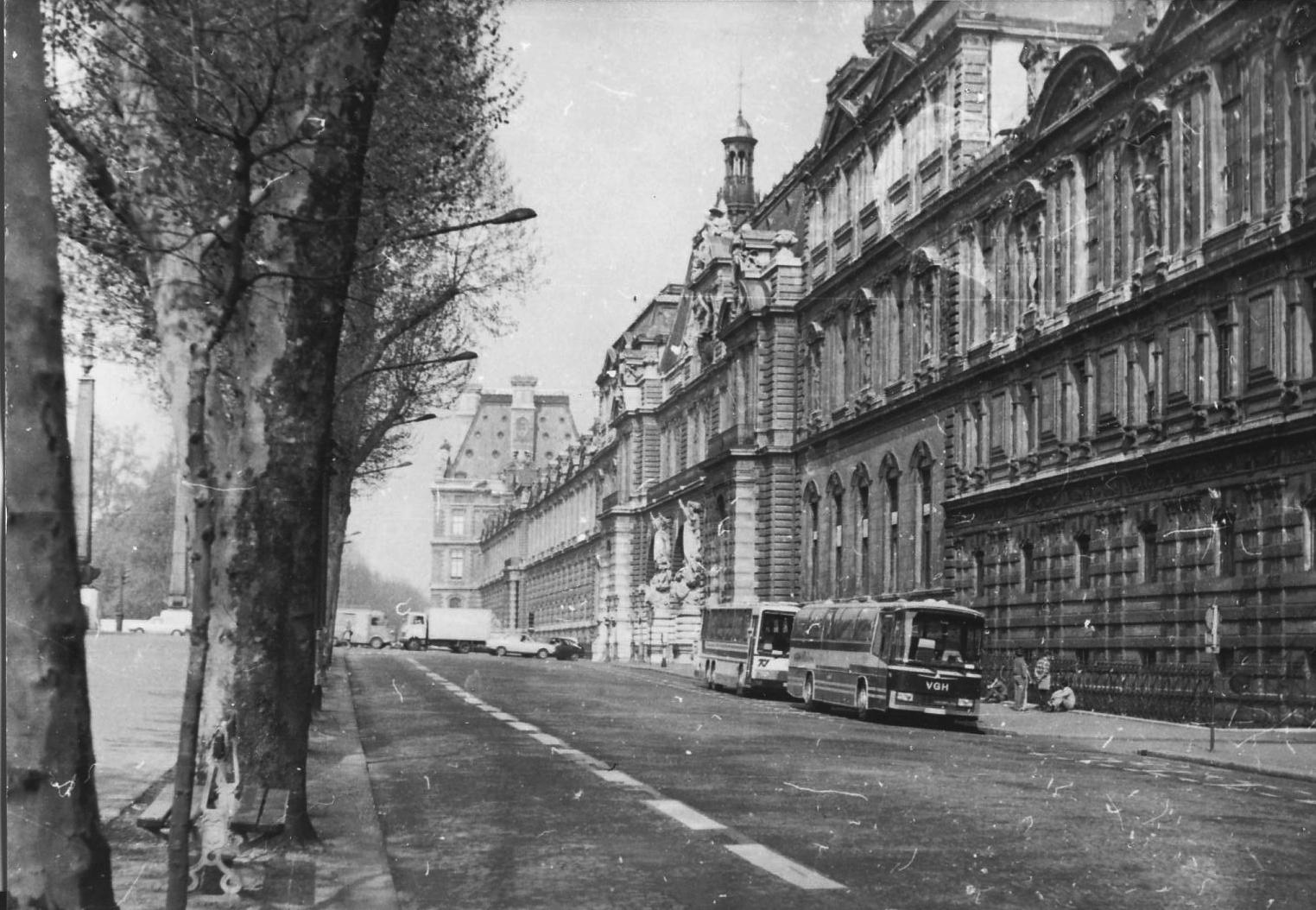
Quai François Mitterrand

- Allée Federico-Garcia-Lorca - Federico García Lorca (1899–1936), poet
- Cour des Fermes - former location of the Ferme générale
- Rue de la Ferronnerie - named for the ironworks which were located here
- Rue Française - a corruption of the former name of Rue Françoise, named for Francis I of France (1494–1547)
- Quai François-Mitterrand - François Mitterrand (1915–1996), President of France

== G ==
- Avenue du Général-Lemonnier - Ḗmile Lemonnier (1893–1945), general
- Voie Georges-Pompidou - Georges Pompidou (1911–1974), President of France
- Impasse Gomboust - named due to its proximity to the Rue Gomboust
- Rue Gomboust - Jacques Gomboust, engineer to the King
- Rue de la Grande-Truanderie - named for duties which were collected nearby

== H ==
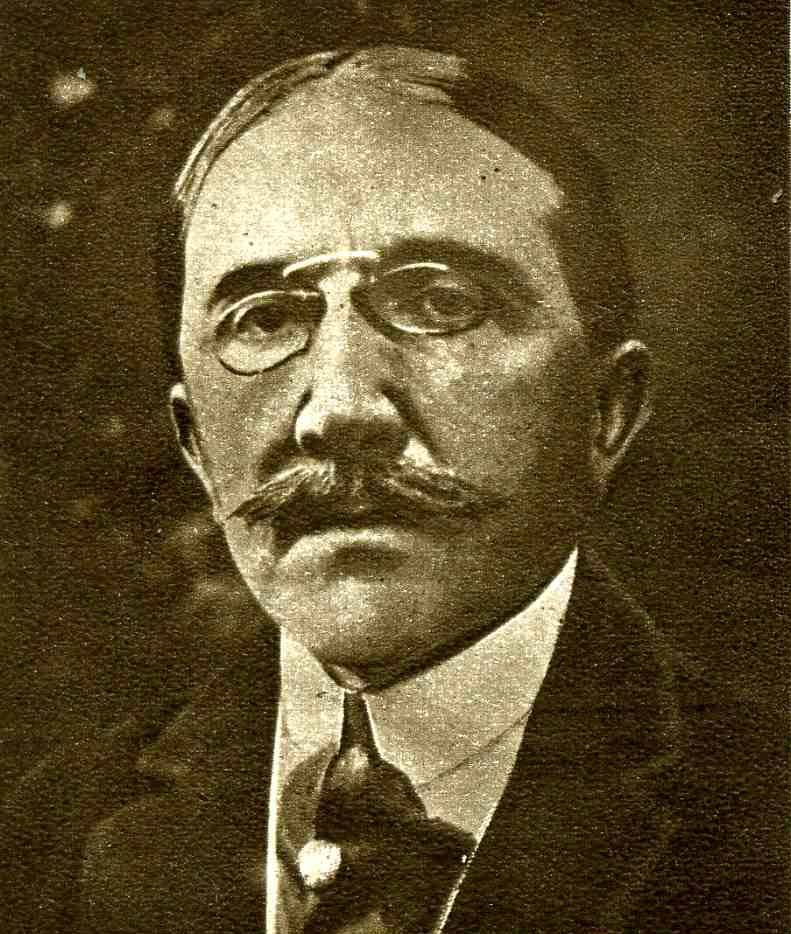
Henri-Robert

- Rue des Halles - named for the central market at its terminus
- Rue de Harlay - Achille Harlay de Sancy (1581–1646), intellectual and diplomat
- Rue Henri-Robert - Henri-Robert (1863–1936), lawyer and historian
- Rue Herold - Ferdinand Hérold (1791–1833), composer
- Quai de l'Horloge - clock
- Passage Hulot - Monsieur Hulot, a former resident

== I ==
- Rue des Innocents - site of the former Holy Innocents' Cemetery

== J ==
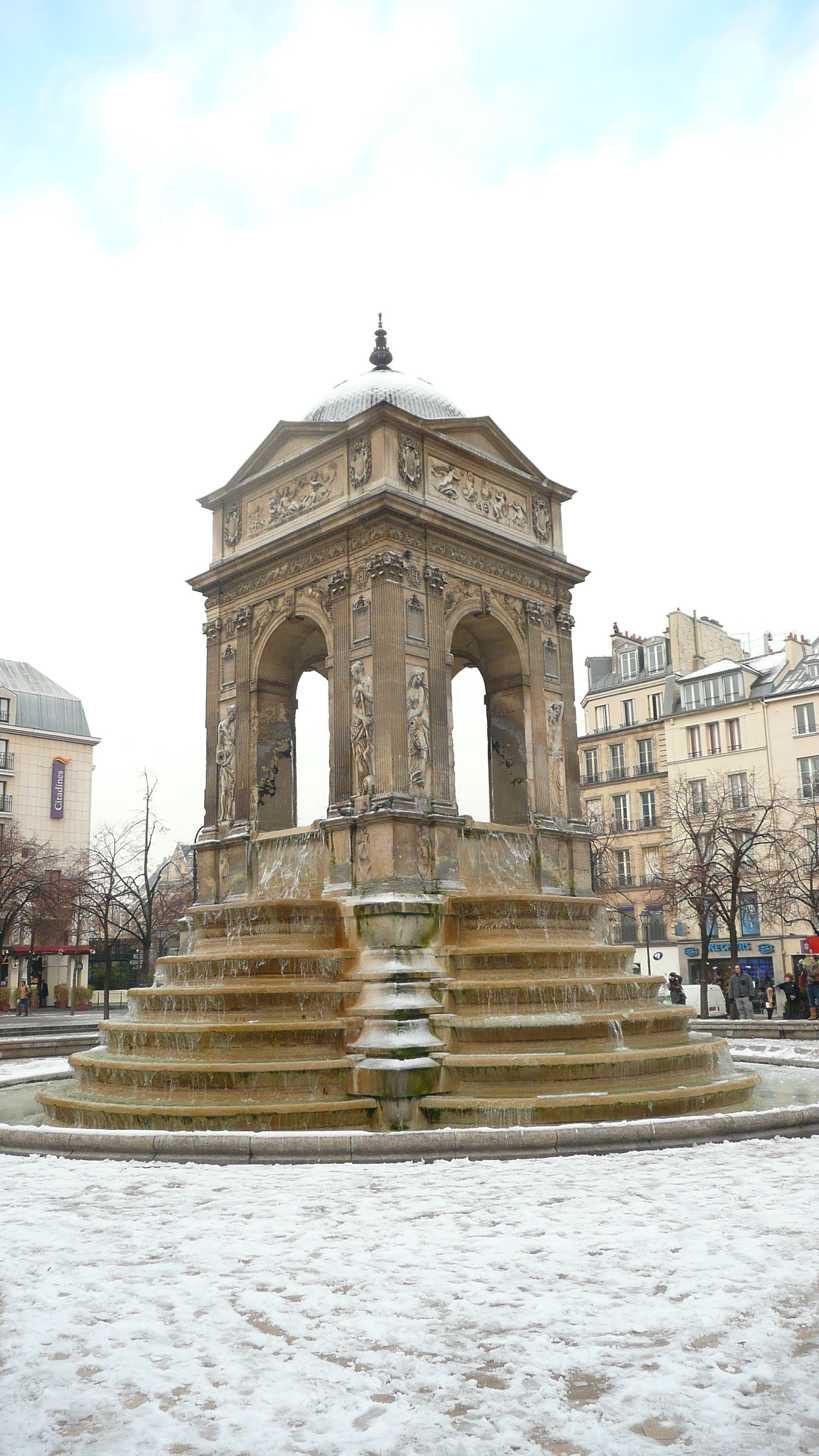
The Fountain of the Innocents in the Place Joachim-du-Bellay

- Passage des Jacobins - formerly the site of the Jacobin convent
- Rue Jean-Jacques-Rousseau - Jean-Jacques Rousseau (1712–1778), philosopher
- Rue Jean-Lantier - corruption of the old name rue Jean-Lointier
- Rue Jean-Tison - Jean Tison, a 13th-century resident
- Place Joachim-du-Bellay - Joachim du Bellay (1522–1560), poet
- Rue du Jour - day
- Allée Jules-Supervielle - Jules Supervielle (1884–1960), poet

== L ==
- Rue de La Sourdière - Monsieur de la Faye, sieur de la Sourdière
- Rue La Feuillade - François d'Aubusson de La Feuillade (1625–1691), Marshal of France
- Rue La Vrillière - The Hotel de la Vrilliere was located nearby.
- Rue des Lavandières-Sainte-Opportune - the washerwomen
- Passerelle Léopold-Sédar-Senghor - Léopold Sédar Senghor (1906–2011), President of Senegal
- Place du Lieutenant-Henri-Karcher - Henri Karcher (1908–1983), member of the French Resistance
- Passage des Lingères - previously the site of the Porte des Lingères
- Rue de la Lingerie - seamstresses
- Rue des Lombards - Lombard moneychangers used to reside there.
- Allée Louis-Aragon - Louis Aragon (1897–1982), poet
- Place du Louvre - the Louvre
- Port du Louvre - the Louvre
- Rue du Louvre - the Louvre

== M ==
- Boulevard de la Madeleine
- Place du Marché-Saint-Honoré
- Rue du Marché-Saint-Honoré
- Rue de Marengo
- Place Marguerite-de-Navarre
- Rue Mauconseil
- Place Maurice-Barrès
- Place Maurice-Quentin
- Quai de la Mégisserie
- Place Mireille
- Rue Molière
- Passage Mondétour
- Rue Mondétour
- Rue de Mondovi
- Rue de la Monnaie
- Rue Montesquieu
- Rue Montmartre
- Rue Montorgueil
- Rue de Montpensier
- Rue du Mont-Thabor
- Rue des Moulins

== N ==
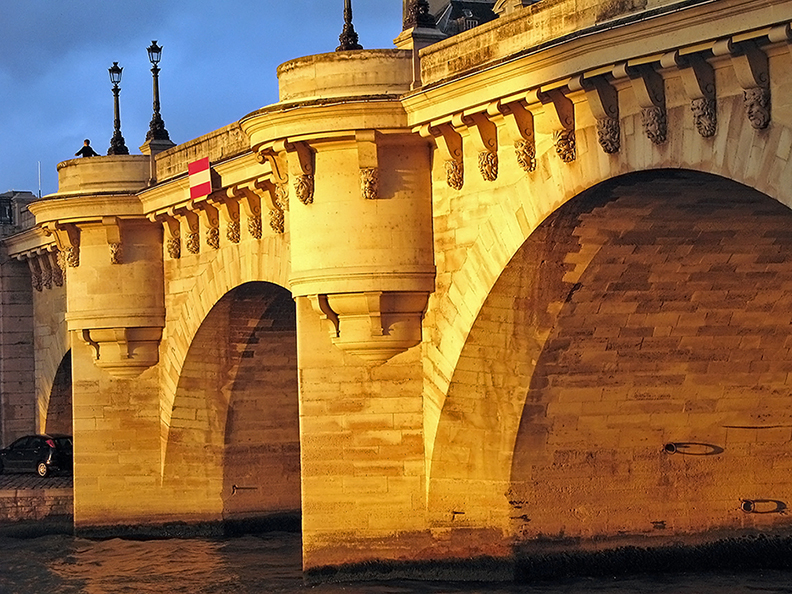
Pont Neuf at Sunset

- Pont Neuf - to distinguish it from bridges built previously

== O ==
- Avenue de l'Opéra
- Rue de l'Oratoire
- Quai des Orfèvres
- Rue des Orfèvres
- Rue de l'Orient-Express

== P ==
- Boulevard du Palais
- Place du Palais-Royal
- Rue du Pélican
- Rue Perrault
- Rue de la Petite-Truanderie
- Rue des Petits-Champs
- Place Pierre-Emmanuel
- Rue Pierre-Lescot
- Rue du Plat-d'Étain
- Place du Pont-Neuf
- Rue du Pont-Neuf
- Passage Potier
- Rue des Prêcheurs
- Rue des Prêtres-Saint-Germain-l'Auxerrois
- Rue des Prouvaires
- Place des Pyramides
- Rue des Pyramides

== R ==
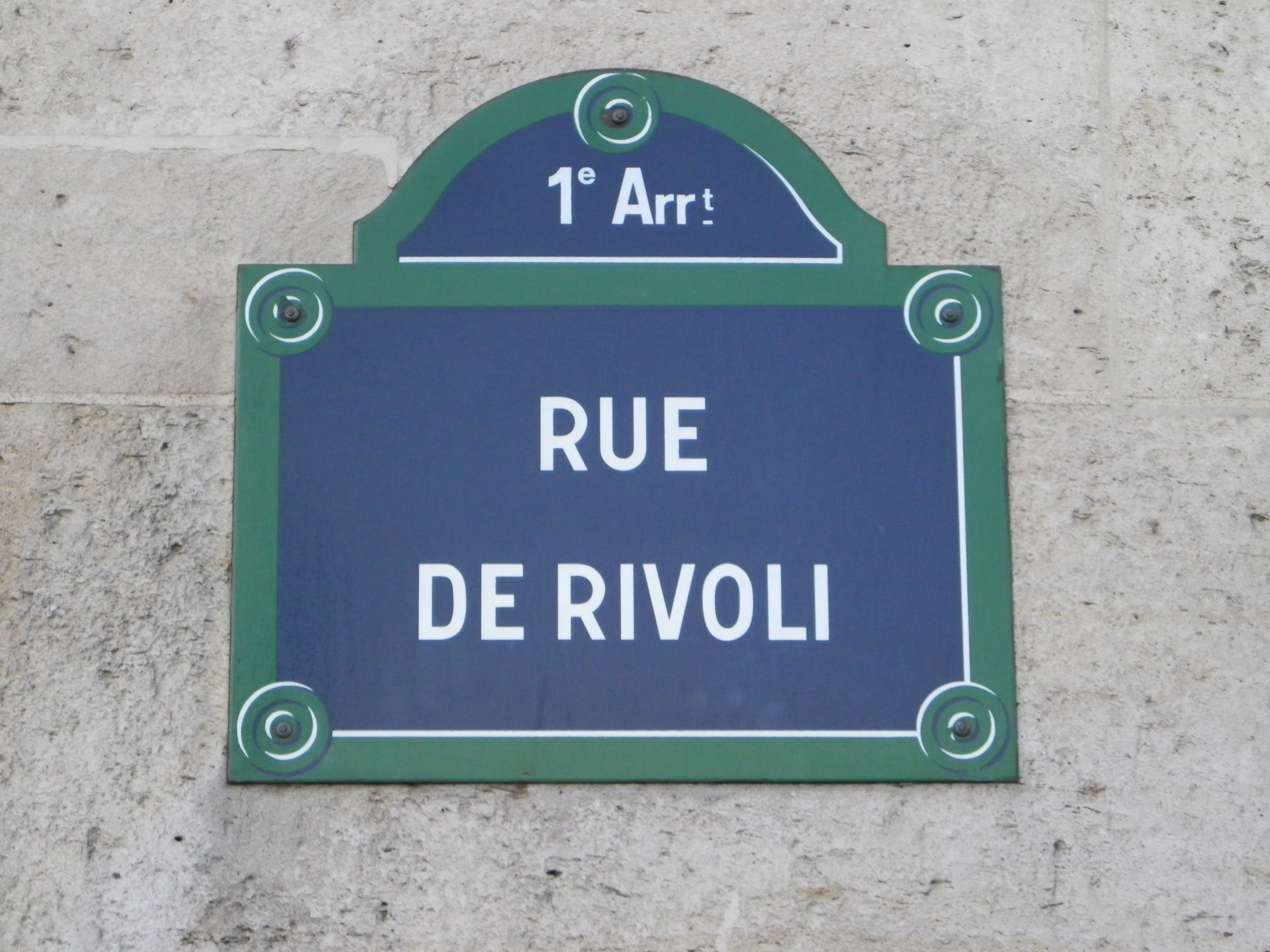
Plaque signifying the Rue de Rivoli

- Rue Radziwill
- Rue Rambuteau
- Passage de la Reine-de-Hongrie
- Place René-Cassin
- Rue de La Reynie
- Passage de Richelieu
- Rue de Richelieu
- Rue de Rivoli
- Rue de Rohan
- Rue Rouget-de-L'Isle
- Rue du Roule
- Pont Royal

== S ==
- Rue Saint-Denis
- Rue Sainte-Anne
- Place Sainte-Opportune
- Rue Sainte-Opportune
- Impasse Saint-Eustache
- Rue Saint-Florentin
- Rue Saint-Germain-l'Auxerrois
- Rue Saint-Honoré
- Rue Saint-Hyacinthe
- Allée Saint-John-Perse
- Pont Saint-Michel
- Passage Saint-Roch
- Rue Saint-Roch
- Rue Sauval
- Boulevard de Sébastopol

== T ==
- Rue Thérèse
- Impasse des Trois-Visages
- Port des Tuileries
- Quai des Tuileries
- Rue de Turbigo

== V ==
- Place de Valois
- Rue de Valois
- Rue Vauvilliers
- Cour Vendôme
- Place Vendôme
- Rue de Ventadour
- Passage Vérité
- Galerie Véro-Dodat
- Rue de Viarmes
- Place des Victoires
- Avenue Victoria
- Rue Villedo
- Rue du Vingt-Neuf-Juillet
- Galerie Vivienne
- Rue Vivienne
- Rue Volney

== Bibliography ==
- Lazare, Félix; Lazare, Louis Clément (1844). Dictionnaire administratif et historique des rues de Paris et de ses monuments (in French). Paris: F. Lazare. "Dictionnaire administratif et historique des rues de Paris et de ses monuments."
- "Recherche des rues de Paris" [Search the streets of Paris]. Paris.fr (in French). Mairie de Paris.
