= Quai Aimé-Césaire =

Street in 1st arrondissement of Paris, France

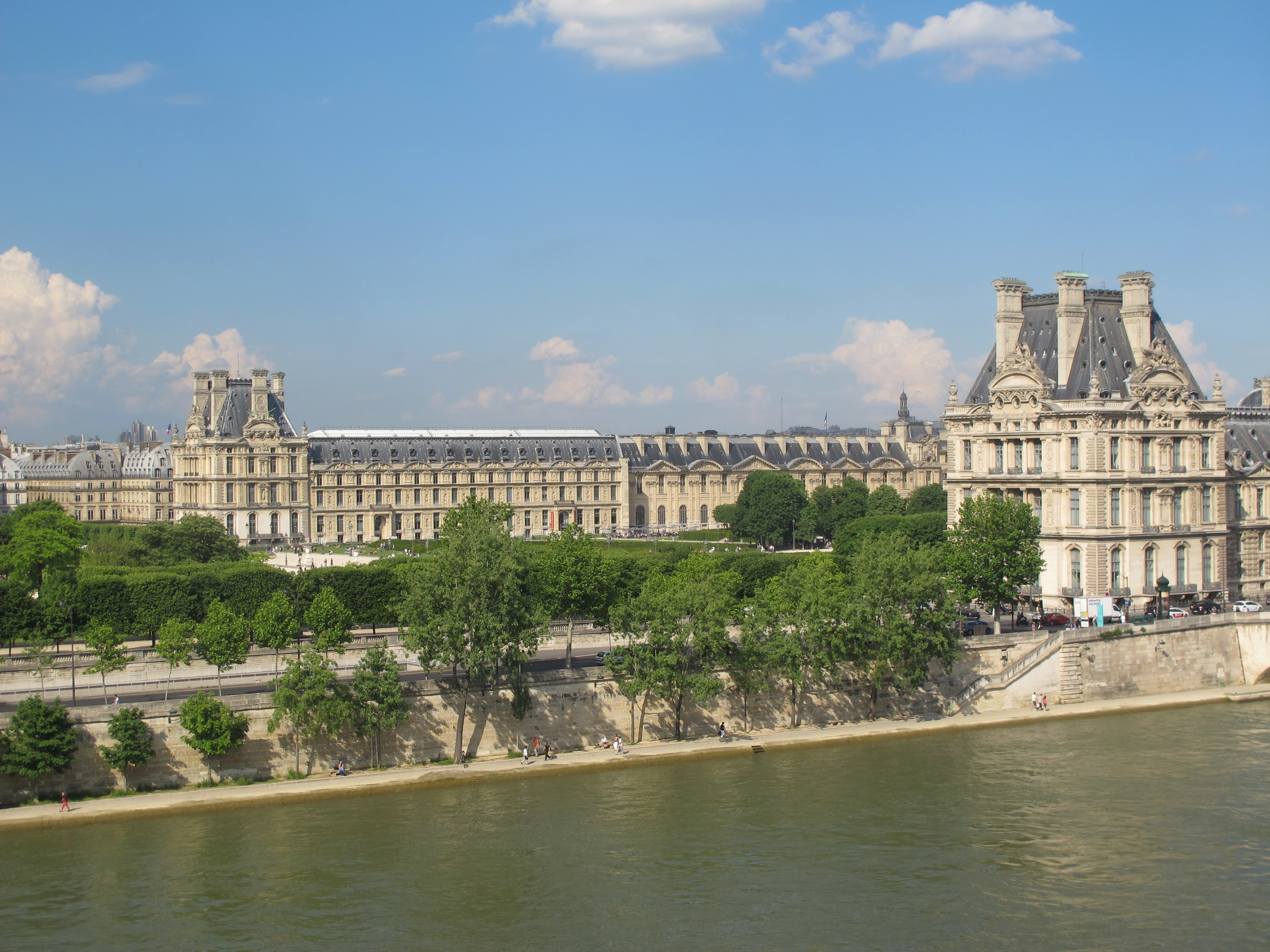
- Quai Aimé-Césaire and the Louvre seen from the Rive Gauche

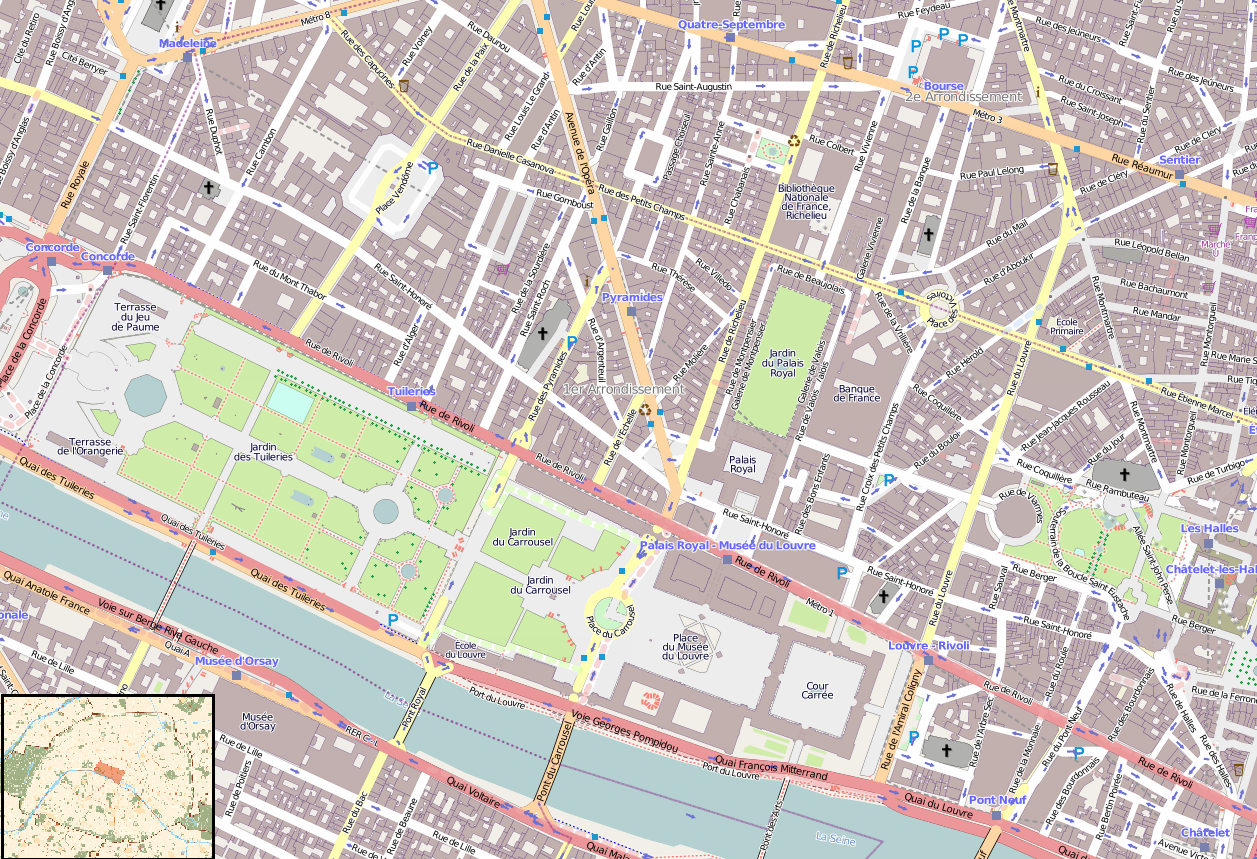
- Location within 1st arrondissement of Paris Location within Paris
- Former name: Partie du quai des Tuileries
- Namesake: Aimé Césaire
- Type: Quay
- Length: 400 m (1,300 ft)
- Width: 22 m
- Location: Paris
- Arrondissement: 1st arrondissement of Paris
- Coordinates: 48.861628°N 2.328024°E
- From: Quai François-Mitterrand, Avenue du Général-Lemonnier
- To: Quai des Tuileries, Passerelle Léopold-Sédar-Senghor

Construction
- Inauguration: 26 June 2013

The Quai Aimé-Césaire is a quay on the right bank of the Seine in the 1st arrondissement of Paris, France.

== Location ==
The quay is entirely located between the Seine and the Tuileries Garden. The vehicles can drive on the quay from west to east only.

The quay is served by station Tuileries of Métro Line 1, as well as by RATP Bus Lines 24 and 72 and Noctilien Lines 11 and 24.

== History ==
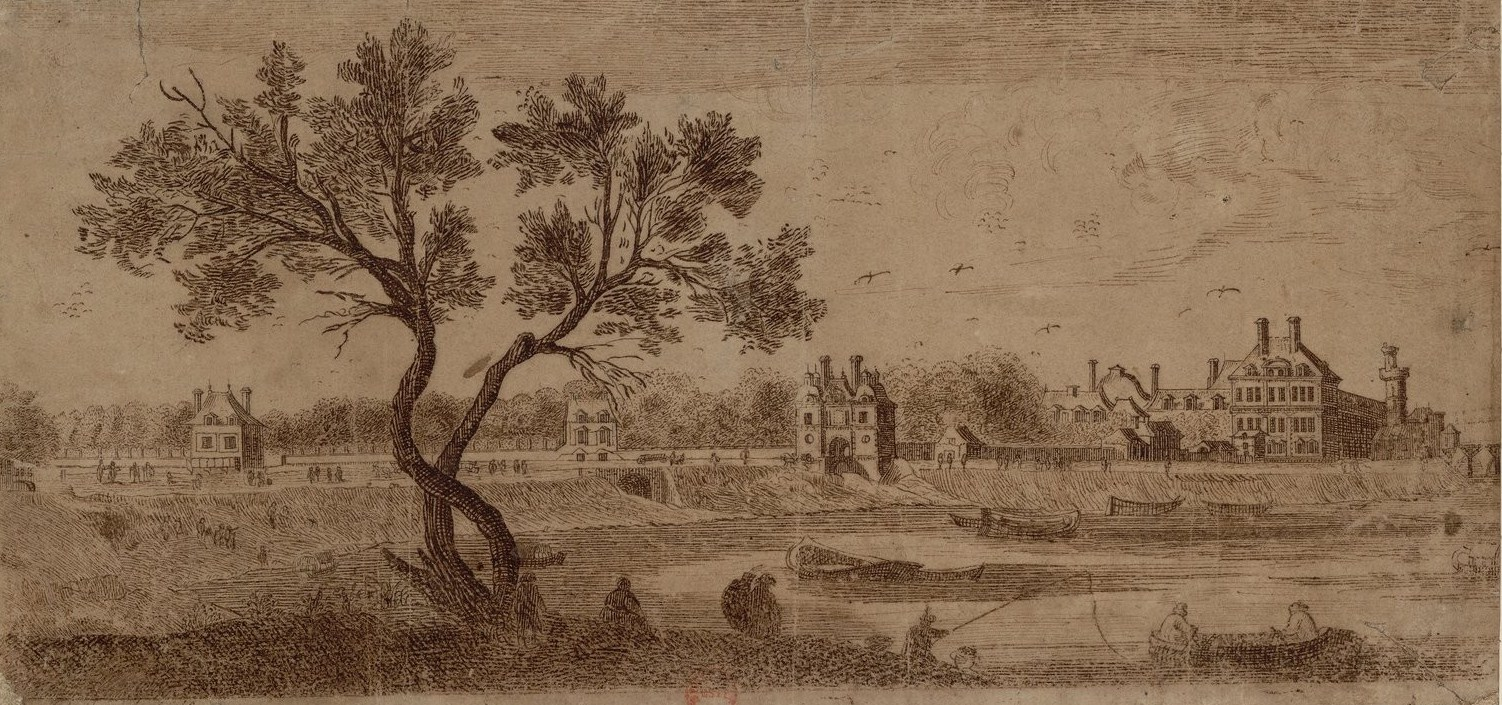
Embankments of the Tuileries before the 17th century

Until the First French Empire, the path on the southern boundary of the Tuileries Garden was a dirt track. It was paved in 1806.

The quay was inaugurated under its current name on 26 June 2013 on a former part of the Quai des Tuileries. Its name referring to Martinican poet, author and politician Aimé Césaire was chosen by the Paris Municipal Council in March 2013.

== See also ==
- List of streets in the 1st arrondissement of Paris
