= Poquelin =

Poquelin is a surname. Notable people with the surname include:

- Jean-Baptiste Poquelin (1622–1673), French playwright, actor, and poet
  - Collège Jean-Baptiste-Poquelin
