= Tunnel des Tuileries =

Tunnel in Paris, France

Coordinates: 48°51′34″N 2°20′08″E

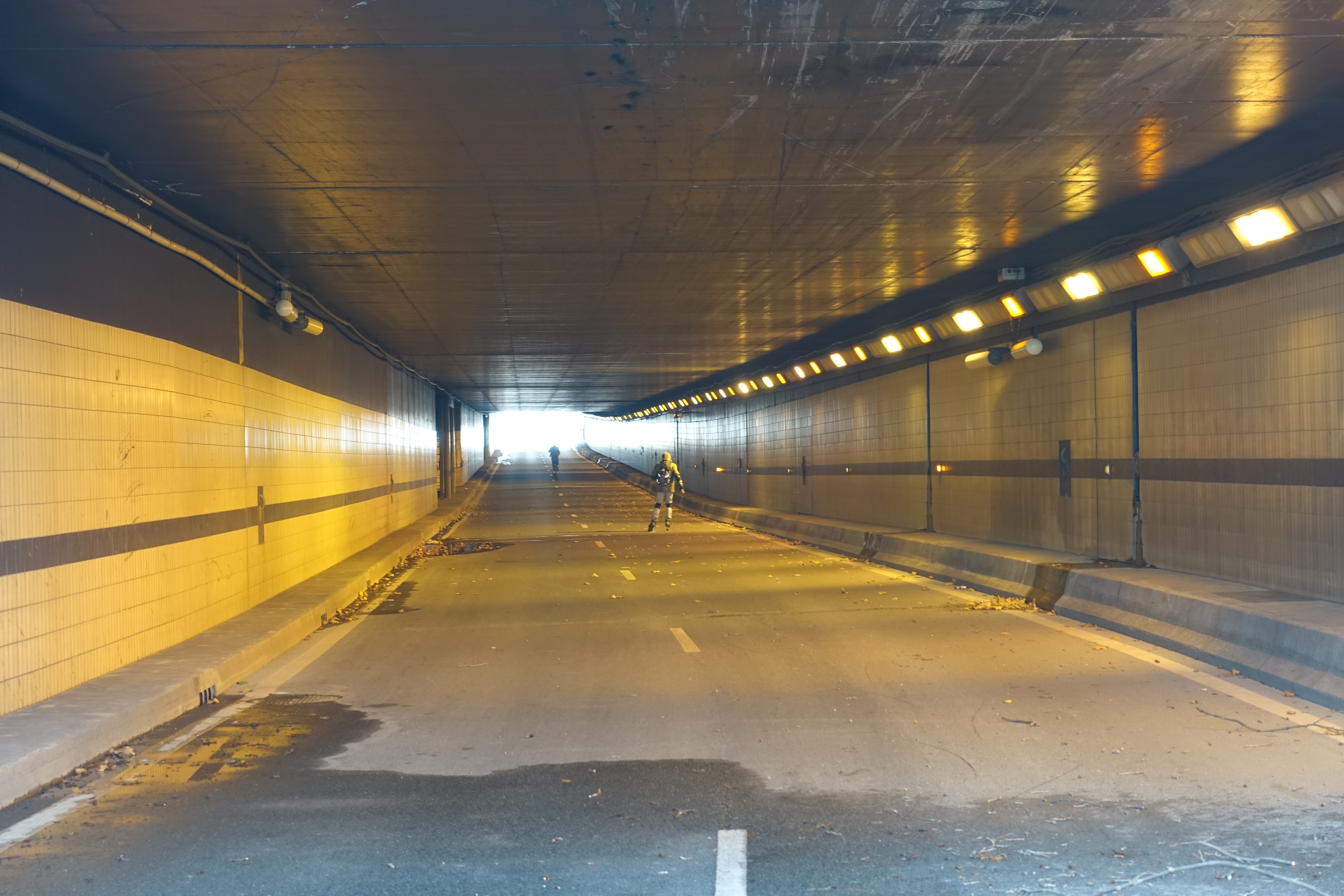
- Interactive map of Tunnel des Tuileries

Overview
- Location: Paris, France
- Start: Voie Georges-Pompidou
- End: Quai des Tuileries

Operation
- Opened: 1967

Technical
- Length: 861 m

The Tunnel des Tuileries is a tunnel parallel to the Seine at the Quai des Tuileries close to Louvre. Today, the 861 m long tunnel is reserved for pedestrians and bicycles. When it opened in 1967, it was used for one-way traffic from West to East as an integral part of Voie Georges-Pompidou.

In July 2022, colorful lights were installed and artists have painted several huge frescos inside the tunnel.
