= Jeanne Weber =

French serial killer

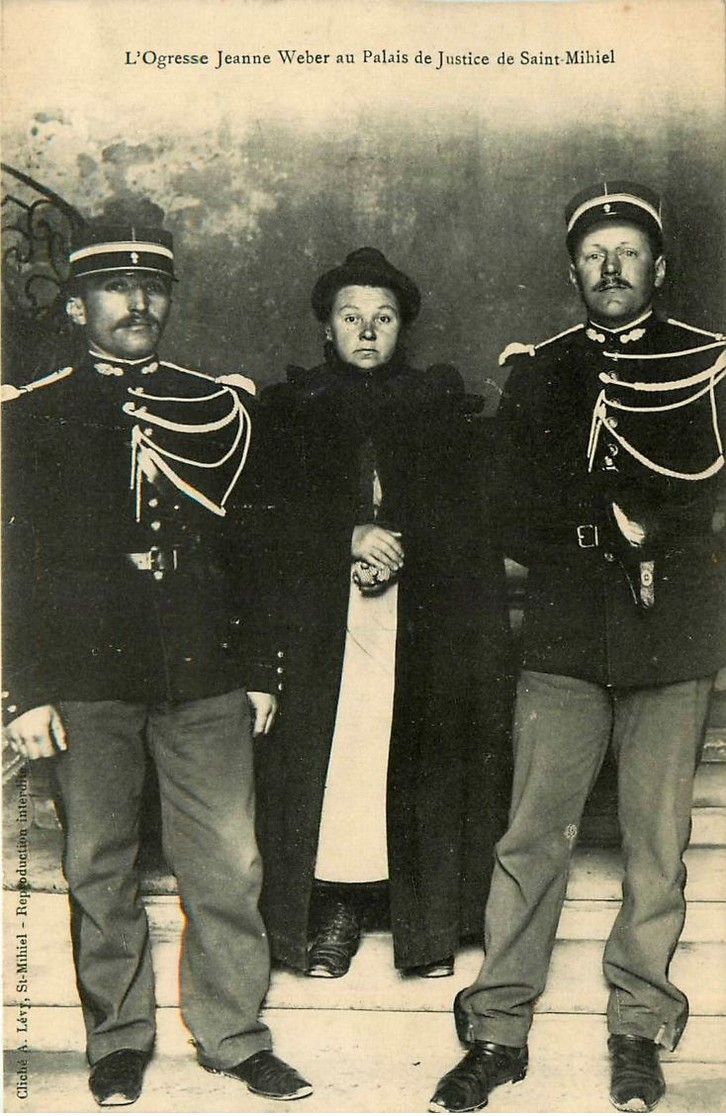
- Jeanne Weber (1908)
- Born: Jeanne Weber; 7 October 1874; France
- Died: 5 July 1918 (aged 43)
- Other name: The Ogress
- Conviction: Murder
- Penalty: Not guilty by reason of insanity

Details
- Victims: 10
- Span of crimes: 2 March 1905 – 8 May 1908
- Country: France
- Date apprehended: 8 May 1908

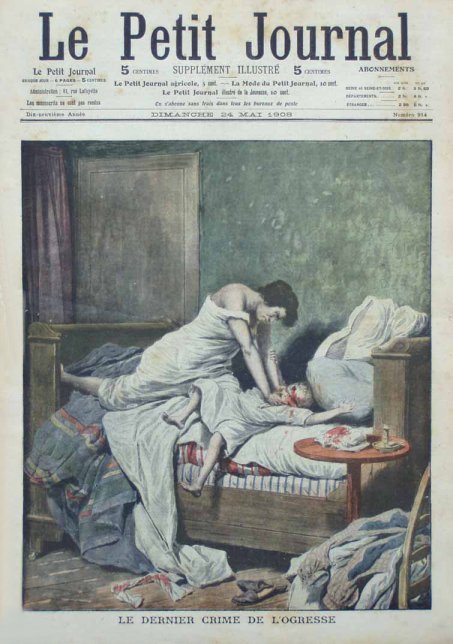
Cover of Le Petit Journal, 24 May 1908. Jeanne Weber murders a child

Jeanne Weber (7 October 1874 – 5 July 1918) was a French serial killer. She strangled at least 10 children, including her own. She was both convicted of murder and declared insane in 1908; she hanged herself ten years later.

== Early life ==
Weber was born in a small fishing village in western France, which she left for Paris at age 14, working various menial jobs until she married in 1893. Her husband was an alcoholic, and two of their three children died in 1905. By then, Weber, residing in a seedy Paris tenement with her husband and their seven-year-old son, was also drinking heavily.

== Murders ==
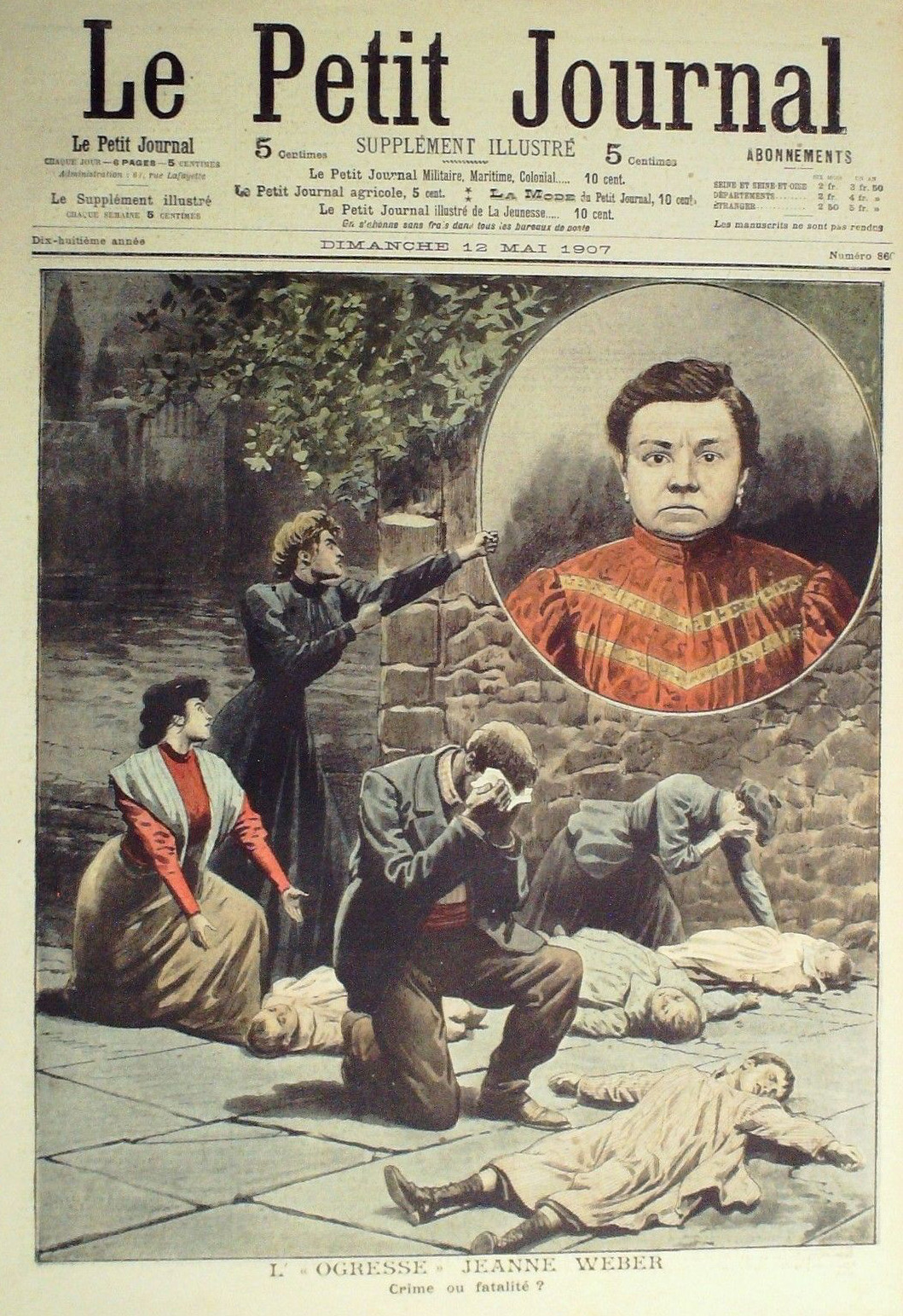
Cover of Le Petit Journal, 12 May 1907. Portrait of Jeanne Weber

On 2 March 1905, Weber was babysitting for her sister-in-law when one of the woman's two daughters — 18-month-old Georgette — suddenly "fell ill" and died. Strange bruises on her neck were ignored by the examining physician, and Weber was welcomed back to babysit on 11 March. Two-year-old Suzanne did not survive the visit, but a doctor blamed the second death on unexplained "convulsions”.

On 25 March, Weber was babysitting her brother's seven-year-old daughter, Germaine, when the girl suffered a sudden attack of "choking” complete with red marks on her throat. The child survived that episode but she was less fortunate the following day when Weber returned. Diphtheria was blamed for her death, and for that of Weber's son, Marcel, just four days later. Once again, the tell-tale marks of strangulation were ignored.

On 5 April 1905, Weber invited two of her sisters-in-law to dinner, and remained home with her 10-year-old nephew, Maurice, while the other women went out shopping. They returned prematurely to find Maurice gasping on the bed, his throat mottled with bruises and Jeanne standing over him with a crazed expression on her face. Charges were filed and Weber's trial opened on 29 January 1906, with the prosecution alleging eight murders, including all three of Weber's own children and two others — Lucie Aleandre and Marcel Poyatos — who had died while in her care. It was alleged that Weber killed her son in March to throw suspicion off herself, but she was being defended by a brilliant defence lawyer, Henri-Robert, and jurors were reluctant to believe the worst about a grieving mother. She was acquitted on 6 February.

Fourteen months later, on 7 April 1907, a physician from the town of Villedieu was summoned to the home of a peasant named Bavouzet. He was greeted at the door by a babysitter, "Madame Moulinet”, who led him to the cot where nine-year-old Auguste Bavouzet lay dead, his throat badly bruised. The cause of death was listed as "convulsions”, but the doctor changed his opinion on 4 May, when "Madame Moulinet" was identified as Jeanne Weber. Weber engaged the lawyer, Henri-Robert, once more. Held over for trial, Weber was released in December after a second autopsy blamed the boy's death on typhoid.

Weber quickly dropped from sight, surfacing next as an orderly at a children's hospital in Faucombault, moving on from there to the Children's Home in Orgeville, run by friends who sought to "make up for the wrongs that justice has inflicted upon an innocent woman”. Working as "Marie Lemoine”, Weber had been on the job for less than a week when she was caught strangling a child in the home. The owners quietly dismissed her and the incident was covered up.

Back in Paris, Weber was arrested for vagrancy and briefly confined to the asylum at Nanterre, but doctors there pronounced her sane and set her free. She drifted into prostitution, picking up a common-law husband along the way. On 8 May 1908, the couple settled at an inn in Commercy. A short time later, Weber was found strangling the innkeeper's son, 10-year-old Marcel Poirot, with a bloody handkerchief. The father had to punch her three times in the face before she would release the lifeless body.

== Death ==
Held for trial on murder charges, Weber was declared insane on 25 October 1908, and was packed off to the asylum at Mareville. Credited with at least ten murders, she survived ten years in captivity before manually strangling herself in 1918.

== See also ==
- List of serial killers by number of victims
