= Thérèse Humbert =

French fraudster

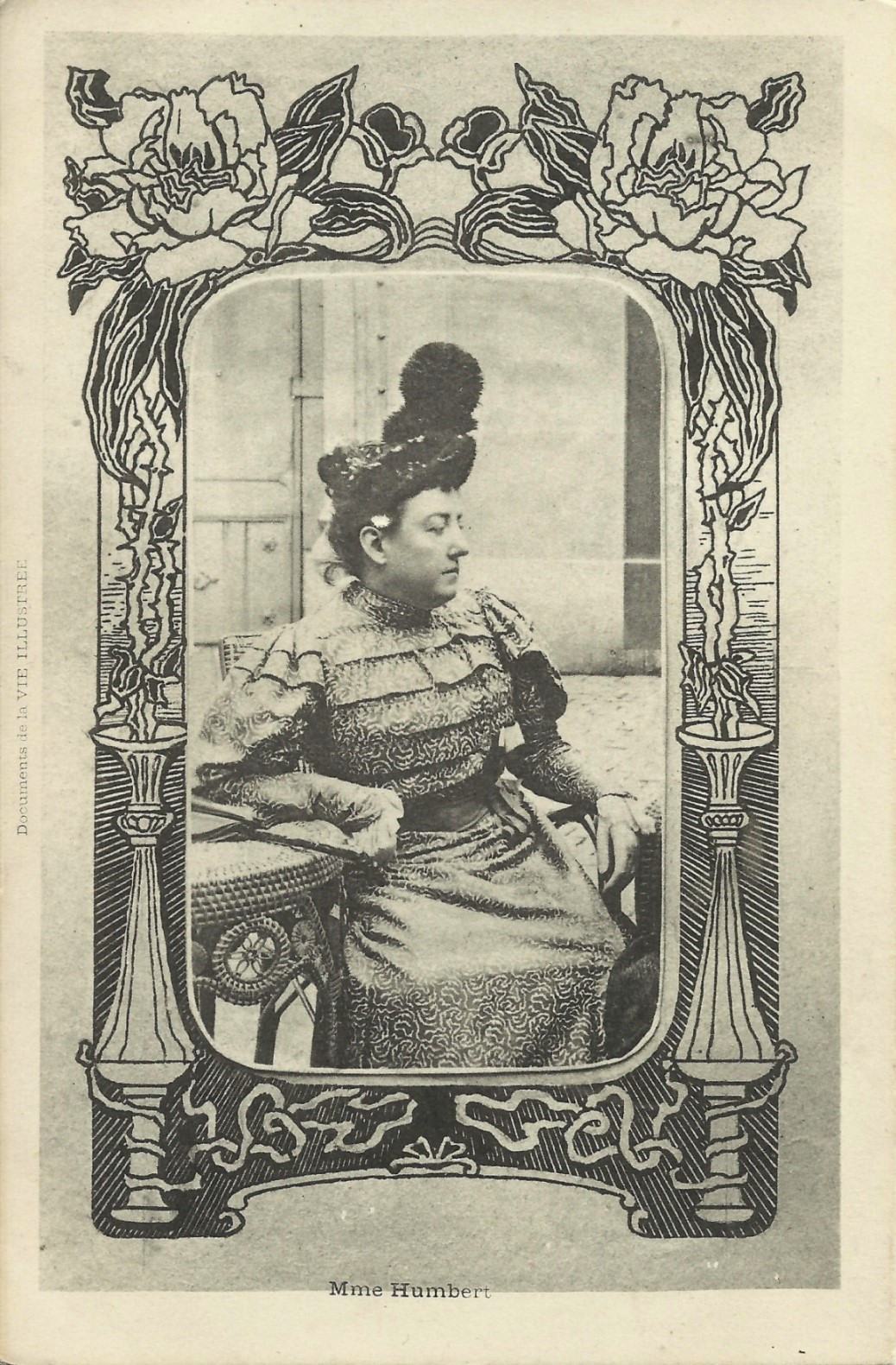
Humbert about 1903

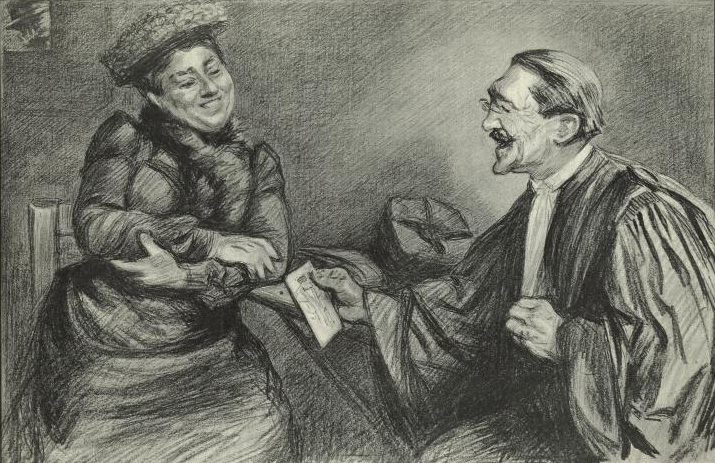
Humbert and her lawyer, Henri-Robert, from a drawing by French illustrator Paul Renouard circa 1903

Thérèse Humbert (1856–after 1936) was a French female fraudster, who pretended to be an heir of an imaginary American millionaire named Robert Crawford.

== Biography ==
=== Early life ===
Humbert was born Thérèse Daurignac, a peasant girl in Aussonne, Midi-Pyrénées, France. Her father Guillaume Daurignac was a foundling whose mother Jeanne Daurignac legally recognized very late. Later, Guillaume married Rose-Lucie Capella, who was 25 years younger than him, and they had seven children, among them Thérèse.

Guillaume claimed to be the hidden son of a noblewoman who bequeathed him all her properties, showing old parchments as evidence.

As a child, Thérèse once convinced her friends to pool their jewelry so that they could fool their future boyfriends into believing they were wealthy.

=== Meeting with Fréderic Humbert ===
She married Frédéric Humbert, son of the mayor of Toulouse Gustave Humbert, a famous jurist, law teacher and statesman. In order to convince her parents-in-law to accept their marriage, Thérèse claimed to be the sole heir of a cousin who was an old maid owning a castle in the Gers. Although the lie was finally revealed, Fréderic was still taken by her cool.

=== The Crawford fraud ===
Humbert claimed that in 1879, when she was in a train, she heard groans from the next compartment. She entered into it by climbing along the outside of the train. There she found a man who was having a heart attack. When she had helped him with her smelling salts, the man told her he was an American millionaire named Robert Henry Crawford, and that he was eternally grateful and would reward her some day. Two years later in 1881, she received a letter stating that Crawford had died and made her beneficiary of his will. However, she also added that Crawford's two nephews Henry and Robert contested the testament and had produced another will which made them Crawford's sole heirs. Thérèse finally concluded by claiming that the documents and the bearer bonds proving the existence of this inheritance were stored in her safe.

With this story, Humbert obtained a huge loan using the supposed inheritance as a collateral. She moved to Paris with her husband and bought an elaborate house in Avenue de la Grande Armée. In order to keep her story credible, she hired solicitors and barristers to sue the nephews in courts, obtaining several rulings, including from the Court of Cassation, to bolster her claims about the reality of the will.

Humbert gathered much influence, fame and wealth. Her salon became a center of socializing. Humbert and her associates, other members of the Humbert family, borrowed money against the nonexistent inheritance. They lived in luxury for about 20 years, spending their money on flowers, elaborate dresses and banquets. Among those she invited were Georges Ernest Boulanger, Louis Lépine, Félix Faure and Proust.

Eventually they had to borrow more money to cover the previous loans. There were suspicions, but nobody was able to prove the story false, especially since the Humberts arranged to pay off disquieted investors, and passed two of the brothers of Thérèse off as the Crawford nephews.

=== Discovery of the fraud ===
In 1883, Le Matin newspaper published a skeptical article, but Humbert's father-in-law, who at the time was the minister of justice, supported her story. Humbert claimed that the Crawfords had sued her so that she would have to place her part of the inheritance to Crédit Lyonnais bank. After lengthy litigation, during which the two brothers passing themselves as the Crawford nephews appeared in court, the court ruled that the locked safe should remain in Humbert's possession.

When Jules Bizat, official for the French bank, asked Humbert how she had invested her money, she claimed that it was in government bonds. Bizat checked and found that it was not the case. Humbert had organized a generous pension plan she had named Rente Viagère to get more money and used it to pay her debts and buy bonds.

Eventually the creditors noticed that the supposed amount of the inheritance would never be able to cover all the loans and legal costs. Le Matin demanded that the safe should be opened. In 1901, Humbert's creditors sued her, and the next year the Parisian court gave an order that the fabled safe would be opened to prove the existence of the money. The safe was found nearly empty, containing only old newspapers, a trouser button and an Italian coin.

=== Justice ===
The scandal rocked the French financial world, and thousands of smaller creditors and investors were ruined. The in-laws of the painter Henri Matisse, M. and Mme. Parayre, became scapegoats in the affair. Matisse's mother-in-law, who was the Humbert family's housekeeper, fell under suspicion, and her husband was arrested. Matisse's studio was searched by detectives, and his wife's family found themselves menaced by angry mobs of fraud victims. M. Parayre eventually went on hunger strike in an attempt to clear his name, with Matisse acting in lieu of a lawyer.

The Humberts had already fled the country, but they were arrested in Madrid in December 1902. Thérèse Humbert was tried and sentenced to five years' hard labor. Her two brothers, who had masqueraded as Crawford's nephews, were sentenced to two and three years each. Her husband Frédèric was also sentenced to five years. Her sister Marie, daughter Eve and deceased father-in-law, the justice minister Gustave Humbert, were stated to be victims of the fraud and were thus not prosecuted.

== Aftermath ==
=== Purported emigration to the USA ===
The generally held theory is that when Thérèse Humbert was released from prison, she emigrated to the United States and that she died in Chicago in 1918. People whom she had defrauded remained mostly silent to avoid further embarrassment.

=== Rumors of her remaining in France ===
Most sources repeat that Thérèse emigrated to Chicago where she died. However, in the weekly paper Détective, edition number 79 dated 1 May 1930, there is an article entitled Vingt Ans d'illusionnisme (20 Years of Conjuring'). The article is written by Monsieur J. France who was one of the leading lights in the prosecution against Thérèse Humbert and who went to Madrid to take her back to Paris for trial. The story of the fraud is retold in the article following the death of Romain Daurignac, a brother of Thérèse. In this article, J. France says: 'Thérèse Humbert is still living, poorly, in Paris. She has lost her miraculous vitality. What a reverse of fortune her golden past has left her. She is a quite humble old lady, who never speaks to anyone." (Thérése Humbert vit toujours, petitement, à Paris. Elle a perdu sa miraculeuse vitalité. Quels revers lui a laissés le passé d'or? C'est une vieille femme assez humble, qui ne parle jamais'.) There are also two photos. One of these shows the door to a house in Paris and has underneath the note: 'Here, boulevard des Batignolles, lives to-day, she who was 'la Grande Thérèse'. (Ici, boulevard des batignolles, demeure aujourd'hui celle qui fut 'la Grande Thérèse'.) The note beneath the second photo says: 'Behind these windows with the white curtains, Thérèse Humbert meditates on her past...'. (Derrière ces fenêtres aux rideaux blancs, Thérèse Humbert médite sur son passé...) Her husband died in 1936; he is not listed as a widower.

In 1939, she has been reported to have inherited from her brother.

== Adaptations ==
A French crime drama based on her life was released in 1983, Thérèse Humbert, directed by Marcel Bluwal and written by Jean-Claude Grumberg, with Oscar and Emmy winning actress Simone Signoret as Thérèse Humbert.

The short story "The Safe of Madame Imbert" ("Le Coffre-fort de madame Imbert"), by Maurice Leblanc, published in 1906 and reprinted in Arsène Lupin, Gentleman Burglar in 1907, is a fictionalization of the Humberts’ story, told from the point of view of master thief Arsène Lupin. In this version, the couple’s surname is “Imbert,” and the fictional benefactor is named “Brawford.”
