= Hôtel de Vendôme (place Vendôme, Paris) =

Luxury hotel in Paris, France

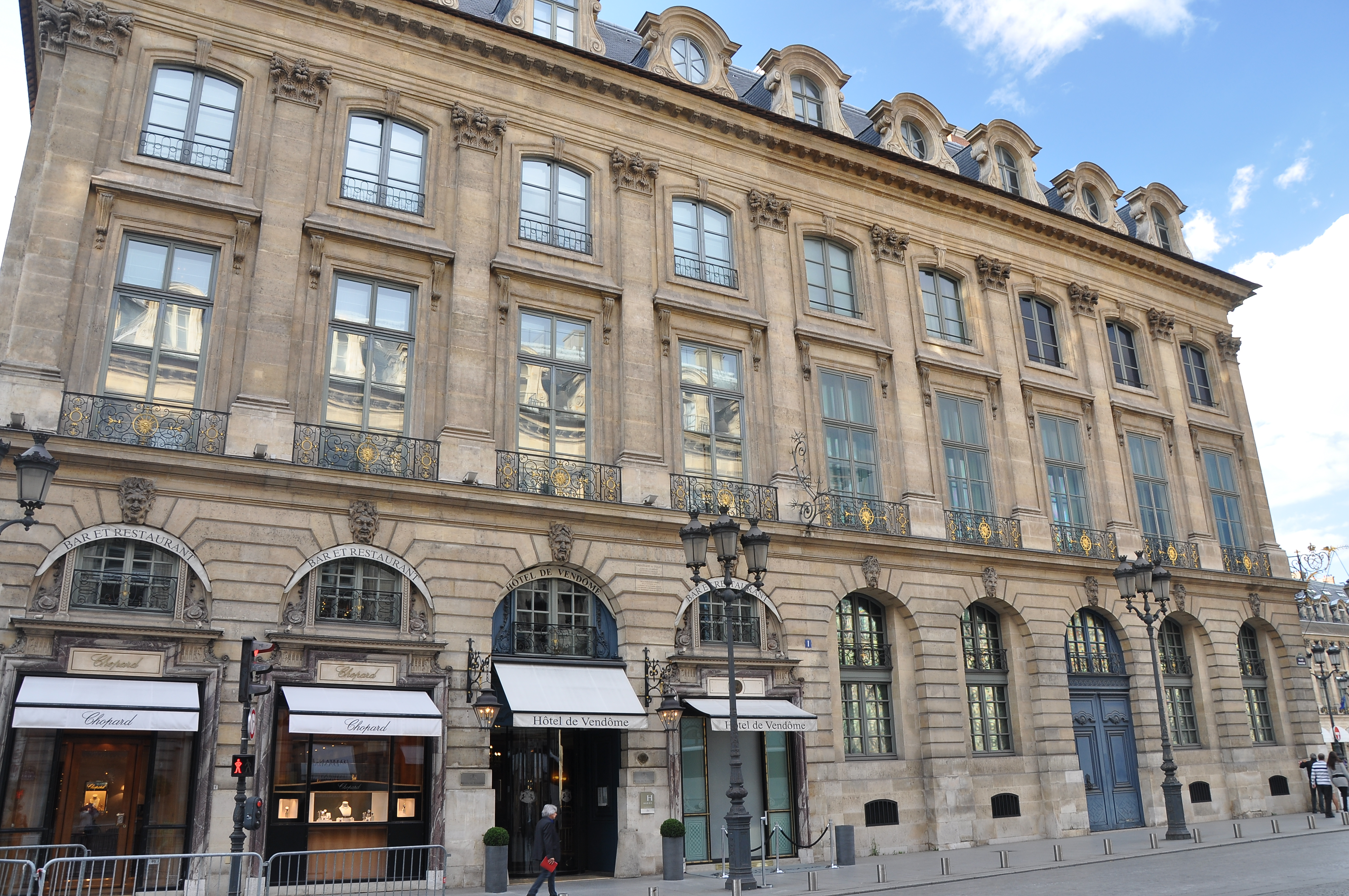
- The façade on Rue Saint-Honoré in 2011

- Location within Paris

General information
- Location: Paris, France, 1 Place Vendôme
- Coordinates: 48°52′0.48″N 2°19′42.68″E
- Opening: 1858; 168 years ago
- Owner: Chopard

Design and construction
- Architects: Jules Hardouin-Mansart; Armand-Claude Mollet

Other information
- Number of rooms: 5
- Number of suites: 10
- Number of restaurants: 1

Website
- www.1-placevendome.com

The Hôtel de Vendôme (French pronunciation: [otɛl d(ə) vɑ̃dom]), also known as 1, Place Vendôme, is a 5-star hotel situated at 1 Place Vendôme in the 1st arrondissement of Paris. Founded in 1858, it is located at the southern entrance to the Place Vendôme, on the northwest corner of the intersection of Rue Saint-Honoré and Rue Place Vendôme.

== History ==
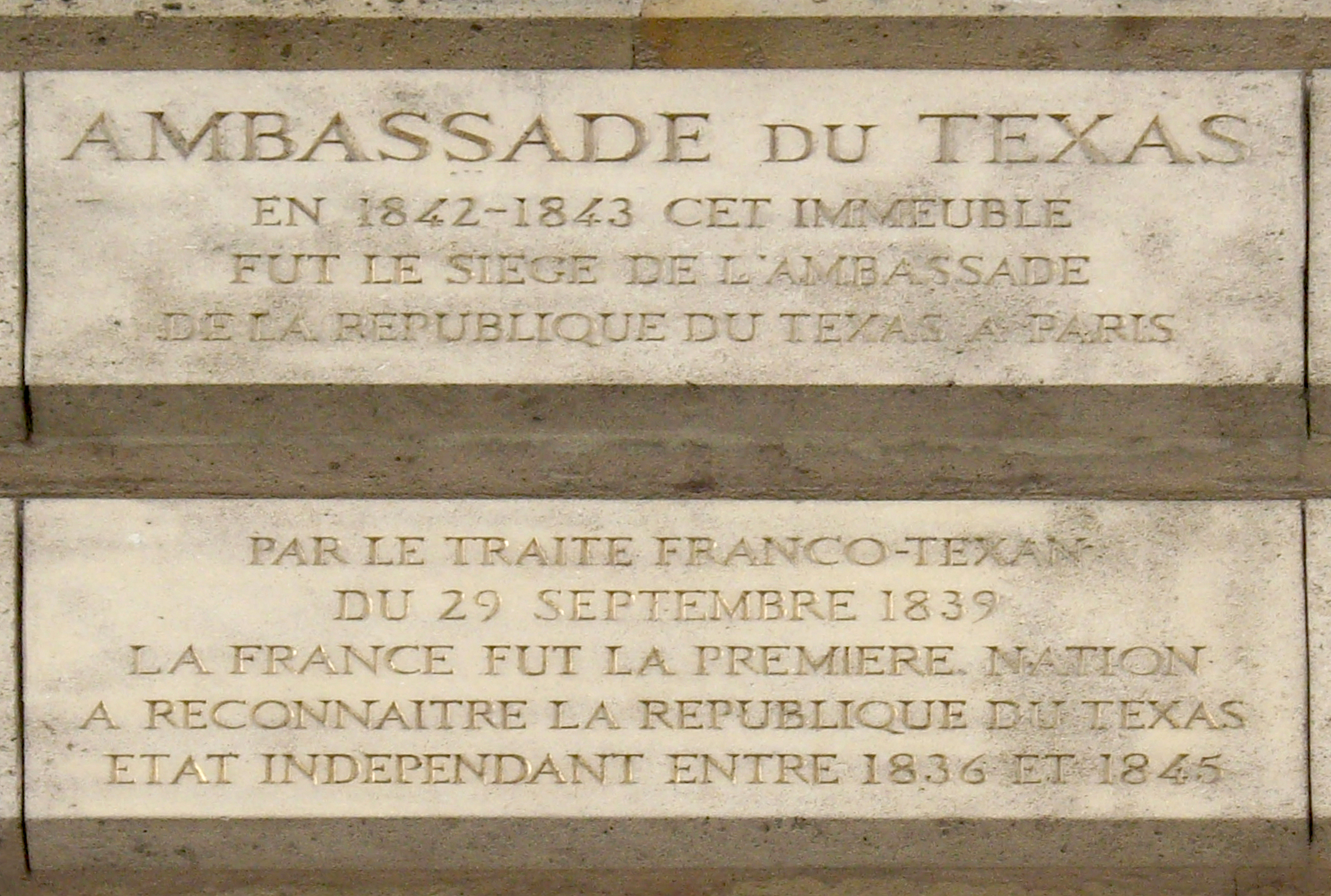
Plaque commemorating the Embassy of the Republic of Texas

The hotel occupies a former hôtel particulier, the Hôtel Batailhe de Francès, built in 1723 by Pierre Perrin, secrétaire du roi, and the architect Armand-Claude Mollet. Constructed behind the uniform façades designed by Jules Hardouin-Mansart for the Place Vendôme, the hôtel itself was designed by Mollet. Perrin lived there until 1729, and in 1736 his heirs sold it to the munitioner and Receiver General of Alsace, Jean Fauste de Batailhe de Francès. It became the Hôtel d'Affry in 1787. From 1842 to 1843, it was the embassy of the Republic of Texas; a plaque to the right of the main entrance commemorates the event. The façade and the roof of the building on the Place Vendôme were classified as monuments historiques on 17 May 1930.

== The hotel ==
The Hôtel Batailhe de Francès was combined with the neighbouring building at 358 Rue Saint-Honoré in the early 19th century, and the merged buildings became a hotel in 1858. In 2004, Chopard, a retailer of luxury watches and jewellery, opened a boutique on the ground floor of the hotel with an entrance on the Rue Saint-Honoré. In 2014 Chopard purchased the entire hotel from its previous owner, the UHP (Union Hôtelière Parisienne). The hotel closed for renovation in 2019 and was scheduled to reopen in autumn 2022. However, the reopening was delayed. It reopened in November 2023. The restoration was done in collaborartion with Pierre-Yves Rochon, and the renovated hotel has 5 rooms and 10 suites.

== Gallery ==
Hôtel de Vendôme in 2011

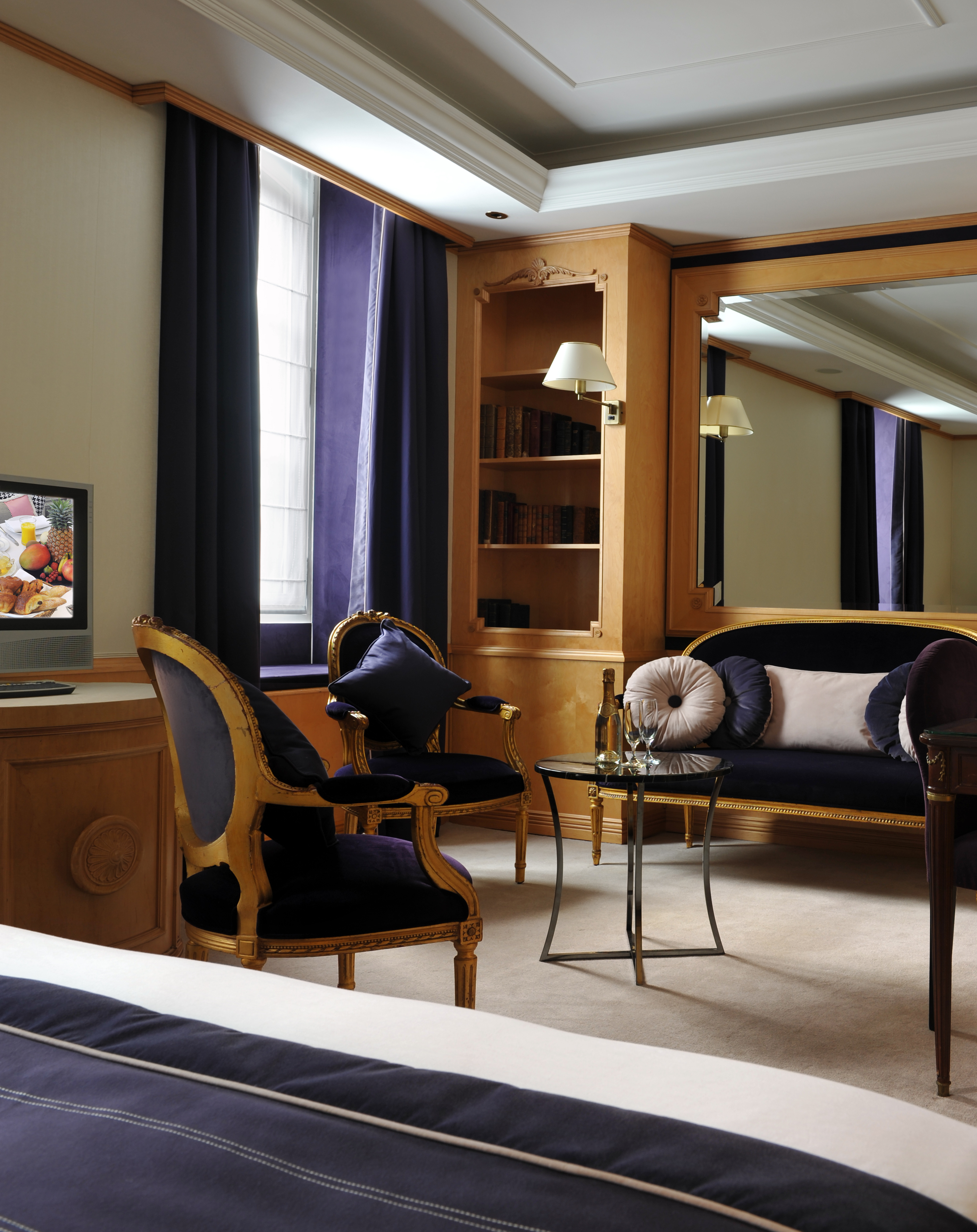
One of the rooms

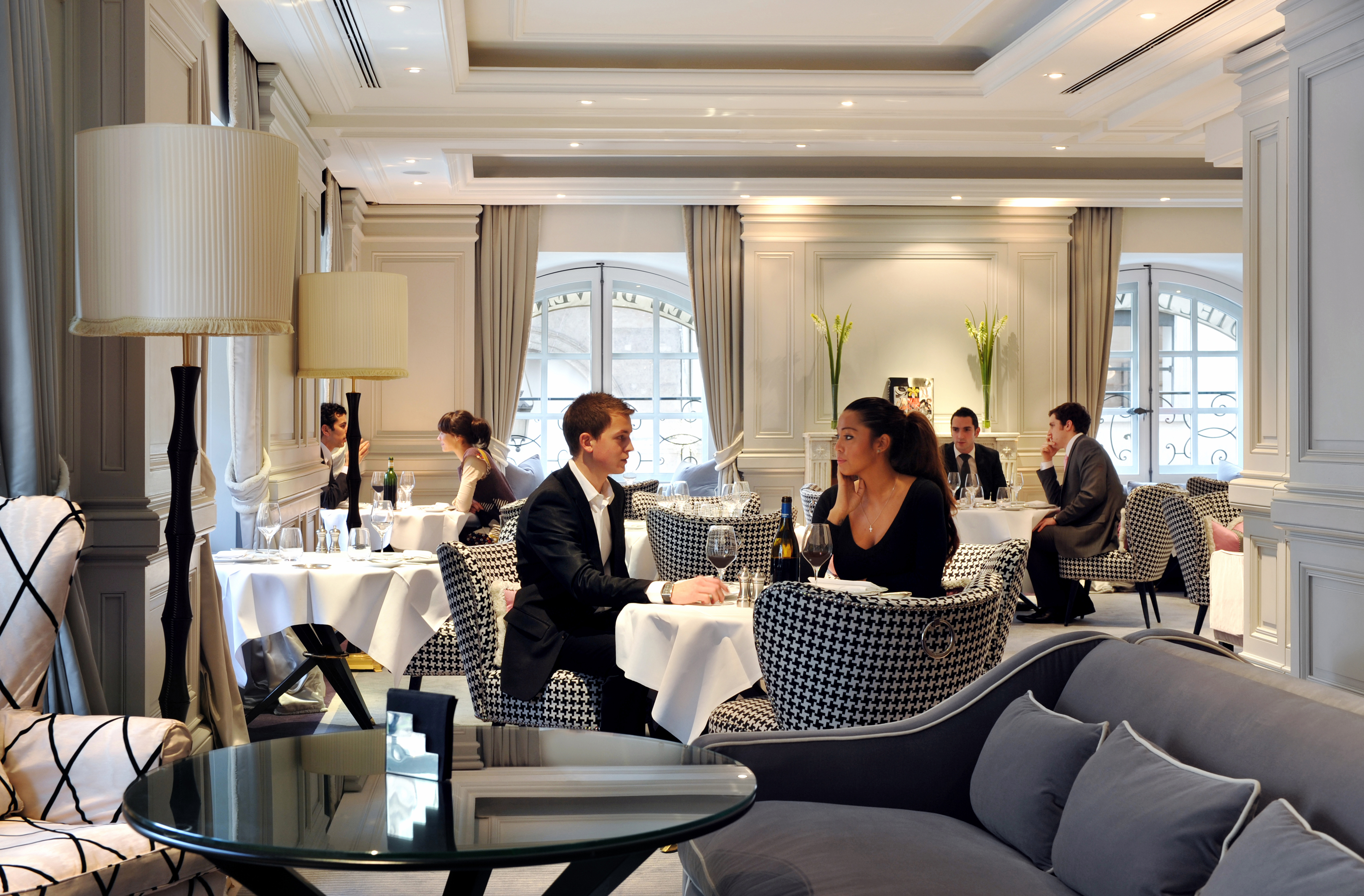
Restaurant

== Bibliography ==
- Ziskin, Rochelle (1999). The Place Vendôme: Architecture and Social Mobility in Eighteenth-Century Paris. Cambridge: Cambridge University Press. ISBN 9780521592598.
