= Rue Basse =

Road in Paris, France

The Rue Basse (French pronunciation: [ʁy bas]) is a road in the 1st arrondissement of Paris, France. The Rue Basse is situated between the Place Carrée on one side and the Place Basse and the Rue des Bons-Vivants on the other side on the -3rd floor of the Forum Central des Halles in the Forum des Halles.

== History ==
It was created during the development of the Forum Central des Halles sector in the Forum des Halles.

The Rue Basse got its name on 18 December 1996.
