= Port du Louvre =

Walkway in Paris, France

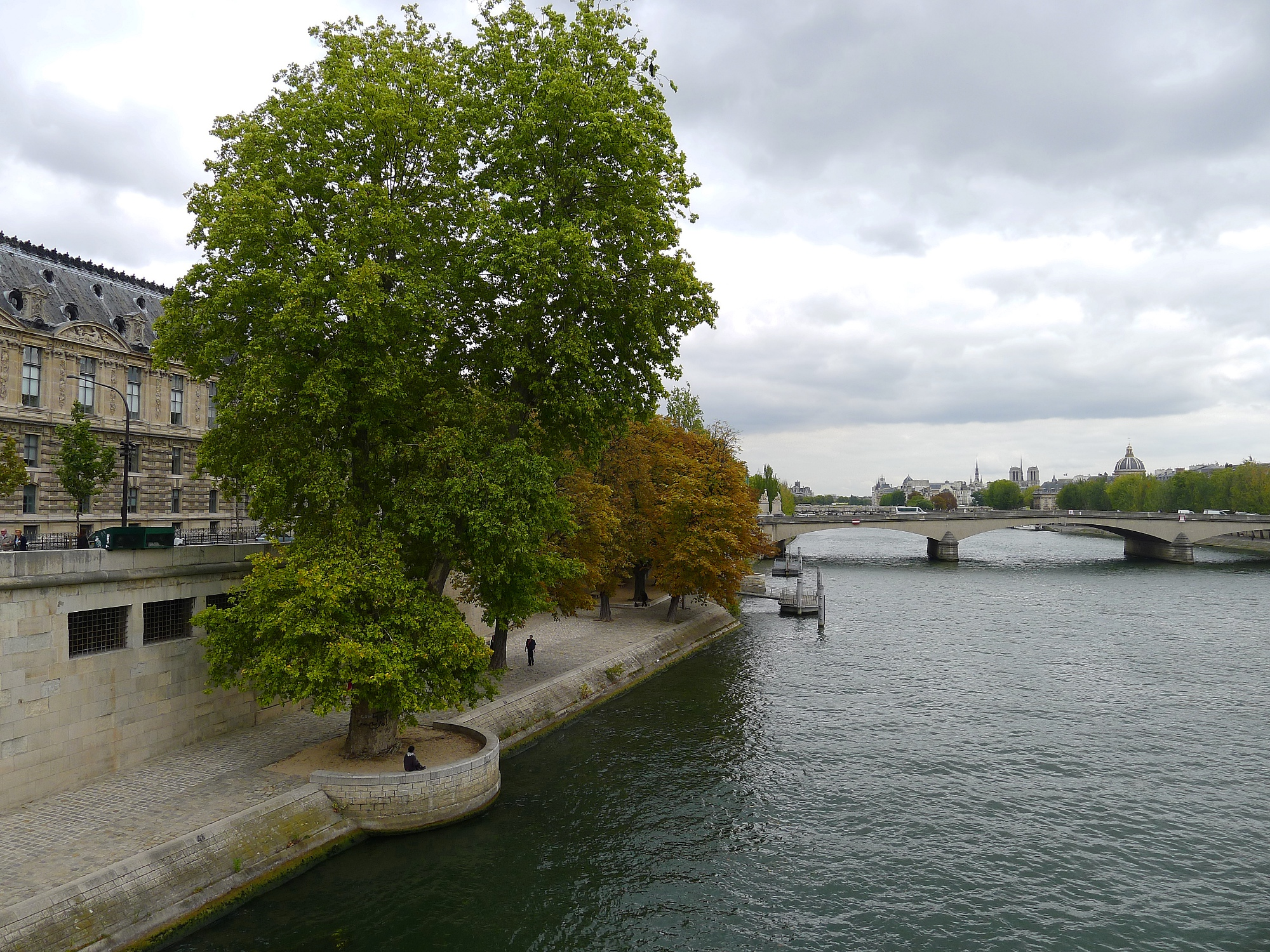

- Location within Paris
- Arrondissement: 1st
- Coordinates: 48.8595°N 2.335°E

The Port du Louvre (French pronunciation: [pɔʁ dy luvʁ]) is a walkway running along the River Seine (on the "right bank") immediately to the south of the Louvre in Paris, France. It is parallel to and lower than the larger Voie Georges Pompidou road between it and the Louvre.

The Port du Louvre is on the Arago route (the Paris Meridian) that runs north-south through Paris, named in honour of the French astronomer and politician François Arago. A bronze Arago plaque can be found embedded in the paving of the Port du Louvre. This is one of 135 bronze medallions installed in 1994 by the Dutch conceptual artist, Jan Dibbets.

Boats for river trips stop at the Port du Louvre.
