= Rue d'Argenteuil =

Street in Paris, France

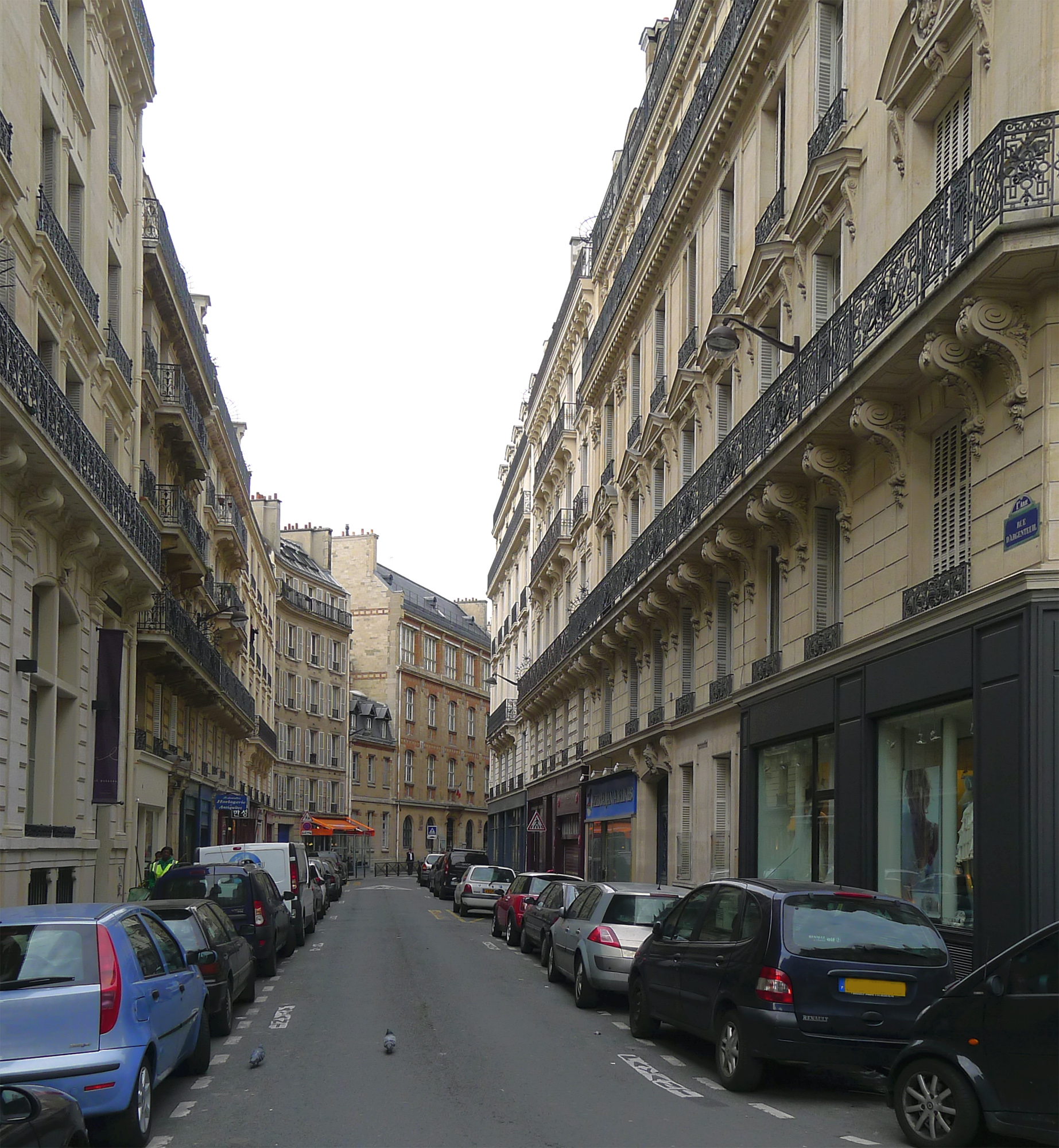

- Location within Paris
- Length: 284 m (932 ft)
- Width: 12 m (39 ft)
- Arrondissement: 1st
- Quarter: Palais-Royal Quarter
- Coordinates: 48°51′55″N 2°20′02″E
- From: 7 rue de l'Échelle
- To: 32 rue Saint-Roch

The Rue d'Argenteuil (French pronunciation: [ʁy daʁʒɑ̃tœj]) is a street in the 1st arrondissement of Paris.

== History ==
Pierre Corneille died in this street.
