= Rue Mondétour =

Street in Paris, France

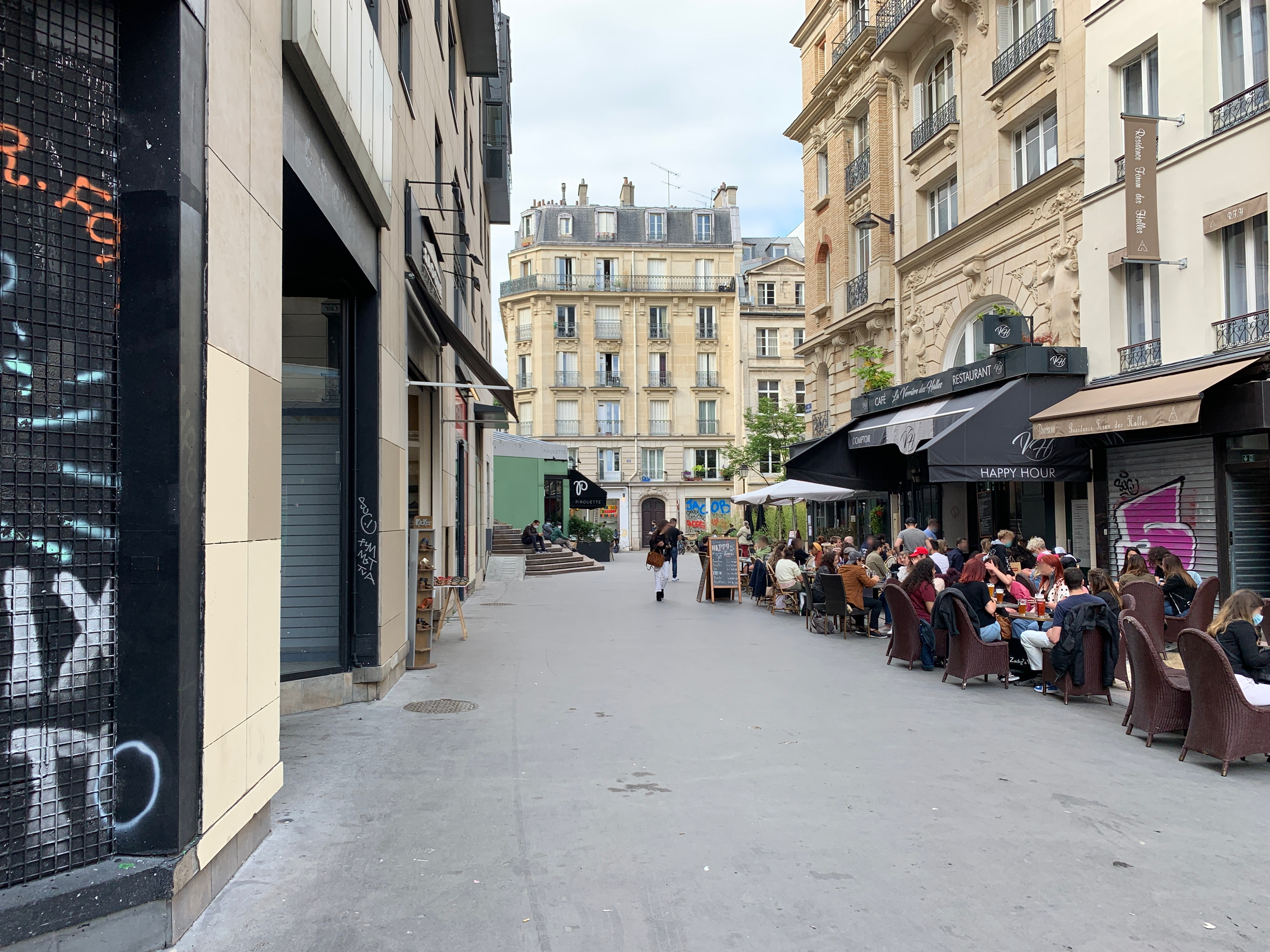
Rue Mondétour in June 2021

The Rue Mondétour (French pronunciation: [ʁy mɔ̃detuʁ]) is a small pedestrian street in the 1st arrondissement of Paris.

== Origin ==
This street owes perhaps its name to the lords of Mondetour, and particularly Claude Foucault, Lord of Mondetour who was alderman of the city of Paris in 1525 under the provost master Jean Morin. Other historians assume that the name of this street is an alteration of Rue Maudestour or Mauvais Détour ("Bad Detour").

== Bibliography ==
- Henri Sauval : History and research of the antiquities of the city of Paris
- Jean La Tynna, Dictionary topographic, etymological and historical of the streets of Paris (1817)
- Jacques Hillairet, Historical Dictionary of the streets of Paris
- Guillot de Paris, Le Dit des rues de Paris with preface, notes and glossary by Edgar Mareuse
