= Rue du Mont-Thabor =

Street in Paris, France

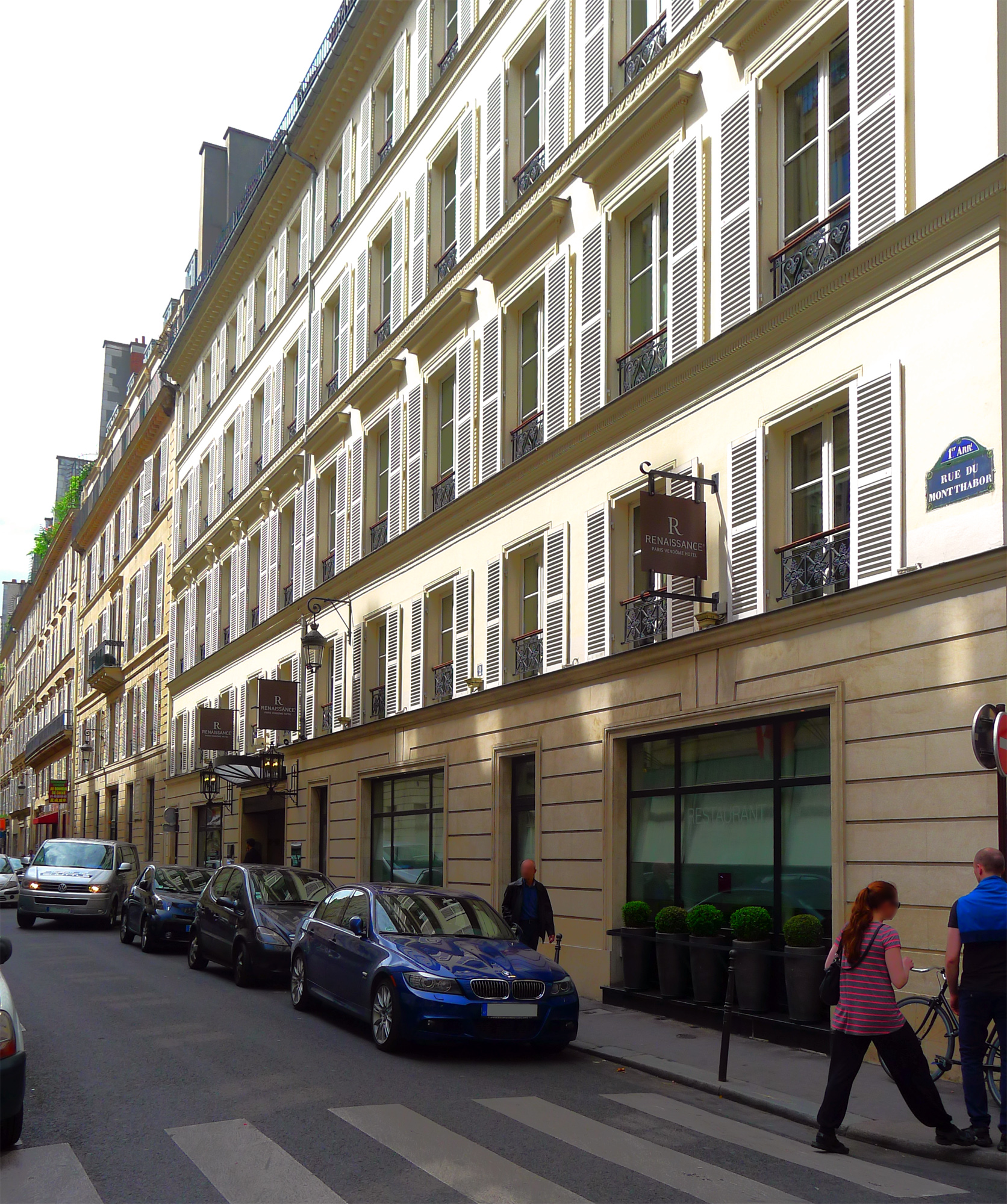
Rue du Mont-Thabor, Paris

The Rue du Mont-Thabor is a street in the 1st arrondissement of Paris, France.
