= Voie Georges-Pompidou =

Expressway through Paris, France

The Georges Pompidou expressway (Voie Georges-Pompidou) is a 13-kilometer route crossing Paris, France along the right bank of the Seine. It is essentially made up of expressways, except for the part going from the Tuileries tunnel to Quai Henri-IV (road on the banks to the east) which has become a bicycle and pedestrian street (since 2016).

It is named after the former President of the Republic Georges Pompidou (1911-1974) who inaugurated it in 1967 when he was Prime Minister and initiated the motorway plan for Paris.

== History ==
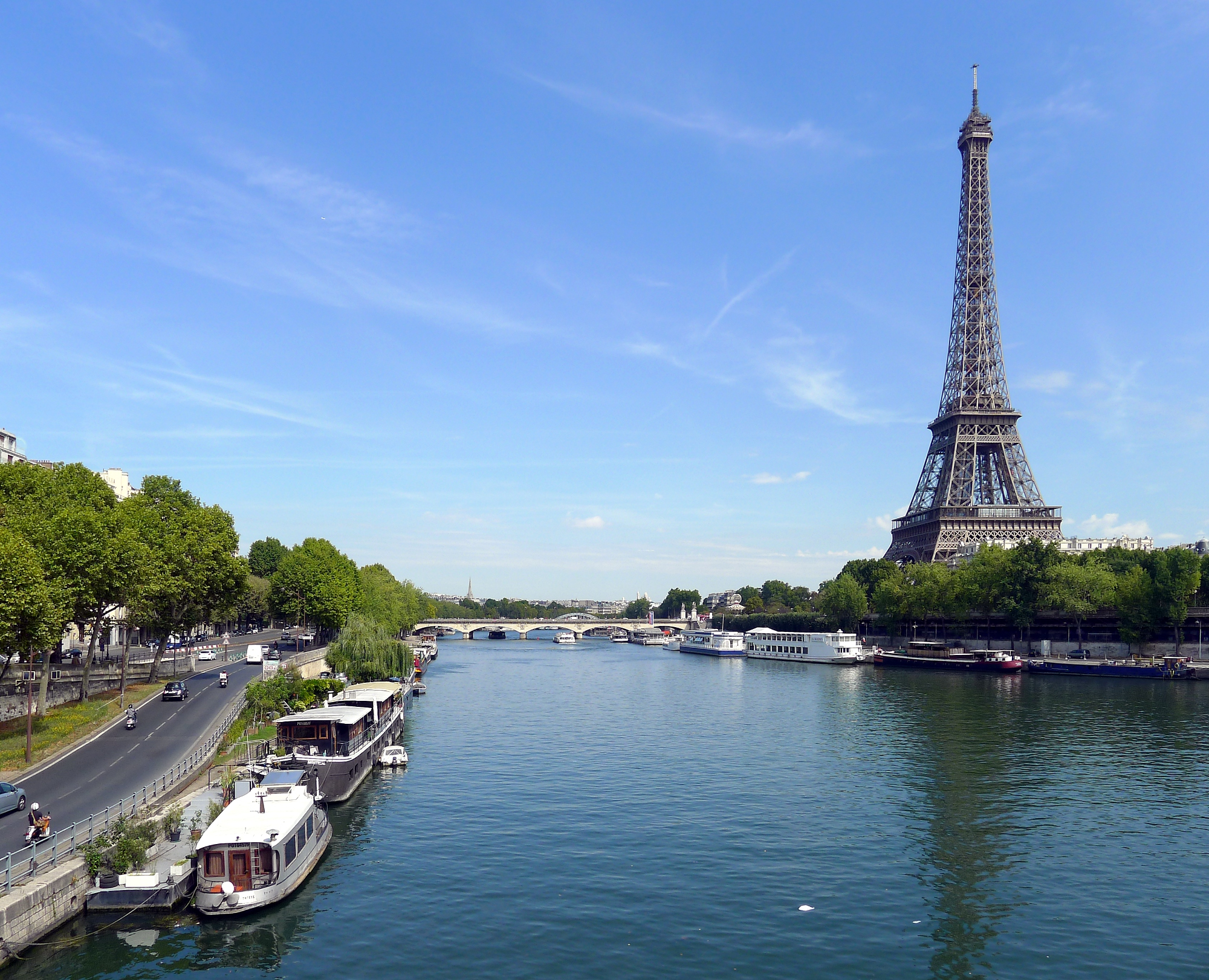
Voie Georges-Pompidou near the Eiffel Tower in 2011.

France's then-prime minister, Georges Pompidou, opened the 13-kilometer expressway in 1967.

From 2002, part of the highway became a beach in summer, known as "Paris-Plages" and visited by 4 million people annually (as of 2007).

Cars were banned on the left bank of the Seine in 2013 and on the right bank in 2017, after several years of experiments. The removal of the car road happened under the mayors Bertrand Delanoë and Anne Hidalgo, the latter calling the process "a "reconquest" of the city for its residents. This development is seen as a key example of a trend in Europe and around the world of cities discouraging cars from their roads.

Before the road was closed to them, 43,000 cars used the road daily. While some protested against the removal of cars, the majority supported it.
