= Henri-Robert =

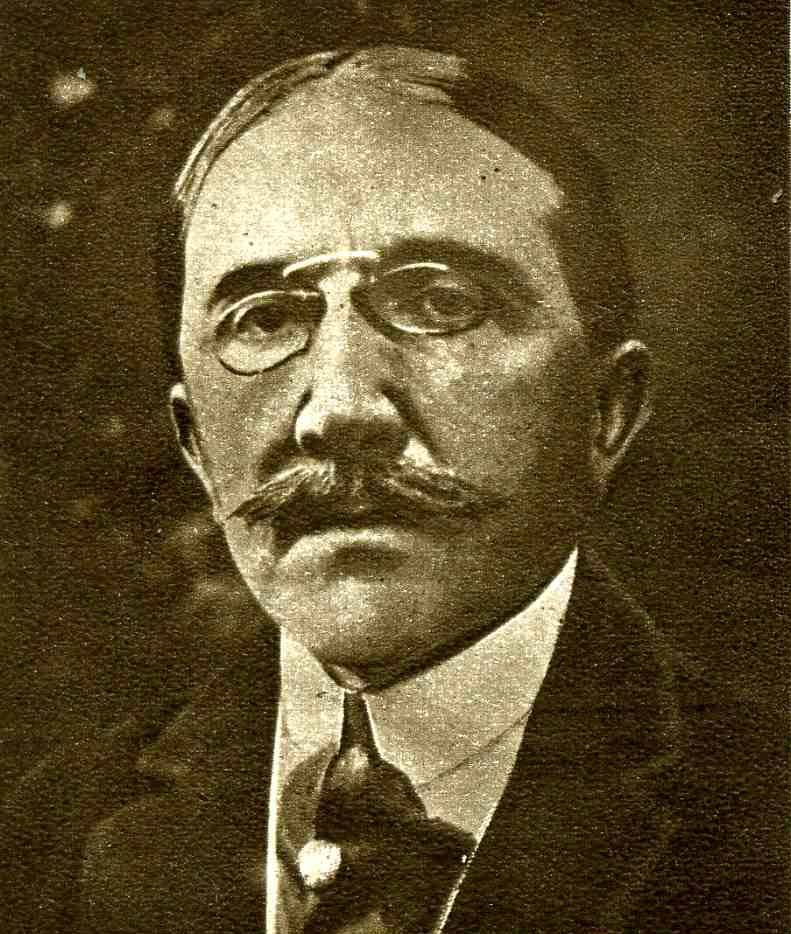
Henri-Robert

Henri-Robert (4 September 1863 – 12 May 1936) was a French lawyer, historian, and member of the Académie française in 1923.

Born of unknown parents and probably illegitimate, Henri-Robert was admitted to the Paris bar in 1885 and rose to become a celebrated criminal defense lawyer. He defended a young woman named Gabrielle Bompard in a sensational 1889 murder trial, calling in Georges Gilles de la Tourette as an expert witness on hypnotism. He also defended the fraudster Thérèse Humbert, and the serial child killer Jeanne Weber, twice. In 1903, a Paris correspondent for The New York Times described him as "an exceptionally successful lawyer... the favorite advocate of the criminal classes (who) has already saved innumerable heads from the guillotine".

From 1913 through 1919, he was President of the Paris Bar. After the First World War, Henri-Robert turned his focus to civil litigation and to the production of books on historical topics such as Mary Stuart, Henry VIII, Catherine de Médici, Marie-Antoinette, and Henri Coiffier de Ruzé, Marquis of Cinq-Mars.

Henri-Robert's daughter Jeanne Henri-Robert married the future French Prime Minister Paul Reynaud in 1912.
