= Quai François Mitterrand =

Thoroughfare in Paris, France

Coordinates: 48°51′35″N 2°20′05″E

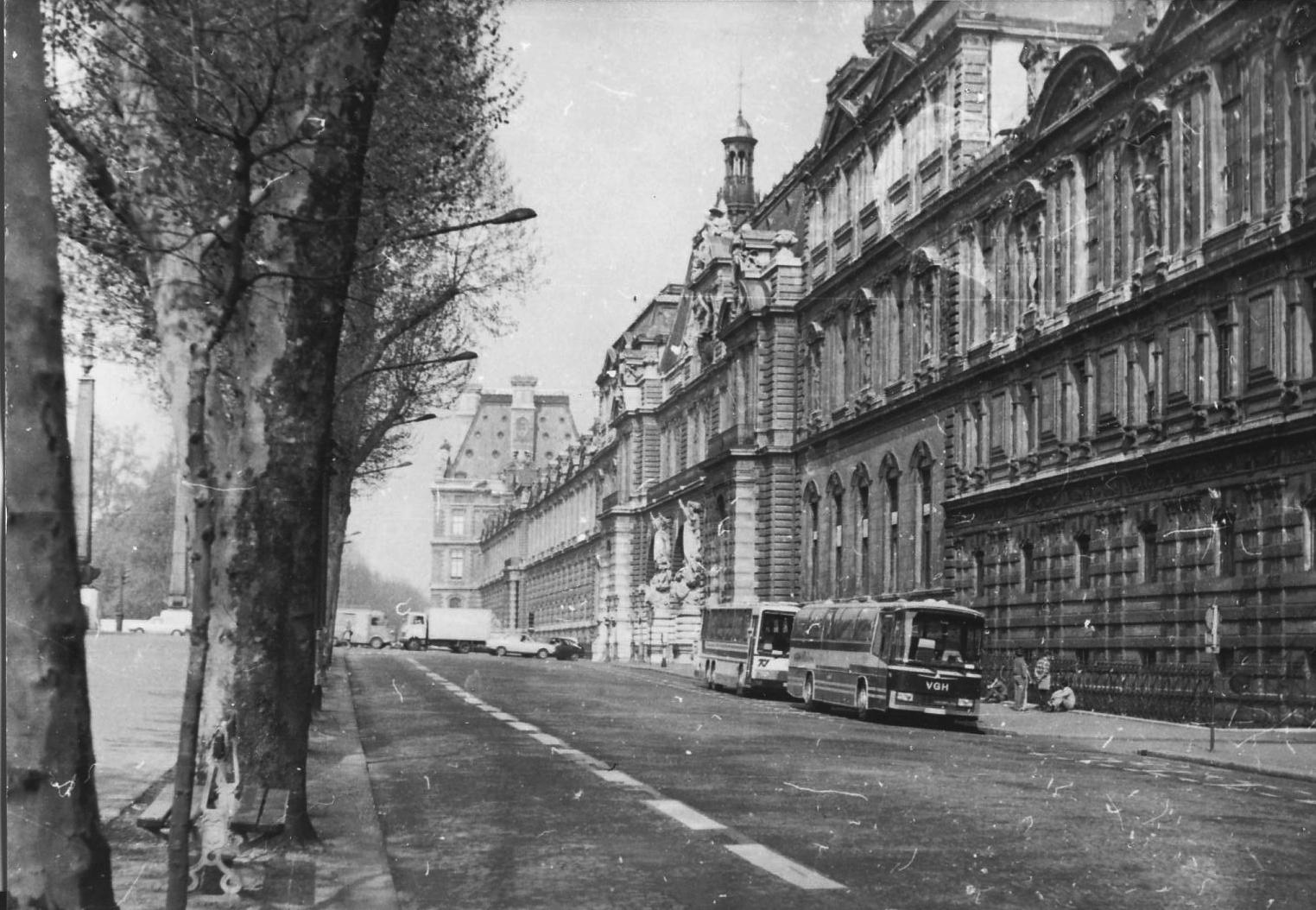
The River Seine is just out of sight to the left in this 1981 image of the then Quai du Louvre, with the Quai des Tuileries beyond.

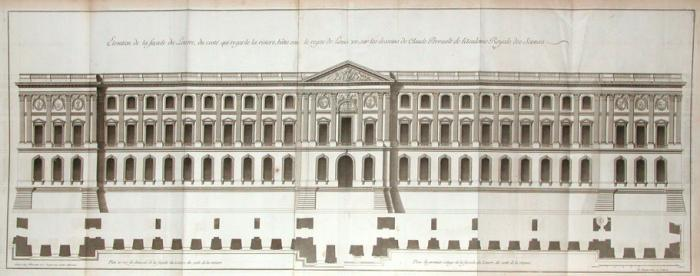
Engraving of the south façade of the Louvre, on the Quai du Louvre, from Jean Mariette's L'Architecture françoise (1738)

The Quai François Mitterrand is a quay by the River Seine in Paris, France, along the stretch where the Palais du Louvre is situated. Formerly the Quai du Louvre, it was renamed the Quai François Mitterrand after the former French president on October 26, 2003.
