= Quai des Tuileries =

Thoroughfare in Paris, France

Coordinates: 48°51′43″N 2°19′38″E

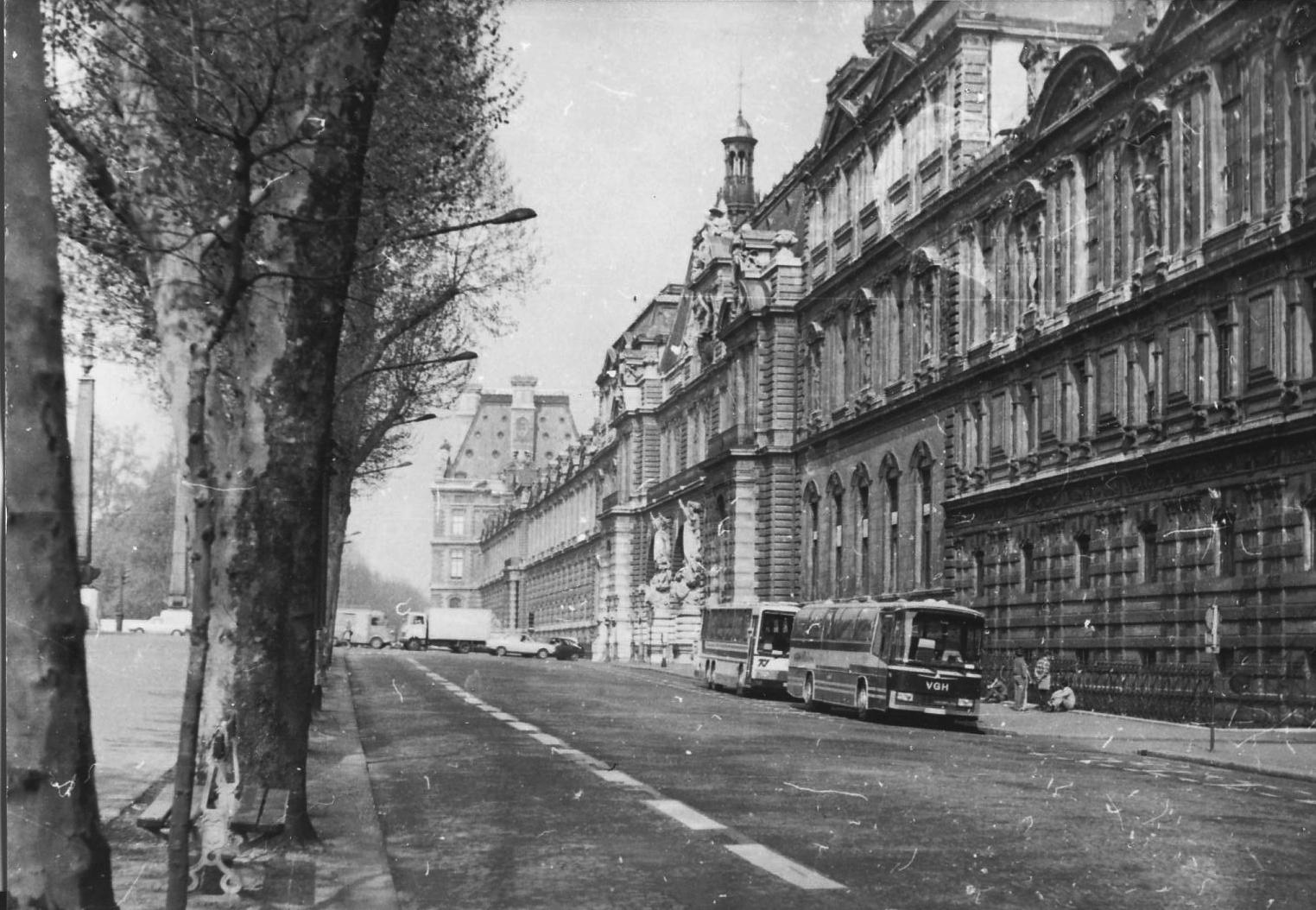
The River Seine is just out of sight to the left in this 1981 image of the Quai du Louvre, with the Quai des Tuileries beyond.

The Quai des Tuileries is a quay on the right bank of the River Seine in Paris, France, along the stretch close to where the Palais du Louvre and the Quai François Mitterrand is situated, in the 1st arrondissement.

The Quai des Tuileries runs between the Pont du Carrousel and the Pont de la Concorde that cross the Seine to the left bank. It is close to the Avenue du Général-Lemonnier and the Place de la Concorde. Vehicles may travel in one direction only.

== See also ==
- Passerelle Léopold-Sédar-Senghor, a footbridge
- Tuileries Garden
- Tuileries Palace
- Tunnel des Tuileries
