= Rue Molière =

Street in Paris, France

Coordinates: 48°51′55″N 2°20′11″E

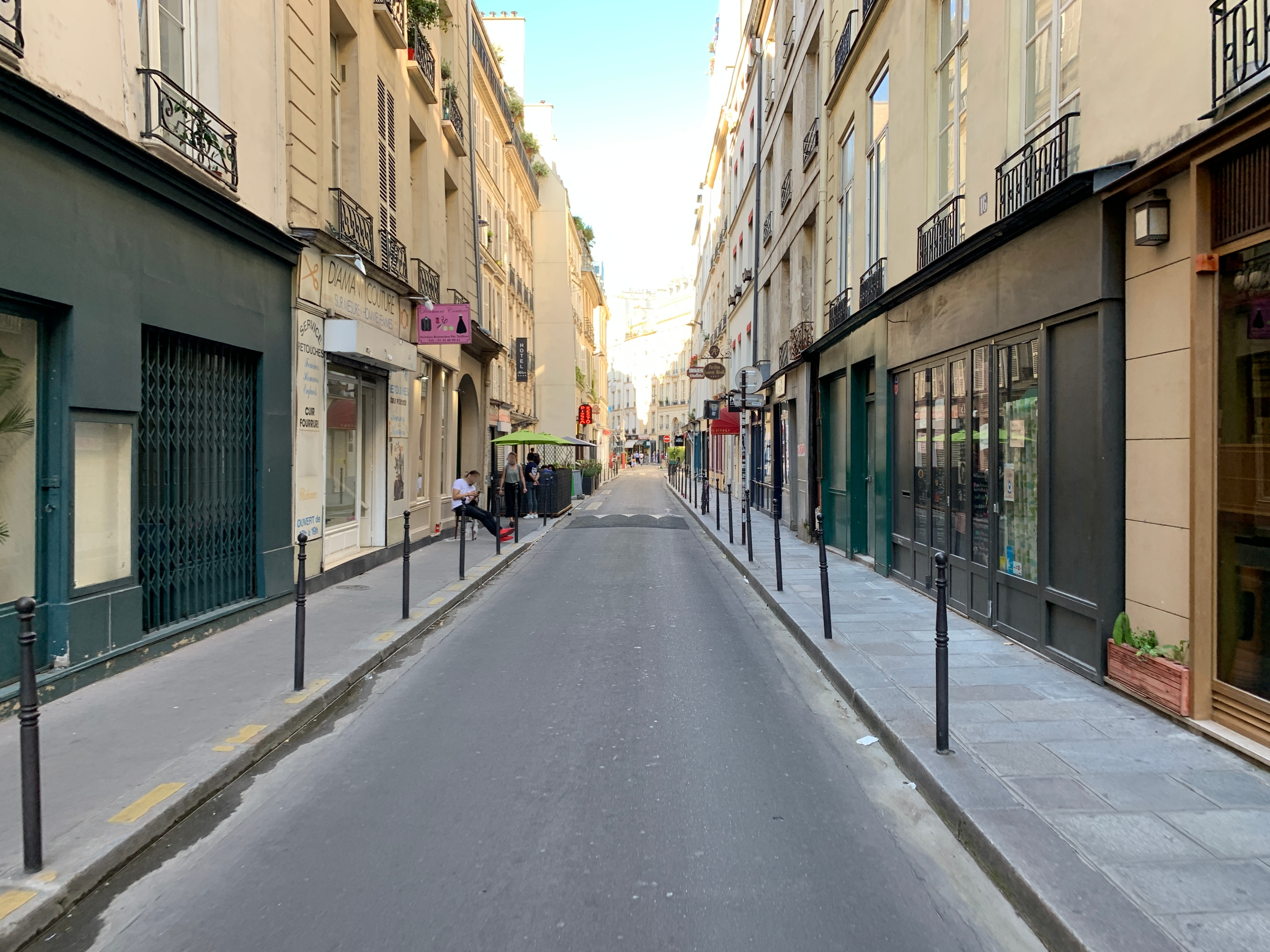
Rue Molière in June 2021

The Rue Molière is a short street in central Paris, in the 1st arrondissement. It begins at the Avenue de l'Opéra, near the Comédie-Française, and ends at the Rue de Richelieu with the Fontaine Molière.

It has borne several names, including the Rue de la Fontaine-Molière, the Rue Traversière-Saint-Honoré before 1843, earlier the Rue Traversine or Traversante, and in 1625 the Rue de la Brasserie or Rue du Bâton-Royal. It received its current name in 1867. It is notable for collège Jean-Baptiste-Poquelin, named after the playwright Jean-Baptiste-Poquelin, the real name of Molière.

From 1745 to 1750, Voltaire inhabited a house on the street. This house was later destroyed in the construction of the avenue de l'Opéra, during Haussmann's renovation of Paris. Mirabeau rented rooms on the street in 1790.
