= 1st arrondissement of Paris =

- Municipal arrondissement
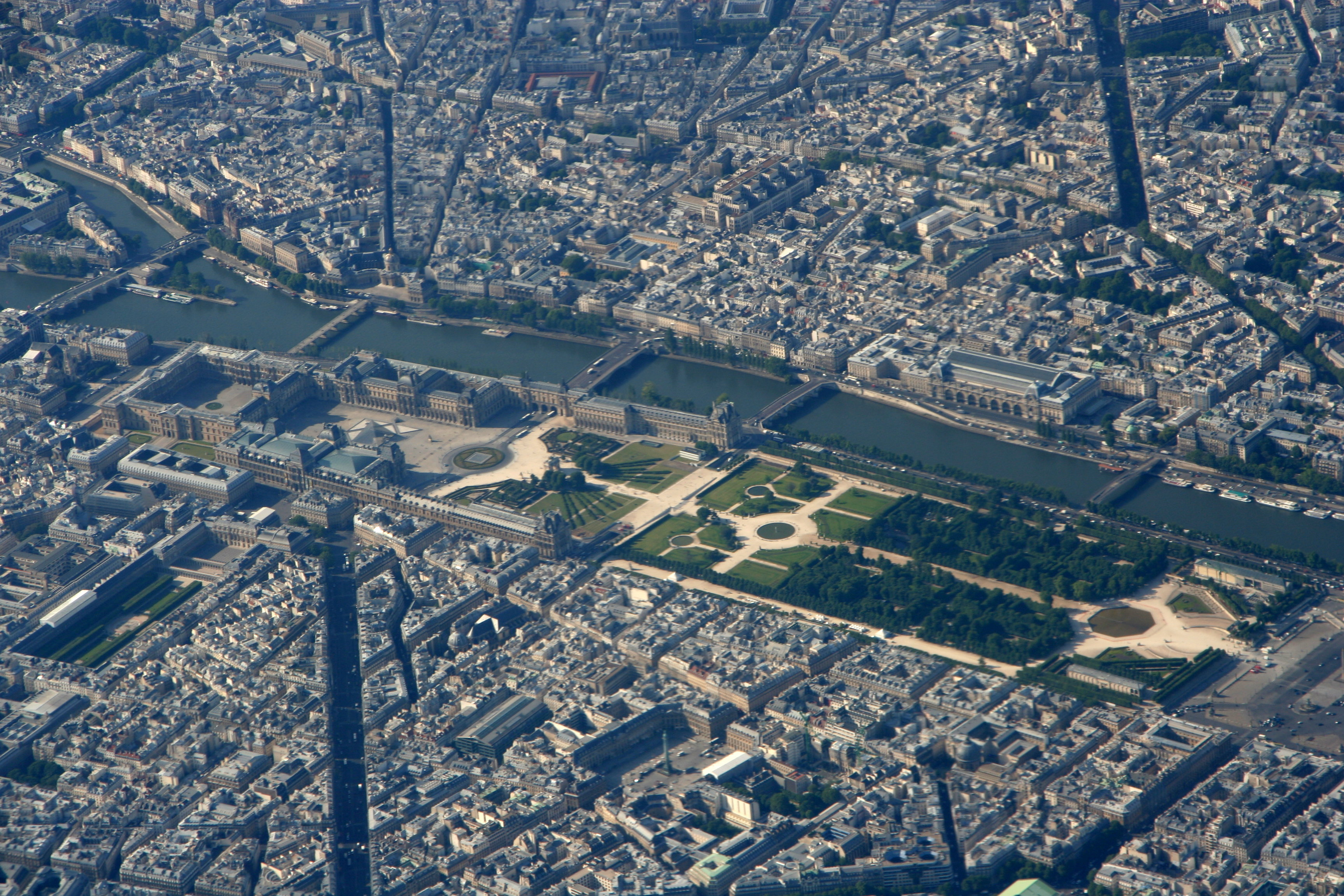
- The Louvre and Tuileries, seen from the north

- Coat of arms

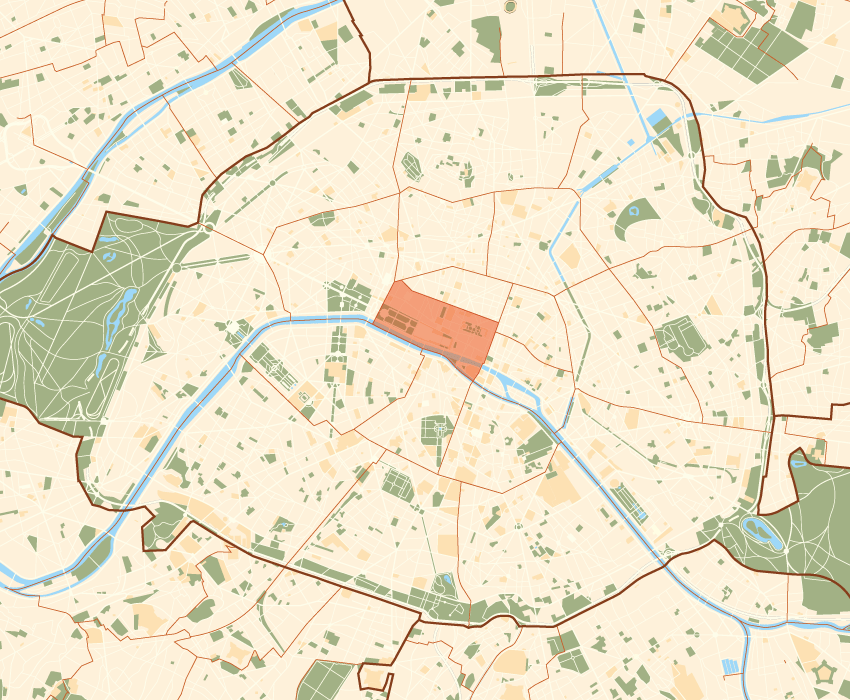
- Location within Paris
- Coordinates: 48°51′36″N 2°20′28″E
- Country: France
- Region: Île-de-France
- Department: Paris
- Commune: Paris

Government
  - Mayor (2020—2026): Ariel Weil (PS)
- Area: 1.83 km^{2} (0.71 sq mi)
- Population (2023): 15,114
  - Density: 8,260/km^{2} (21,400/sq mi)
- INSEE code: 75101

The 1st arrondissement of Paris (I^{er} arrondissement) is one of the 20 arrondissements of Paris, the capital city of France. In spoken French, this arrondissement is colloquially referred to as le premier (the first). It is governed locally together with the 2nd, 3rd and 4th arrondissement, with which it forms the 1st sector of Paris (Paris-Centre).

Also known as Louvre, the arrondissement is situated principally on the right bank of the River Seine. It also includes the west end of the Île de la Cité. The locality is one of the oldest areas in Paris, the Île de la Cité having been the heart of the city of Lutetia, conquered by the Romans in 52 BC, while some parts on the right bank (including Les Halles) date back to the early Middle Ages.

It is the least populated of the city's arrondissements and one of the smallest by area, with a land area of only 1.83 km^{2} (0.705 sq. miles, or 451 acres). In 2023, it had a population of 15,114. A significant part of the area is occupied by the Louvre Museum and the Tuileries Gardens. The Forum des Halles is the largest shopping mall in Paris. Much of the remainder of the arrondissement is dedicated to business and administration.

== Demography ==
The area now occupied by the first arrondissement attained its peak population in the period preceding the re-organization of Paris in 1860. In 1999, the arrondissement hosted 63,056 jobs, making it one of the most active for business after the 2nd, 8th, and 9th.

=== Historical population ===
Historical population

Year	Pop.	±% p.a.
1861	89,519	—
1872	74,286	−1.68%
1881	73,557	−0.11%
1891	66,399	−1.02%
1901	63,768	−0.40%
1911	59,037	−0.77%
1921	52,277	−1.21%
1931	42,166	−2.13%
1936	38,436	−1.84%
1946	36,478	−0.52%
1954	38,926	+0.82%

Year	Pop.	±% p.a.
1962	36,543	−0.79%
1968	32,332	−2.02%
1975	22,793	−4.87%
1982	18,509	−2.93%
1990	18,360	−0.10%
1999	16,888	−0.92%
2007	17,915	+0.74%
2012	17,100	−0.93%
2017	16,266	−1.00%
2023	15,114	−1.22%

Source: Demographia (1861-1999) and INSEE (1876-2023)

=== Immigration ===
Place of birth of residents of the 1st arrondissement in 2000
Born in metropolitan France	Born outside metropolitan France			
79.8%	25.2%			
79.8%	Born in overseas France	Born in foreign countries with French citizenship at birth^{1}	EU-15 immigrants^{2}	Non-EU-15 immigrants
79.8%	0.9%	5.1%	7.6%	19.8%
^{1} This group is made up largely of former French settlers, such as pieds-noirs in Northwest Africa, followed by former colonial citizens who had French citizenship at birth (such as was often the case for the native elite in French colonies), as well as to a lesser extent foreign-born children of French expatriates. A foreign country is understood as a country not part of France in 2000, so a person born for example in 1950 in Algeria, when Algeria was an integral part of France, is nonetheless listed as a person born in a foreign country in French statistics.^{2} An immigrant is a person born in a foreign country not having French citizenship at birth. An immigrant may have acquired French citizenship since moving to France, but is still considered an immigrant in French statistics. On the other hand, persons born in France with foreign citizenship (the children of immigrants) are not listed as immigrants.

== Quarters ==
The quarters of the 1st arrondissement

Each of the 20 Paris arrondissements is divided into four quarters (quartiers). The table below lists the four quarters of the 1st arrondissement:

figures from 1999 French census

Quarter	Administrative number	Population	Land area (in km^{2})	Density (inh. per km^{2})
Quartier Saint-Germain-l'Auxerrois	1	1,670	0.871	1,917
Quartier Les Halles	2	8 980	0.412	21,796
Quartier Palais-Royal	3	3,190	0.279	11,434
Quartier Place Vendôme	4	3,040	0.270	11,259

== Economy ==
Korean Air's France office is in the 1st arrondissement.

At one time Air Inter's head office was located in the first arrondissement. When Minerve, an airline, existed, its head office was in the first arrondissement.

== Education ==
In terms of state-operated schools, the first arrondissement has two nursery schools (écoles maternelles), two primary schools (écoles élémentaires), one école polyvalente, one high school (collège), and one sixth-form college (lycée).

The state-operated nursery schools are École Maternelle Auxerrois and École Maternelle Sourdiere. The state-operated primary schools are École Élémentaire Arbre Sec and École Élémentaire D'Argenteuil. The arrondissement has one école polyvalente, École Polyvalente Cambon. Collège Jean-Baptiste Poquelin is the sole state-operated high school in the arrondissement. Lycée Professionnel Commercial Pierre Lescot is the sole state-operated sixth-form college in the first arrondissement. Private primary and secondary institutions in the arrondissement include École Élémentaire Privée Notre-Dame-Saint-Roch, École du 2nd Degré Professionnel Privée Pigier, and École Technologique Privée de Dessin Technique et Artistique Sornas.

== Map ==
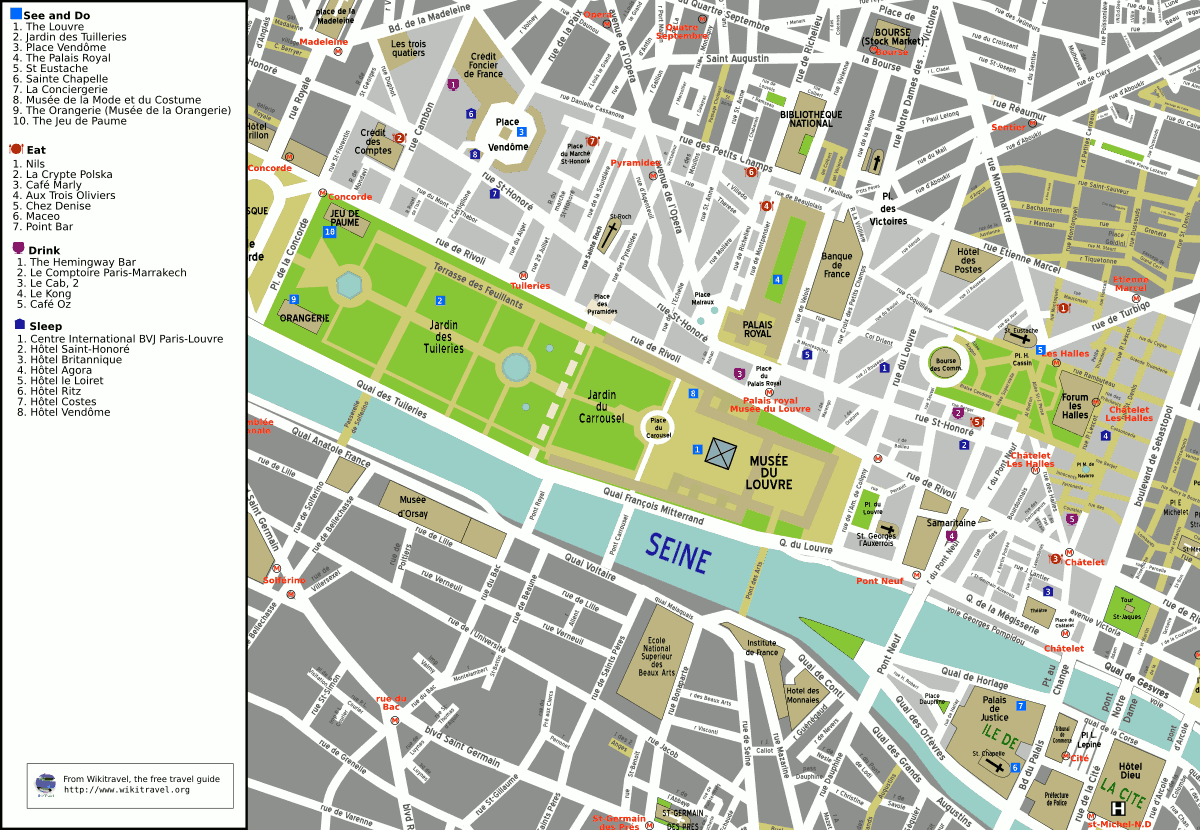
Map of the 1st arrondissement.

== Cityscape ==
=== Places of interest ===
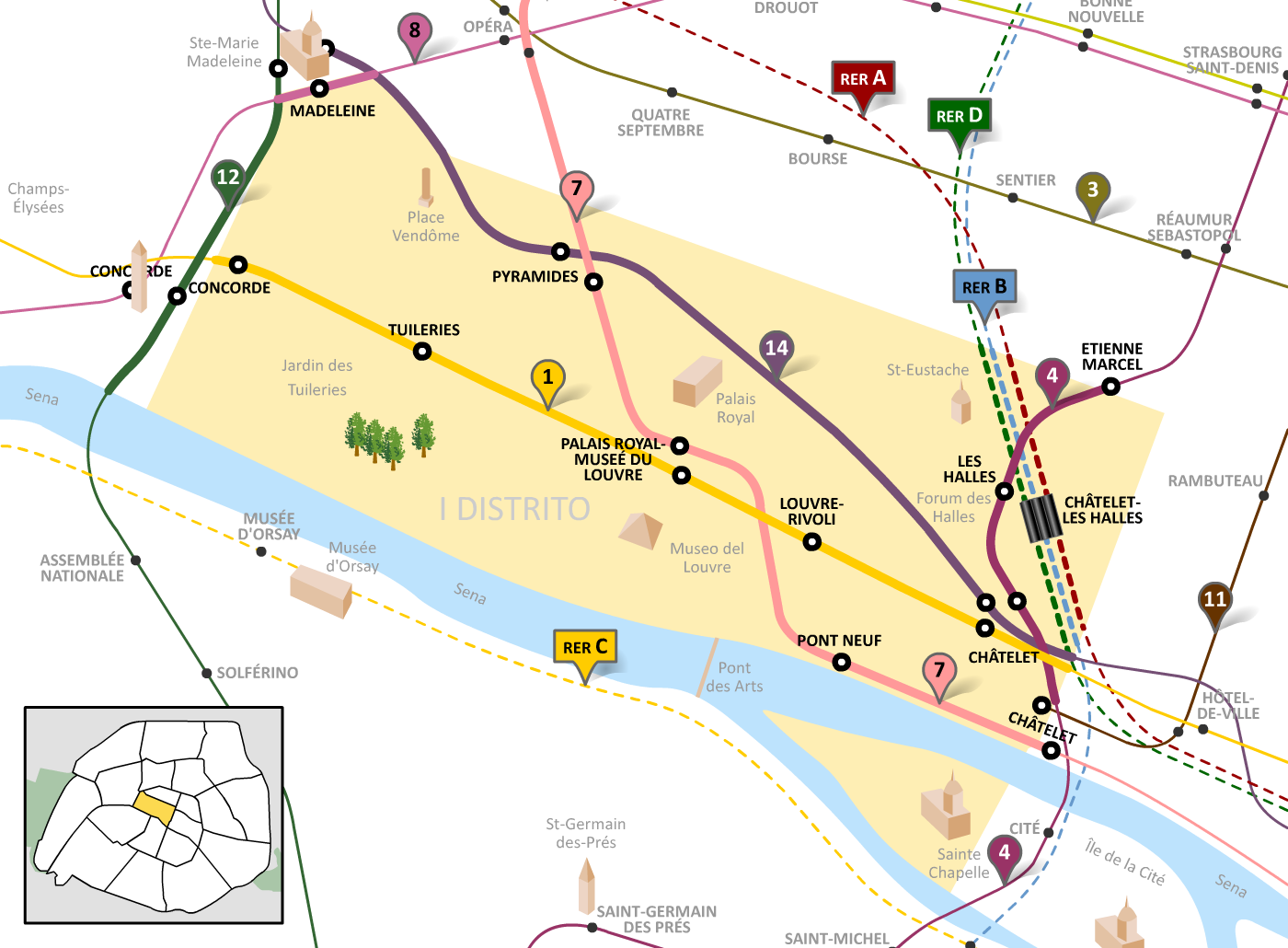
Transport: Metro and RER.

- Arc de Triomphe du Carrousel, at the eastern end of the Axe historique ("historical axis")
- Bank of France headquarters
- Colonne Médicis
- Comédie-Française
- Crédit Foncier de France historical headquarters
- The Louvre
- Galerie Véro-Dodat
- Les Halles
- Musée des Arts Décoratifs
  - Musée de la Mode et du Textile
  - Musée de la Publicité
- Musée du Barreau de Paris
- Musée Grévin – Forum des Halles
- Musée des Lunettes et Lorgnettes Pierre Marly
- Palais Royal
- Hôtel de Vendôme
- Hôtel de Rambouillet (former building)
- Hôtel Ritz Paris
- La Sainte-Chapelle
- La Samaritaine
- Tuileries Garden
  - Galerie nationale du Jeu de Paume
  - Musée de l'Orangerie

=== Bridges ===
- Pont Neuf
- Pont des Arts

=== Streets and squares ===
- Avenue de l'Opéra (partial)
- Rue Molière
- Rue de Rivoli (partial)
- Place Vendôme and the Vendôme Column

== See also ==
- Street Names of Paris, 1er arrondissement
