= Pavillon de Flore =

Pavilion in the Palais du Louvre

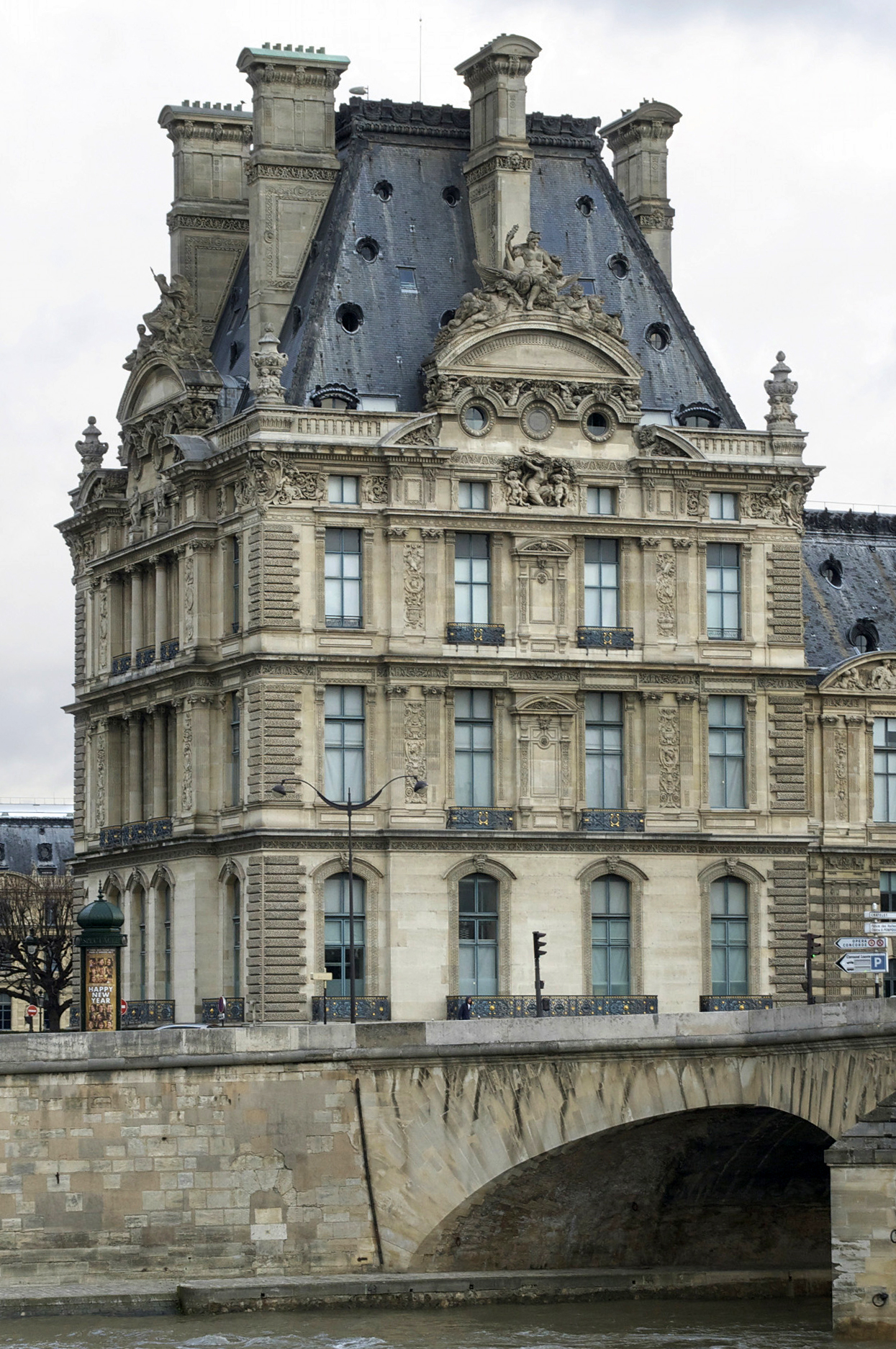
Pavillon de Flore in 2011. Carpeaux's sculpture Flore is centered under the pediment of the south (river) facade.

Outline plan of the Louvre Palace: the Pavillon de Flore is at the lower left, in red; the former Tuileries Palace, on the left, in white; the 'old' quadrangular Louvre, on the right, in two shades of blue.

The Pavillon de Flore (French pronunciation: [pavijɔ̃ d(ə) flɔʁ]), part of the Louvre Palace in Paris, France, stands at the southwest end of the Louvre, near the Pont Royal. It was originally constructed in 1607–1610, during the reign of Henry IV, as the corner pavilion between the Tuileries Palace to the north and the Louvre's Grande Galerie to the east. The pavilion was entirely redesigned and rebuilt by Hector-Martin Lefuel in 1864–1868 in a highly decorated Second Empire style. Arguably the most famous sculpture on the exterior of the Louvre, Jean-Baptiste Carpeaux's Triumph of Flora, was added below the central pediment of the south façade at this time. The Tuileries Palace was burned by the Paris Commune in 1871, and a north façade, similar to the south façade, was added to the pavilion by Lefuel in 1874–1879. Currently, the Pavillon de Flore is part of the Louvre Museum.

== Location ==
The Pavillon de Flore is in central Paris, on the Right Bank and is connected to the Louvre Palace. It is directly adjacent to the Pont Royal on the Quai François Mitterrand (formerly Quai du Louvre, renamed on October 26, 2003), which is between the Passerelle Léopold-Sédar-Senghor and the Pont du Carrousel. Its geographic coordinates are 48°51′40″N 2°19′50″E.

=== Metro access ===
Located near the Metro station: Tuileries.

Located near the Metro station: Palais Royal–Musée du Louvre.

== History ==
=== 17th century ===
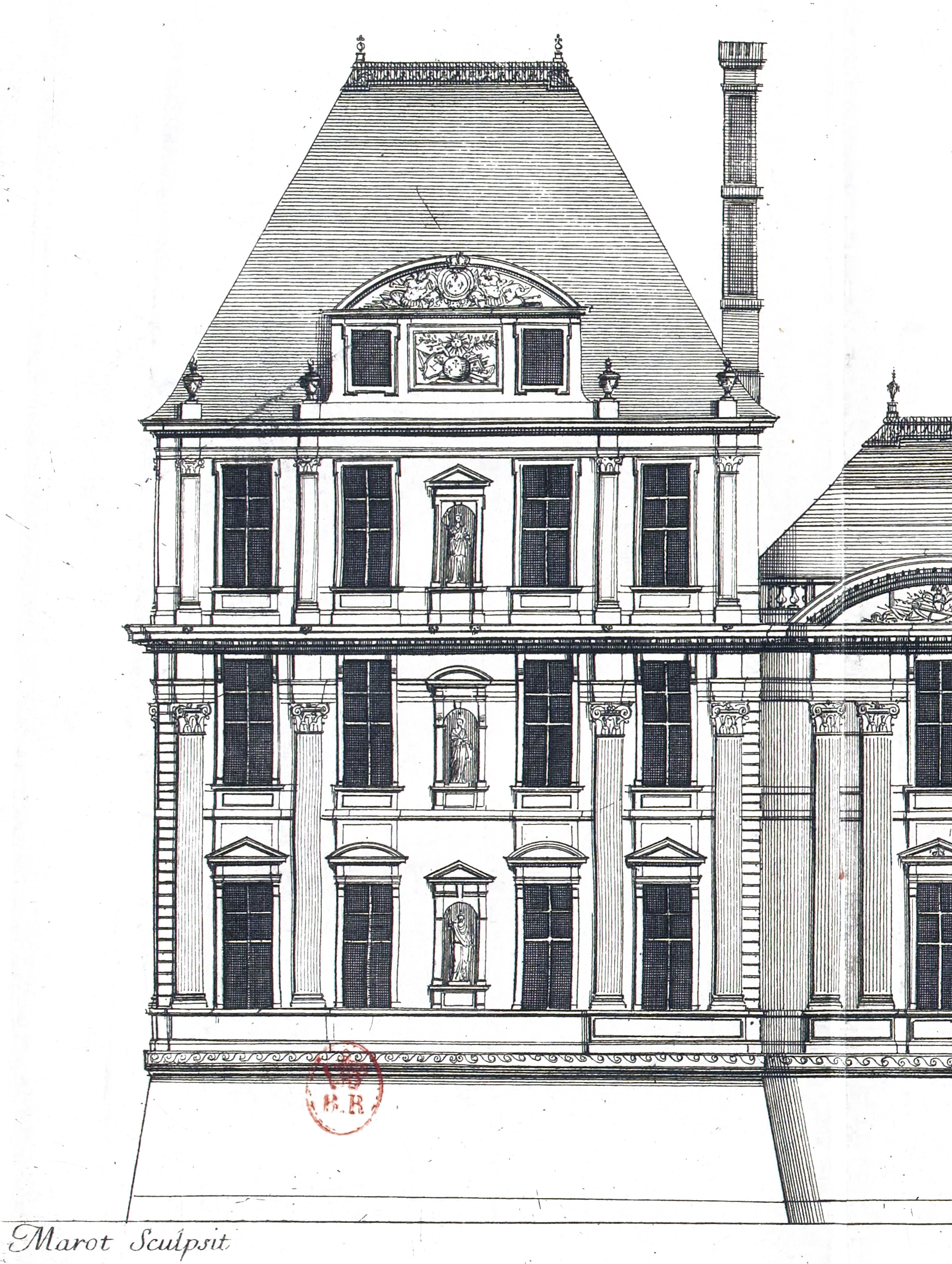
South façade, engraving c. 1670 by Jean Marot

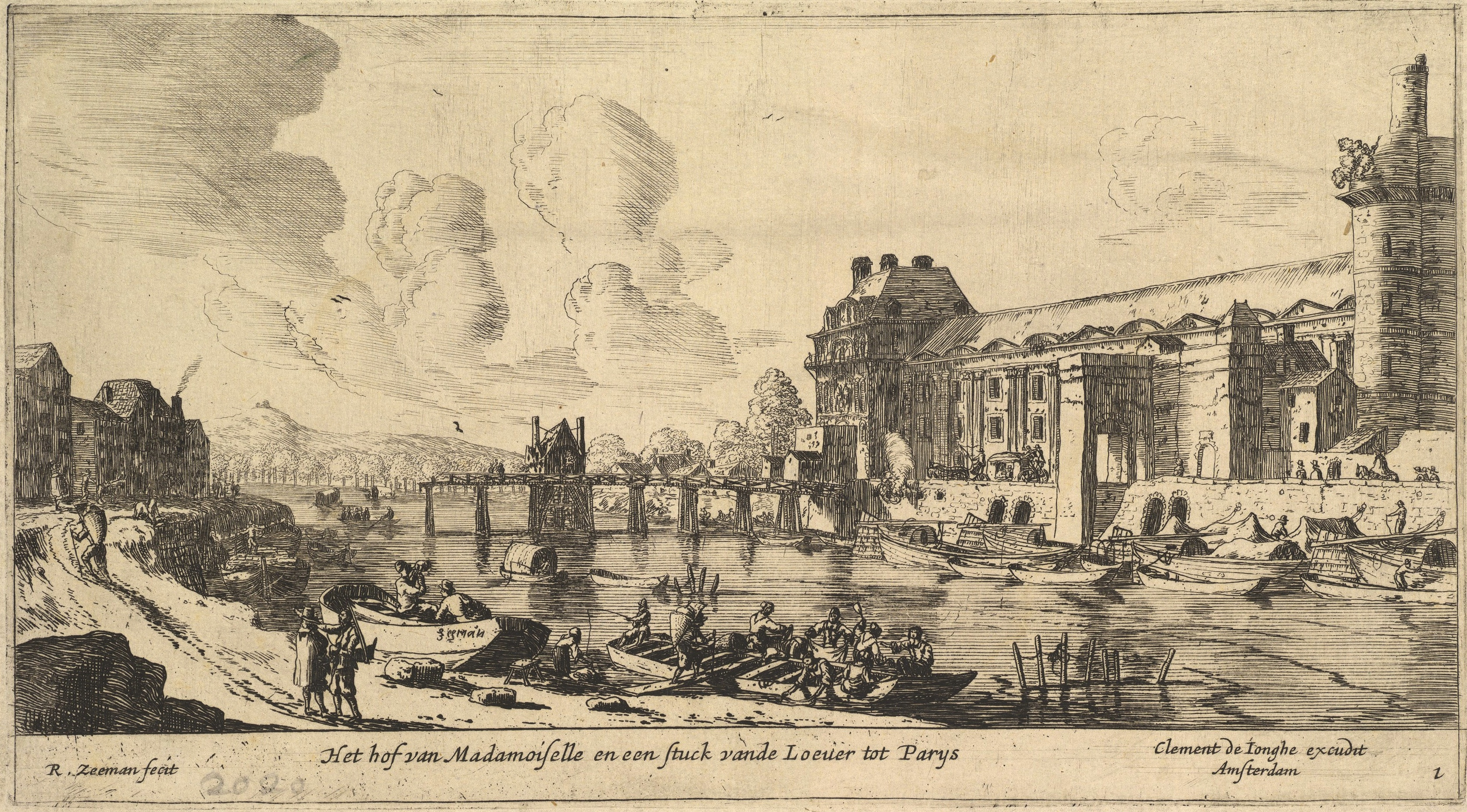
View of the Grande Galerie and pavilion in the 17th century

The Pavillon de Flore was part of a larger plan, known as the "Grand Design" (grand dessein) and devised during the reign of King Henry IV, to connect the Louvre Palace and Tuileries Palace. The Grande Galerie was built from 1595, starting at the riverside end of the pre-existing Petite Galerie which ran south from the Louvre Palace to the Seine, for half a kilometer along the Seine until it reached the Tuileries. The Pavillon de Flore, known at the time as the gros pavillon de la rivière or pavillon du bout de la galerie, marked the endpoint of the new wing and its connection with the Tuileries. The cornerstone of the pavilion was laid in 1607, and its exterior structure was nearly completed by October 1608. Its design has traditionally been assigned to Jacques Androuet II du Cerceau, who is also thought to have designed the adjacent western section of the Grande Galerie. The Tuileries Palace was duly extended south from its Pavillon Bullant to connect with the Pavillon de Flore, via the Petite Galerie des Tuileries. Further work on the Grand Design was abandoned following the assassination of Henry IV in 1610. By that time, the building of the Grande Galerie, the Gros Pavillon de la Rivière, and the Petite Galerie des Tuileries had been substantially completed.

King Louis XIV organized yearly ballets, and in early 1669 insisted on a particularly magnificent one to be held in the Pavillon's Grand Salon. The seasons-themed spectacle, titled Ballet de Flore, was a joint creation of scenic designer Carlo Vigarani, costume designer Henri de Gissey, libretto author Isaac de Benserade, and music composer Jean-Baptiste Lully. It was first danced on 13 February 1669, with the King himself taking a dancing role, with repeat representations in the following weeks. The memory of that Flore Ballet show appears to have lingered in the building's name, even though the earliest known written mention is in 1726. A similar lingering memory, of Louis XIV's great carrousel show of 1662, remains in the name of the Place du Carrousel, which first appears in written sources in 1714.

=== 18th century ===
The Pavillon's Grand Salon was converted into apartments in 1716, shortly after Louis XIV's death.

From 1789 until 1792, when the French royal court resided in the Tuileries, the apartment of the ground floor of the Pavillon de Flore housed the office of the princesse de Lamballe, being side by side with the apartment of Queen Marie Antoinette in the ground floor of the main building of the Tuileries, while the first floor of the Pavillon housed the apartment of Madame Elisabeth.

During the French Revolution, the Pavillon de Flore was renamed Pavillon de l'Égalité (House of Equality). Under its new name, it became the meeting point for several of the Committees of the period. Many other committees of the Revolutionary Government occupied the Tuileries Palace (referred to by contemporaries as the Palace of the Nation) during the time of the National Convention. Notable occupiers included the Monetary Committee, the Account and Liquidation Examination Committee. However, the most famous was the Committee of Public Safety.

The Committee of Public Safety was the principal and most renowned body of the Revolutionary Government, forming the de facto executive branch of France during the Reign of Terror. Run by the Jacobins under Robespierre, the group of twelve centralized denunciations, trials, and executions. The committee was responsible for the deaths of thousands, mostly by guillotine. The executive body was initially installed in the apartments of Marie Antoinette, situated on the first floor, but also gradually overtook the offices of Louis XVI. The governing body met twice a day and the executions themselves were carried out across the gardens.

=== 19th century ===
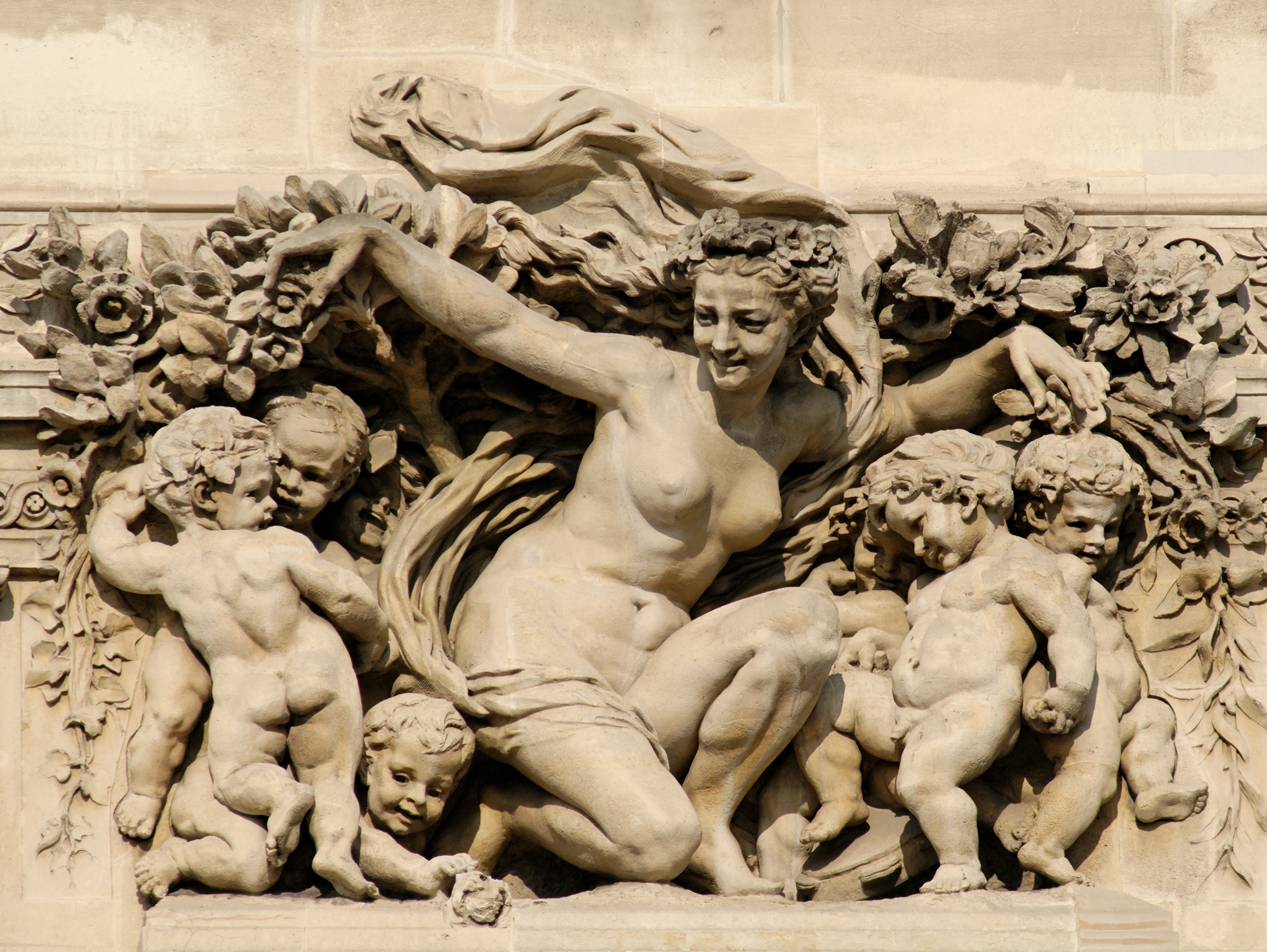
Le Triomphe de Flore

Pope Pius VII stayed in the building on the occasion of Napoleon I's coronation as Emperor of the French, arriving ahead of the ceremony on 2 December 1804 and staying until April 1805. While residing there, the Pope received various "bodies of the State, the clergy, and the religious corporations." Additionally, Emperor Napoleon's procession began at the Pavillon de Flore.

The pavilion underwent significant structural alteration during the reign of Napoleon III, who in 1861 authorized its complete demolition and reconstruction under the supervision of architect Hector-Martin Lefuel. Performed between 1864 and 1868, Lefuel's reconstruction added significant detail and sculpture to the work, which is thus noted as an example of Second Empire style architecture. Furthermore, Napoleon III commissioned sculptor Jean-Baptiste Carpeaux to create a piece that would evoke "Flore" (in English Flora), the Roman goddess who represents flowers and spring.

The structure formed the corner edifice of a combined Louvre Palace and Tuileries Palace complex until the Tuileries was destroyed during the Paris Commune insurrection in 1871. On May 23, 1871, incendiary fires set by twelve members of the revolutionary Paris Commune inflicted severe damage to the Tuileries. The Pavillon de Flore, which was less damaged than the rest of the palace, was restored by Lefuel between 1874 and 1879 with a brand-new north façade. The second floor again caught fire in October 1880 and was subsequently restored. The nearby ruins of the Tuileries Palace were eventually pulled down in 1882 during the French Third Republic. As a consequence, the Pavillon de Flore and the Pavillon de Marsan are the only portions of the Tuileries complex still in existence. Since the Tuileries' axis was not aligned with the rest of the Louvre including the Grande Galerie, the Pavillon de Flore remains at a slight angle (6.33°) to the immediately adjacent wing.

After the Paris City Hall was also arsoned at the end of the Commune in May 1871, the Municipal Council of Paris and Prefect of the Seine first moved to the Luxembourg Palace across the Seine, but they had to leave that building in 1878 as the Senate prepared to move back from their previous temporary location in the Palace of Versailles, and relocated for several years in the aile de Flore of the Louvre. The new City Hall was formally inaugurated on 13 July 1882 but it took significantly longer to finish the interior works, with some ceremonial rooms only completed in 1906. While in the Louvre the Municipal Council's meetings were held in Napoleon III's unfinished Salle des Etats of the Pavillon des Sessions, from 1878 to 1883. The Bibliothèque de l'hôtel de ville de Paris left the Louvre in 1887 for its current City Hall location. The offices of the Prefecture and apartment of Préfet Eugène Poubelle remained in the Pavillon de Flore until 1893, when they were replaced by the Ministry of Colonies, despite a 1883 order (décret) that had transferred the entire aile de Flore to the museum.

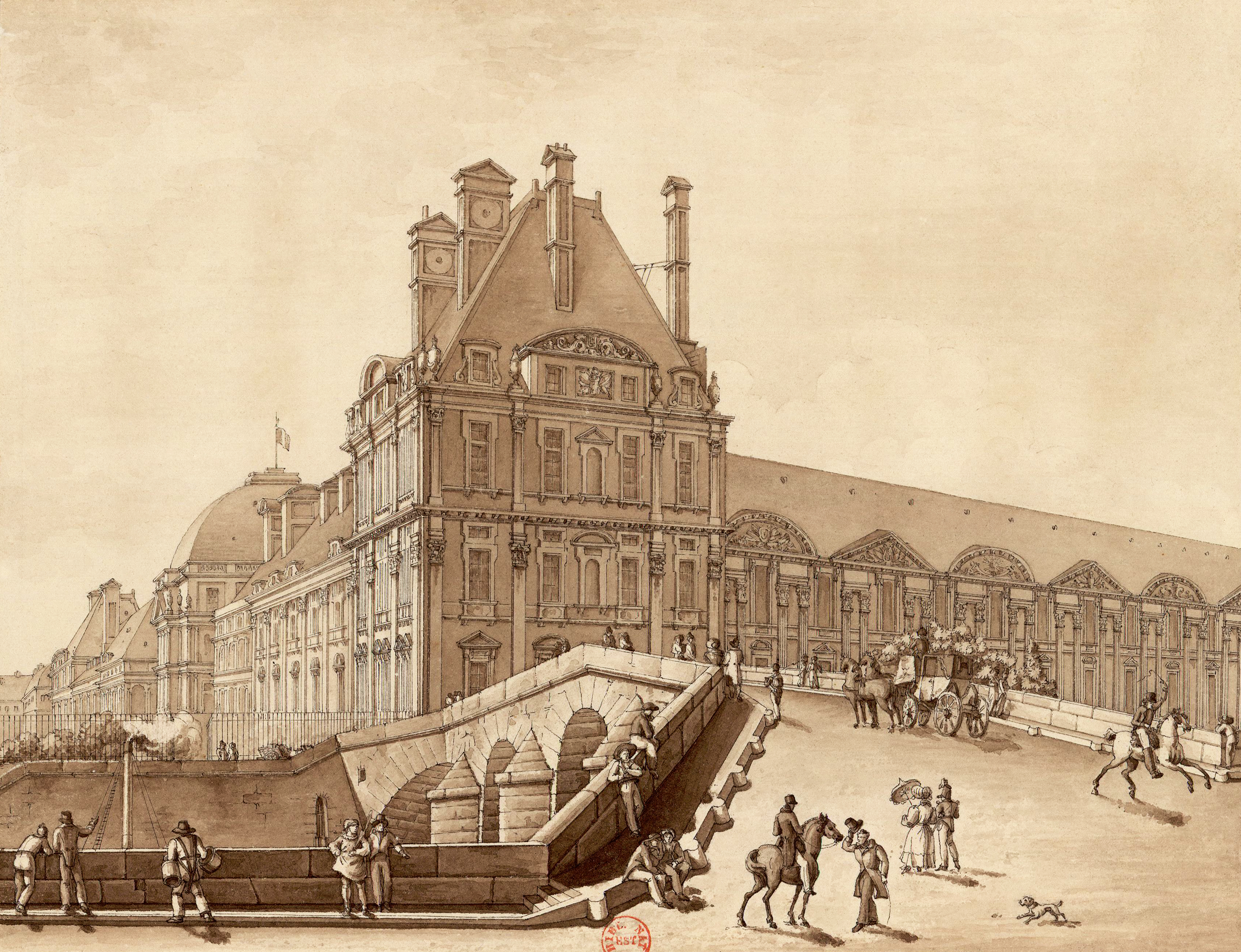
View from across the Pont Royal, drawing in brown ink (1814)

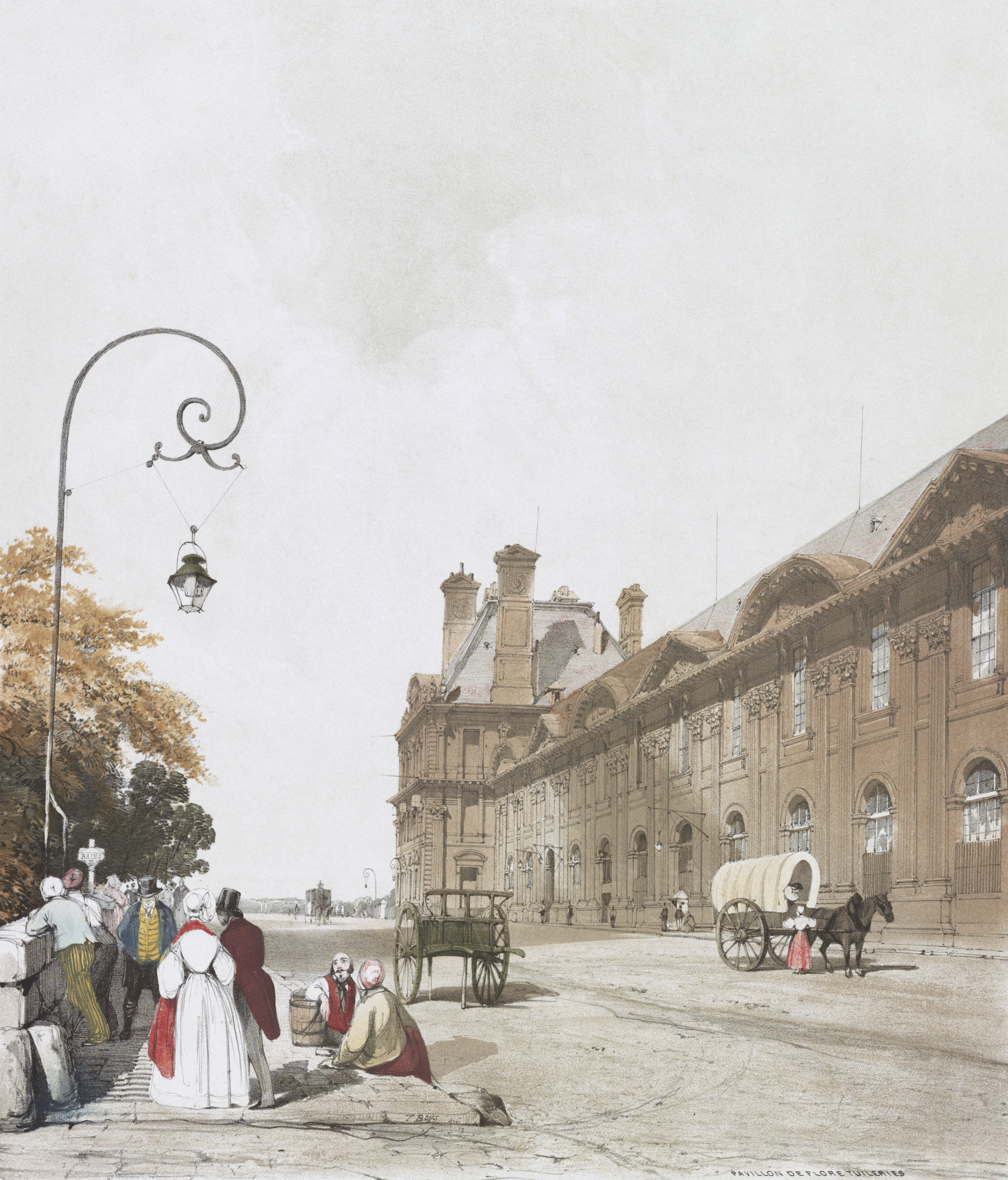
Pavillon de Flore and western part of the Grande Galerie in the 1830s, lithograph by Thomas Shotter Boys

South façade in 1861 just before demolition and reconstruction, photograph by Édouard Baldus

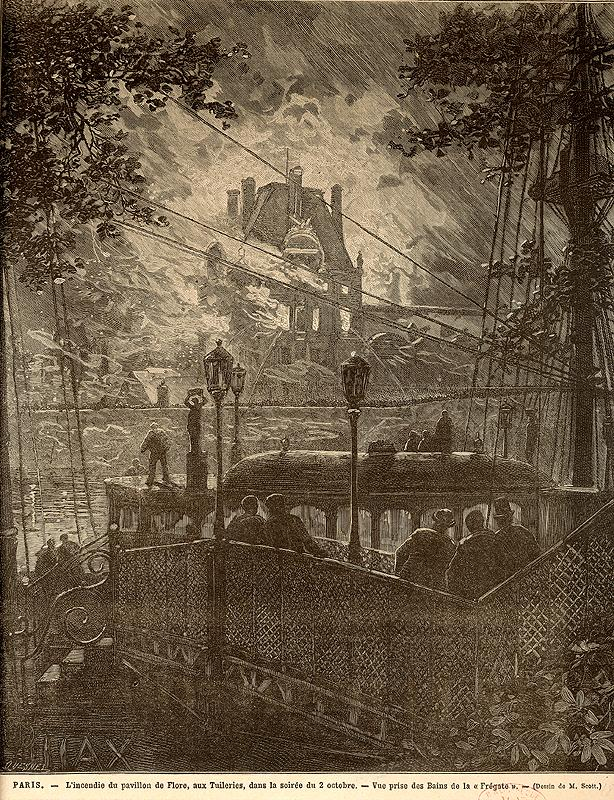
Fire at the Pavillon de Flore, 2 October 1880

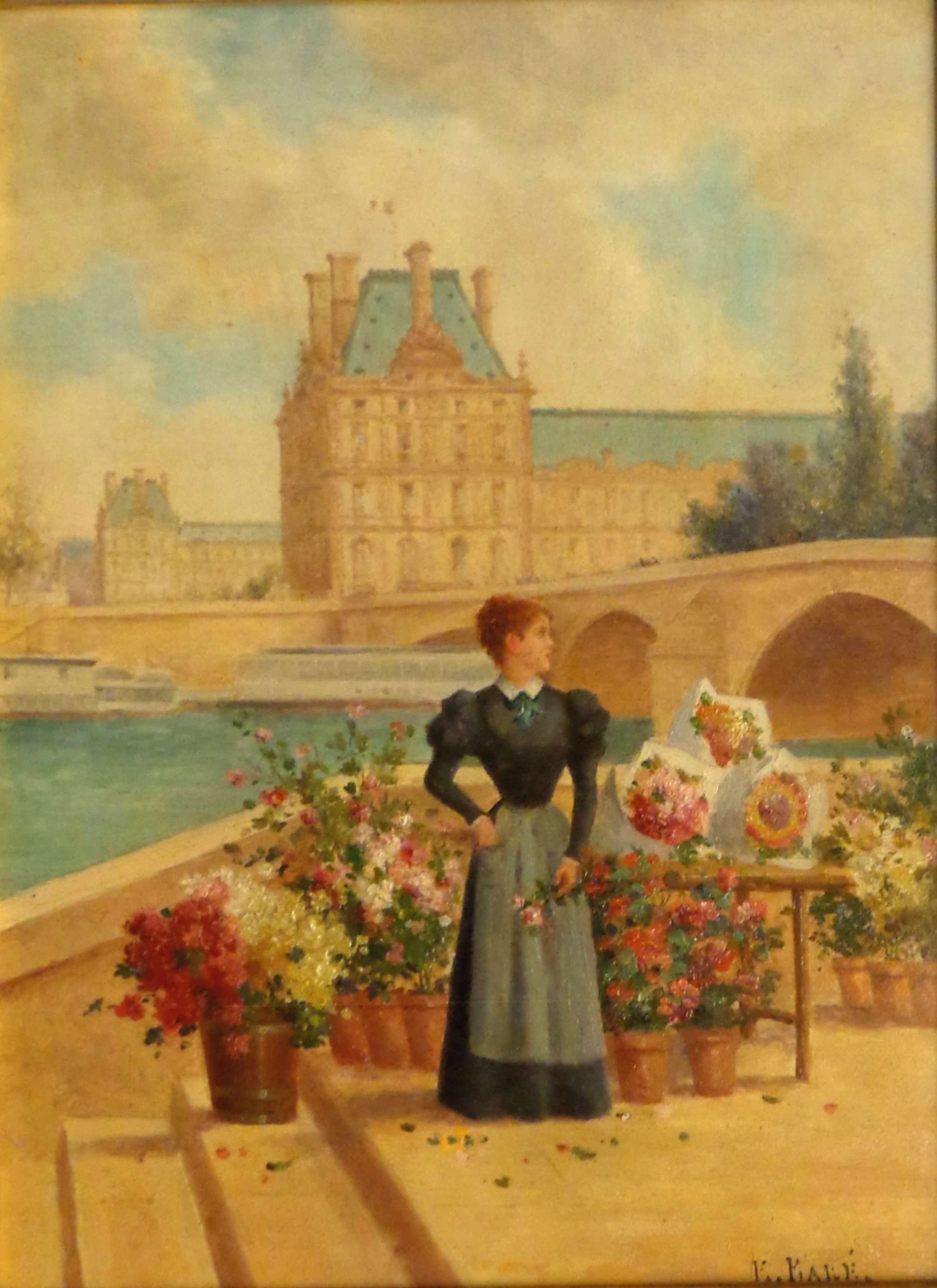
The Florist and the Pavillon de Flore (Émile Baré, late 19C)

=== 20th century ===
The Ministry of Colonies was installed in the Flore Wing from 1893 to 1909. The museum then planned to expand into the Flore Wing but that was thwarted during World War I as the facility was used by the wartime bond issuance service. The Finance Ministry, together with the National Lottery it created in 1933, remained there and stayed until 1961. In 1961, the Finance Ministry accepted to leave the Pavillon de Flore at the southwestern end of the Louvre building, as Henri Verne had recommended in his 1920s plan. New exhibition spaces of sculptures (ground floor) and paintings (first floor) opened there later in the 1960s, on a design by government architect Olivier Lahalle.

The Laboratoire du département des peintures du Musée du Louvre was created in 1932 to support research on paintings and leverage new analysis techniques. In 1968 it became the Laboratoire de recherche des Musées de France, with a national mandate but still located at the Louvre. In 1998, this laboratory merged with the Service de restauration des Musées de France to form the Center for Research and Restoration of Museums of France (C2RMF), located in the Pavillon de Flore.

=== 21st century ===
Several tied cottages still exist in the Pavillon de Flore, including one for the museum's Director. Other apartments in the same pavilion are reserved for senior personnel tasked with the museum's security and maintenance, in case their presence is needed for an emergency.

== Sculpture ==
=== Southern façade ===
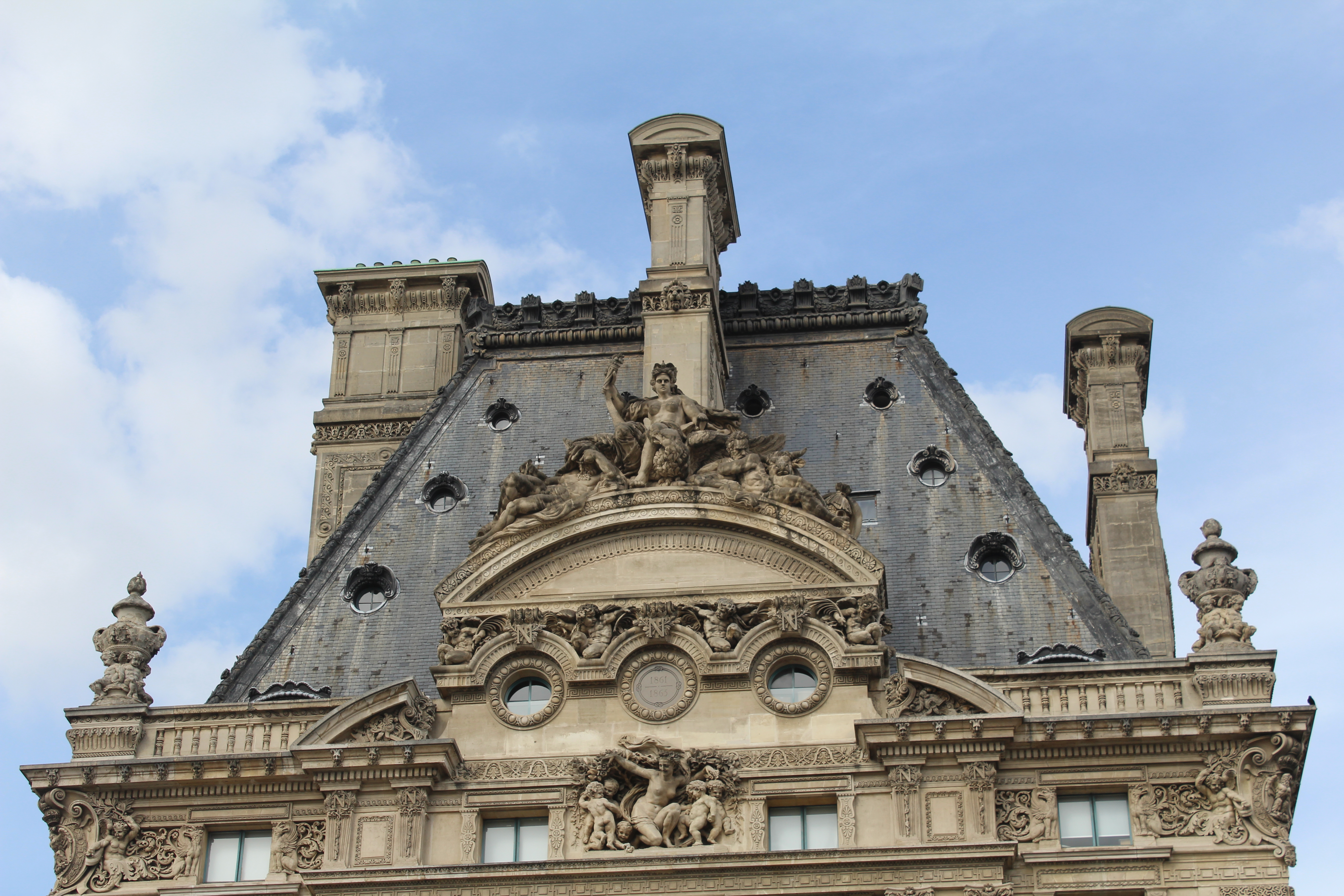
Carpeaux's Imperial France (above the pediment) and Triumph of Flora (below)

In addition to the celebrated Triumph of Flora and above it, Jean-Baptiste Carpeaux sculpted the monumental composition crowning the pavilion's southern pediment. It represents "Imperial France bringing light to the world and protecting Science, Agriculture and Industry" (La France impériale portant la lumière dans le monde et protégeant les Sciences, l'Agriculture et l'Industrie) and was explicitly inspired by Michelangelo's creations in the Medici Chapel of San Lorenzo, Florence. Carpeaux received the commission for that group in 1863, presented the model in May 1865, and executed the sculpture in stone in 1865–1866.

=== Sphinxes of Sebastopol ===
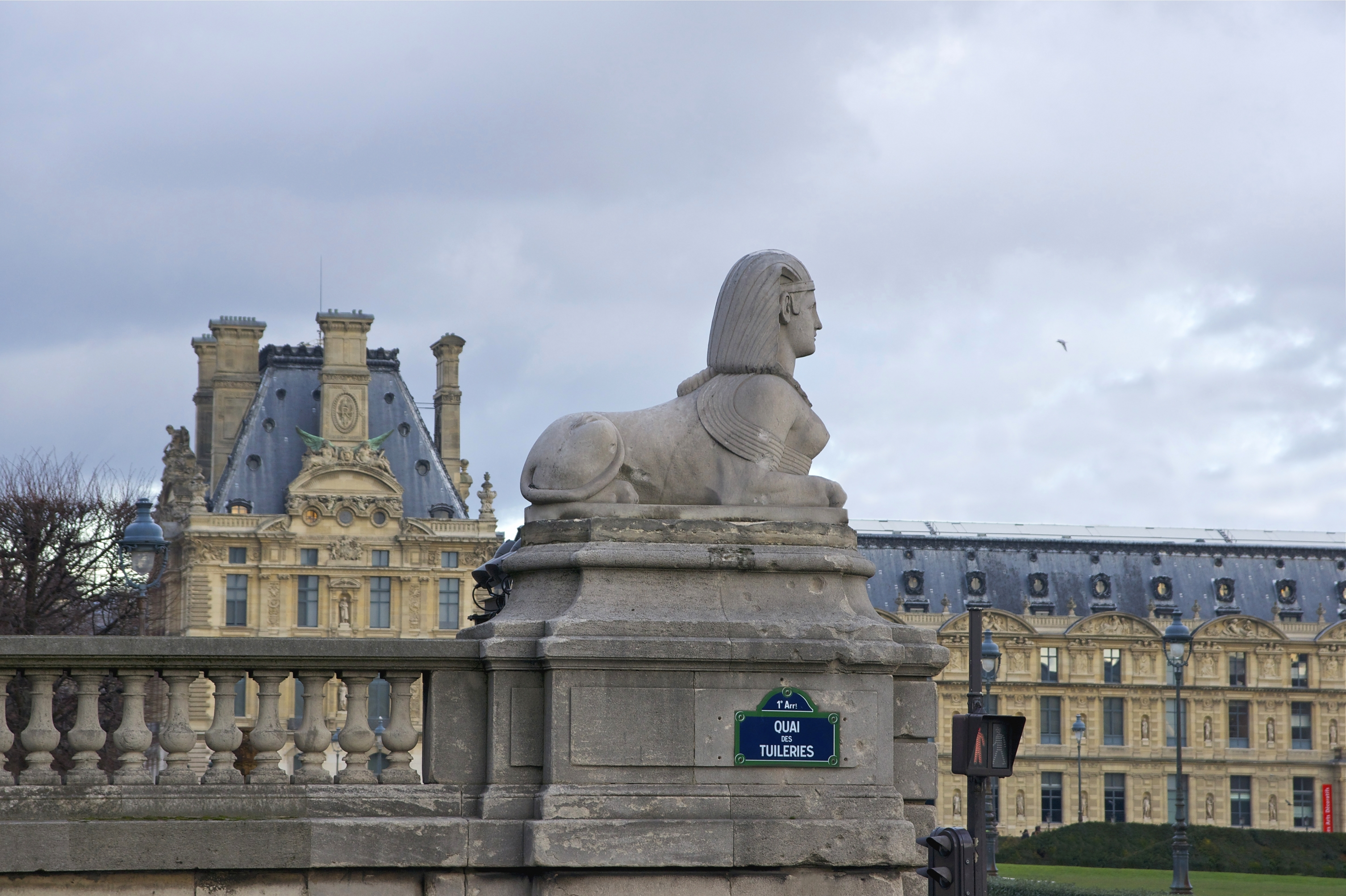
Western sphinx in 2011

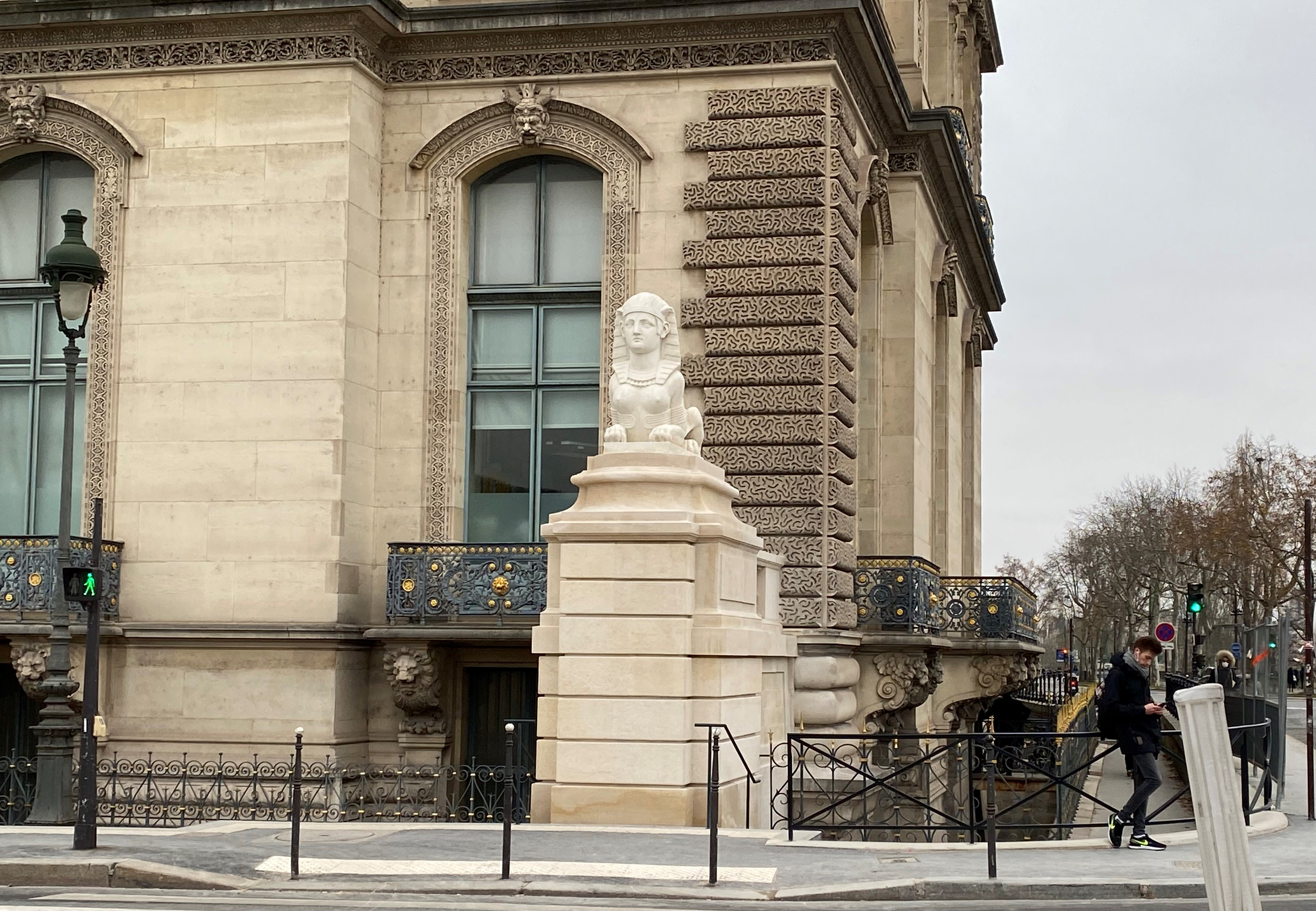
Eastern sphinx in late 2021

Immediately to the pavilion's west are two monumental sphinxes in white marble. They were manufactured in 1845 by the Cammi workshop in Carrara, installed in front of the Naval Library of Sevastopol, and seized there by General Aimable Pélissier in 1855 during the Crimean War. They were brought to Paris as war spoils and initially kept in the Louvre's Assyrian Room, then in front of the recently built Orangerie of the Tuileries, together with other Crimean war spoils. In 1867, on the occasion of Alexander II of Russia's visit of the Exposition Universelle, the sphinges were brought inside the Orangerie to avoid offending the Tsar's sensitivities; later that year, Louvre architect Hector-Martin Lefuel placed them on the sides of the entrance to the private garden of the Tuileries Palace, now part of the Tuileries Garden. In 1877, the western sphinx was moved farther west when that entrance was replaced by the wider rue des Tuileries, now named after General Émile Lemonnier. It bears impacts of shots fired during the Liberation of Paris in August 1944. The eastern sphinx was warehoused in 1986 during the remodeling of the avenue, and reinstalled in August 2021.

These sphinxes inspired John Hay's "The Sphinx of the Tuileries", an anti-Napoleon III poem written during his stay in Paris between 1865 and 1867.

== See also ==
- Pavillon du Roi
- Pavillon de Marsan
