= Wilmer Herrison =

Venezuelan artist (born 1978)

- Born: September 29, 1978 (age 47) Maracaibo, Venezuela
- Occupation: Painter
- Education: École du Louvre

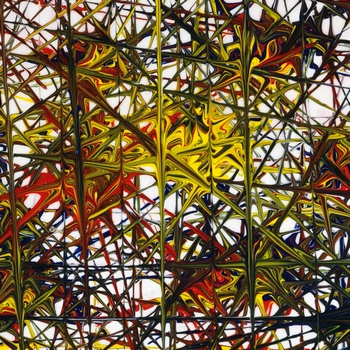
Patria WH 2009

Wilmer Herrison (born September 29, 1978) is a Venezuelan artist currently based in Paris. He is the creator of a modern art influenced by both European and South American traditions.

== Biography ==
Harrison was born in Maracaibo (Zulia State, Venezuela) on September 29, 1978. At 23, he moved to France where he studied at the École du Louvre. At 32, he received an early recognition in his home country, exposing the same year in two national museums, the Barquisimeto Museum and the Museum of Modern Art Juan Astorga Anta in Mérida, Venezuela.

In 2010, during his exhibition "Serenissima" in Venice, he meets the Italian designer Piero Massaro, who, inspired by his paintings, created a collection of eyeglasses called Collezione WH.

== Work and exhibitions ==
A first series of works was gathered in 2010 at the Exposition Pachamama, starting in Venice and presented then in Venezuela. Pachamama represents the goddess Mother Earth. A second series of works has been exhibited from May 2010 under the name of Serenissima (Venice). This exhibition gathered the paintings inspired by the story of "La Dominante" (Serenissima, Fonderia dell'Arsenale, Martirio di San Marco, Palazzo,...), by its traditions (Vogalonga, Maschera,...), while others give a representation of nature (Laguna, Bora, High water, Twilight II,...)

In the year 2011, a new collection, called Optical Fusion, has been exhibited in Venice, Italy (Palazzo delle Prigioni), then in the Museum of Barquisimeto (Venezuela) and in the MACZUL, Museum of Contemporary Art of Zulia, Maracaibo, Venezuela.

== Exhibitions ==
- April 2018 - Present: Reflect Optique, TOROSIETE Museum of Contemporary Art
- July 28 – October 9, 2011 : Encuentros, Museo de Arte Contemporaneo del Zulia (MACZUL), Maracaibo, Estado – Zulia, Venezuela
- July 17 – November 17, 2011 : Encuentros, Museo de Barquisimeto (Estado – Lara, Venezuela)
- March 27 – April 12, 2011: Encuentros, Palazzo delle Prigioni (San Marcos), Sestiere Castello 4209, Venice (Italy)
- July 16 – September 15. 2010: Pachamama in the Museum of Modern Art in Mérida (Venezuela)
- May 1–27, 2010: Serenissima Spazio Eventi Mondadori Bookstore in San Marco, Venice (Italy)
- April 18 – June 30, 2010: Pachamama – Museum of Barquisimeto (Venezuela)
- January 30 to February 28, 2010: Pachamama Santa Cosma e Damiano, Giudecca Island, Venice
