= École du Louvre =

Grande École in Paris, France

Coordinates: 48.8608°N 2.33222°E

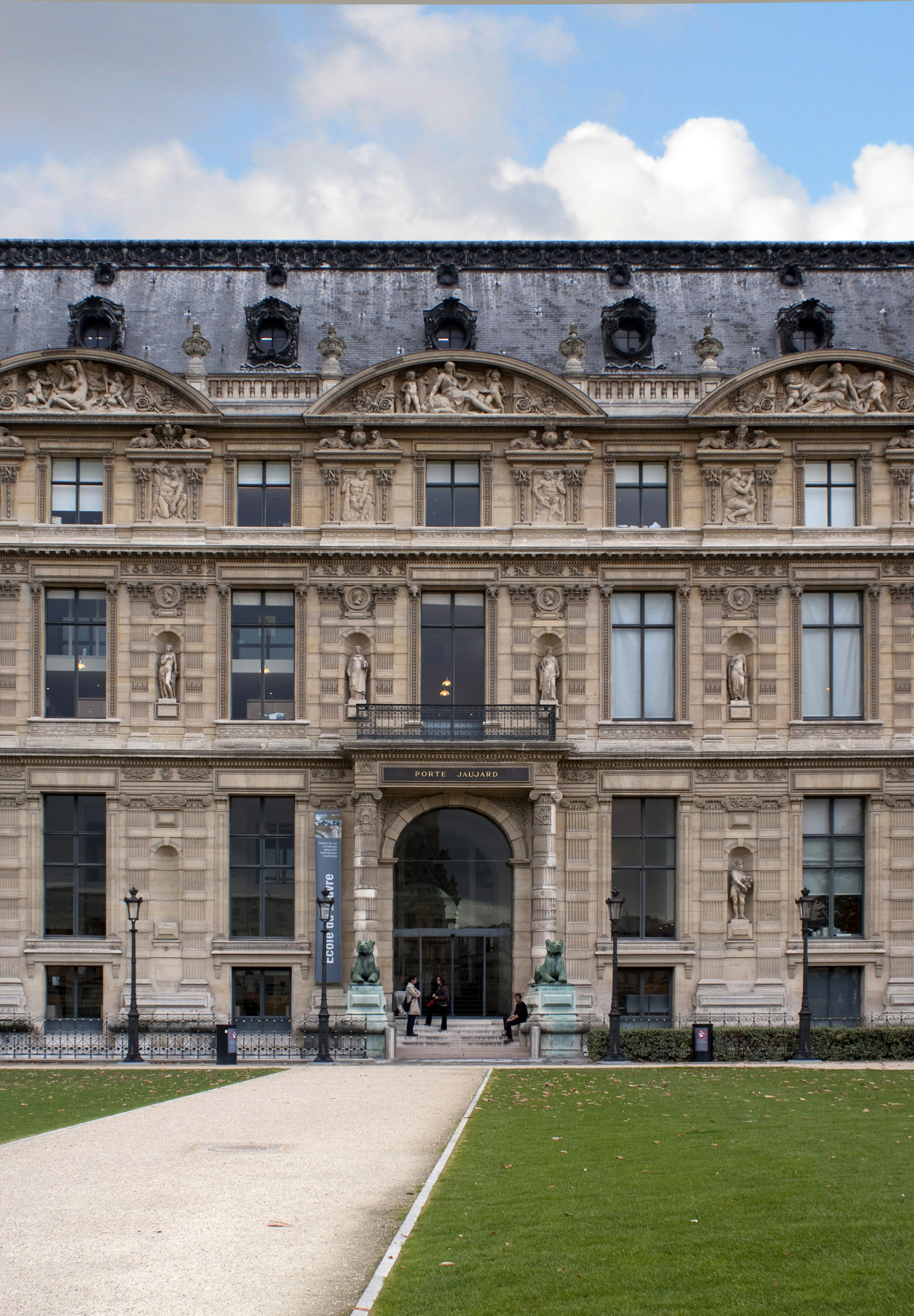
- Type: Public
- Established: 1882
- Dean: Claire Barbillon
- Undergraduates: 1200
- Postgraduates: 400
- Location: Paris, France
- Website: https://www.ecoledulouvre.fr/

The École du Louvre (French pronunciation: [ekɔl dy luvʁ]) is a selective institution of higher education and prestigious grande école located in the Aile de Flore of the Louvre Palace in Paris, France. It is dedicated to the study of archaeology, art history, anthropology and epigraphy.

Admission is based on a competitive entrance exam after secondary school (lycée), though candidates may also apply after two or three years of university studies in the subjects of history, classics, literature, geography, philosophy and art. The school offers an undergraduate programme, a master's programme and a doctoral programme as well as a preparation class for civil service entrance exams.

== History ==
The École du Louvre was created in 1882 with the mission to "extract from the collections the knowledge they contain, and to train curators, missionaries and excavators". The school was originally dedicated to archaeology, but soon expanded to related disciplines, such as history of art, anthropology and ancient languages.

The school was created in a context of expansion of higher education in Europe, and in France in particular, which was reflected by providing lectures to the general public in addition to providing an education to students. Public lectures and conferences aimed at fee-paying "auditors", and summer school, continues the tradition on which the school was based.

Other prestigious institutions were created during the same period in France, such as the Institut d'études politiques de Paris (Sciences-Po) or the École des Hautes Études Commerciales (HEC).

In 1920, the school established the General Art History course (known as HGA), that became the foundation for the curriculum. This course would develop into the current graduate programme over the following years.

In 1927, the school was innovative by creating the chair of museology, the first such in the world.

The school was continuously located in the Louvre Palace. For most of the 20th century, it used spaces facing the Seine beneath the Grande Galerie and around the inner courtyard now known as cour Visconti. In 1998, as these spaces were earmarked for the museum expansion known as the Grand Louvre, the school moved to its present location in the Aile de Flore.

The École nationale supérieure des Beaux-Arts or the Ecole Boulle are also well known art institutions in France.

== Teaching ==
The entrance hall in the École du Louvre

As of 2006, the École du Louvre complies with the Bologna process and offers an undergraduate degree after three years (Premier Cycle), a master's degree after two years (Deuxième cycle) and a research degree in three years (Troisième Cycle). It also provides preparation classes for some civil service exams as well as conferences for a wider public. Altogether, there are about 700 teaching staff.

=== Premier cycle ===
Undergraduate students follow a core course called HGA (General Art History studying various periods and areas). Lectures are held in an amphitheatre, and tutorials are held in various museums providing a "hands-on" experience with the material.

The first year is dedicated to the Antiquity, with an emphasis on Prehistoric, Classical and Oriental Archaeology.

The second year focuses on the History of Art and Archaeology of the non-Western world, as well as the study of the Middle Ages and Renaissance.

The final year focuses on the History of Art in modern times, and African and Oceana Art including Anthropology.

In addition to the core course, in their first year students choose a specialisation area to study for the duration of the degree, known as cours organiques or spé. Currently 31 specialisations (or cours organiques) exist such as painting, drawing, sculpture, engraving, furniture, architecture, industrial design, cinema, fashion, photography created in various areas all over the world such as in Europe, Africa, America, Oceania or Middle and Far East. Students also take courses in Epigraphy, Numismatics or Modern Languages.

=== Deuxième cycle ===
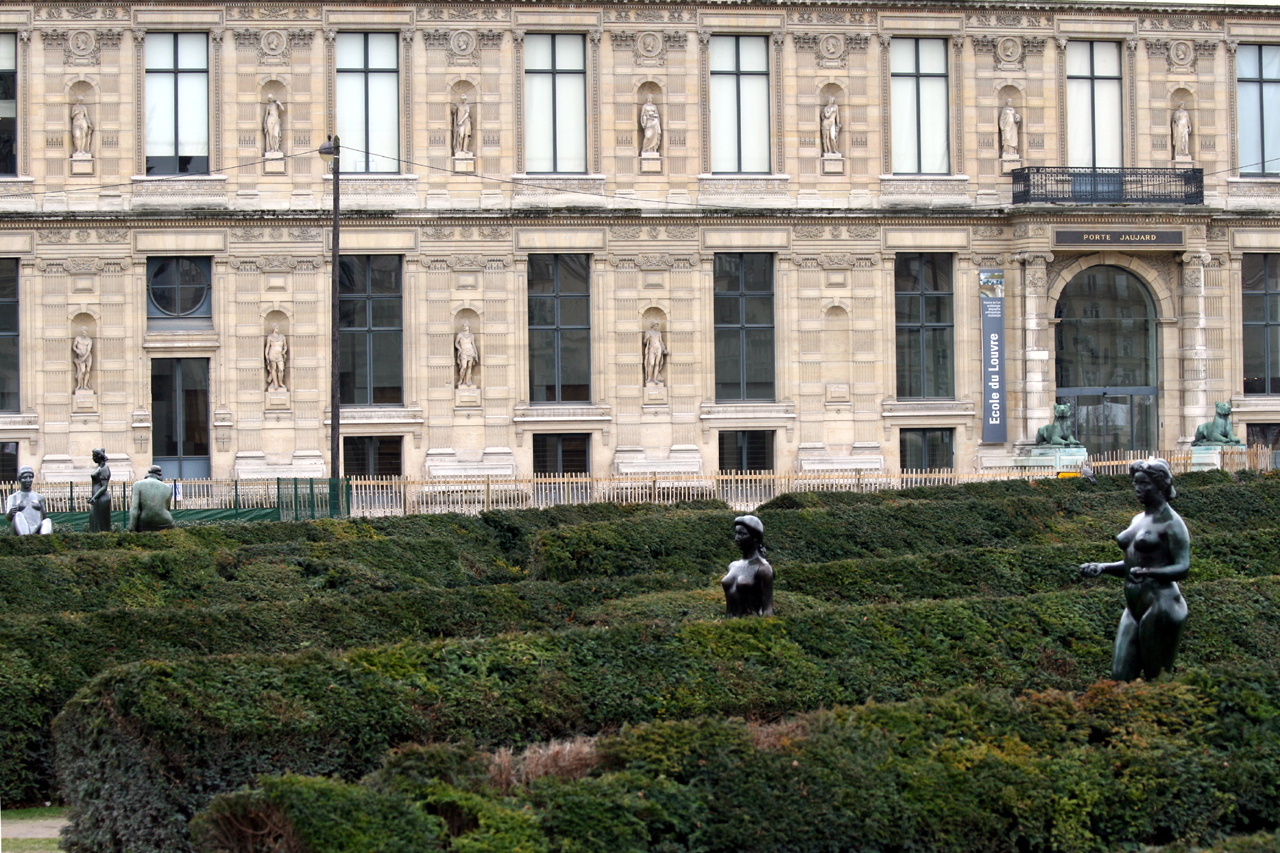
The Aile de Flore, the Ecole du Louvre's frontage

The master's programme is composed of two years. During the first year, students study museology and research methods. At the end of the second year, students submit a master's thesis highlighting research and work experience.

=== Troisième cycle ===
Although the research programme is not formally a doctoral programme, delivering a diplôme de recherche approfondie instead, students spend the three or more years conducting extensive academic research under the direction of a supervisor from the École du Louvre.

== Academic partnerships ==
=== Partnerships in France ===
In France, the École du Louvre signed a double-diploma partnership with ESSEC Business School in 2010, and then with Sciences Po in 2014.

Since 2007, it has also offered a joint course with Paris-Sud University, leading to a university diploma in legal studies for students at the École du Louvre, and three certificates in general art history (CGHA) for students at the university. The École du Louvre also partners with other public and private institutions as part of seminar exchanges.

=== International Partnerships ===
The École du Louvre has an extensive exchange agreements programme, including Columbia University, Princeton University, the University of St Andrews, the University of Bologna and the Scuola Normale Superiore di Pisa, the Istituto Veneto di Scienze, Lettere ed Arti in Venice, Italy and the University of Heidelberg in Germany.

== Library and publications ==
The École du Louvre possesses one of the largest Art History and Archeology collections, which is made available to academics and students.

The École du Louvre regularly publishes books, manuals and academic research, often in conjunction with an external publishing house.
