= Pont de la Concorde (Paris) =

Bridge in Paris, France

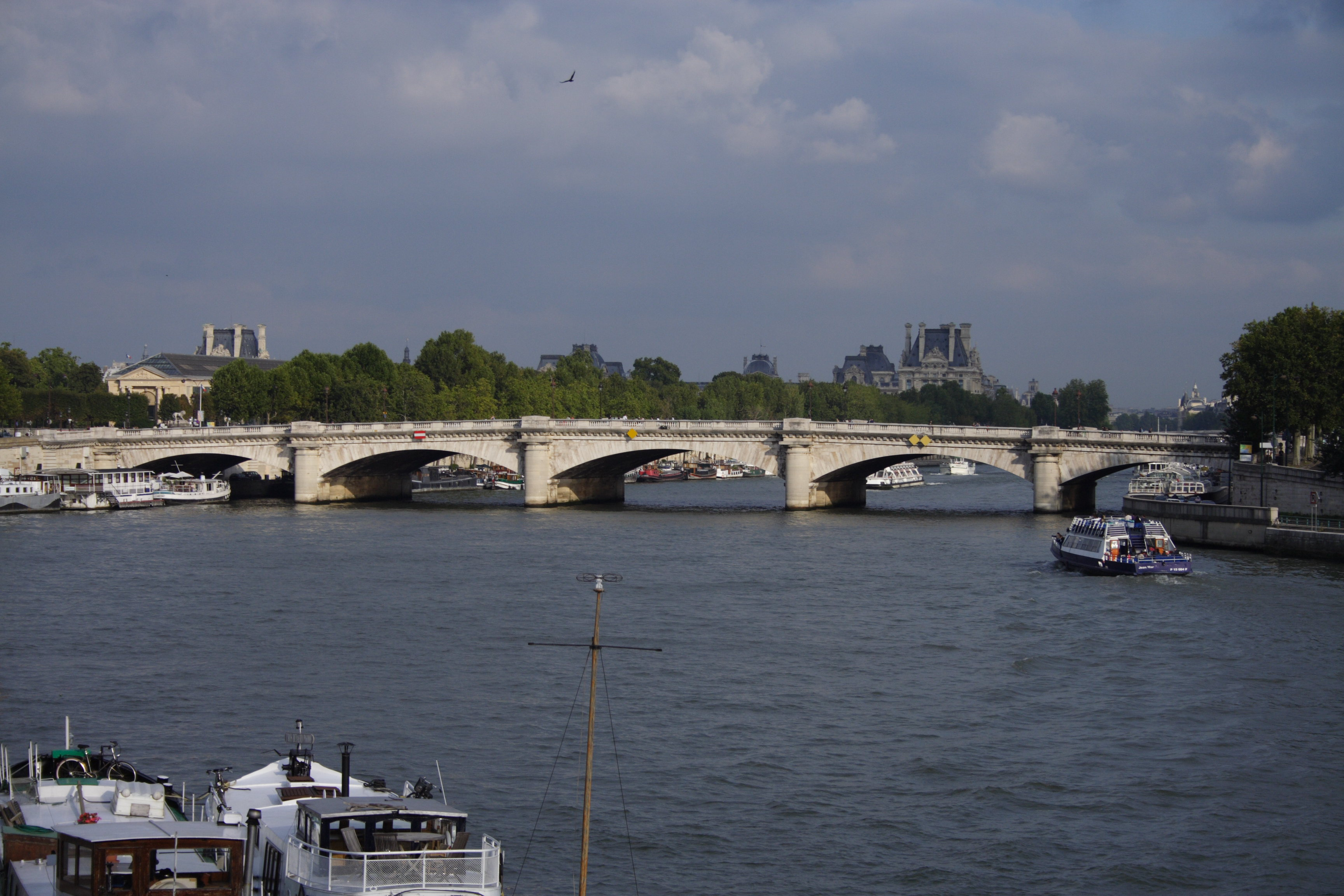
- The Pont de la Concorde with the musée de l'Orangerie (left) and the Louvre in the background
- Coordinates: 48°51′48.32″N 02°19′10.49″E
- Crosses: Seine
- Locale: Paris, France
- Next upstream: Passerelle Léopold- Sédar-Senghor
- Next downstream: Pont Alexandre III

Characteristics
- Design: Jean-Rodolphe Perronet
- Total length: 153 metres (502 ft)
- Width: 18 metres (59 ft)

History
- Construction start: 1787
- Opened: 1791

The Pont de la Concorde is an arch bridge across the Seine in Paris connecting the Quai des Tuileries at the Place de la Concorde (on the Rive Droite) and the Quai d'Orsay (on the Rive Gauche). It has formerly been known as the "Pont Louis XVI", "Pont de la Révolution", "Pont de la Concorde", "Pont Louis XVI" again during the Bourbon Restoration (1814); in 1830, its name was changed again to Pont de la Concorde, the name it has retained to this day. It is served by the Metro stations Assemblée nationale and Concorde.

== Situation ==
Location on the Seine

The bridge is located on the border between the 7th and 8th arrondissement of Paris. The Pont Alexandre III is the next bridge downstream; the Passerelle Léopold-Sédar-Senghor is the next bridge upstream.

== History ==
=== Construction ===
The architect Jean-Rodolphe Perronet was commissioned in 1787 with this new bridge. It had been planned since 1755, when construction of "place Louis XV" (now "place de la Concorde") began, to replace the ferry that crossed the river at that point. Construction continued in the midst of the turmoil of the French Revolution, using the dimension stones taken from the demolished Bastille (taken by force on 14 July 1789) for its masonry. It was completed in 1791.

=== 19th century ===
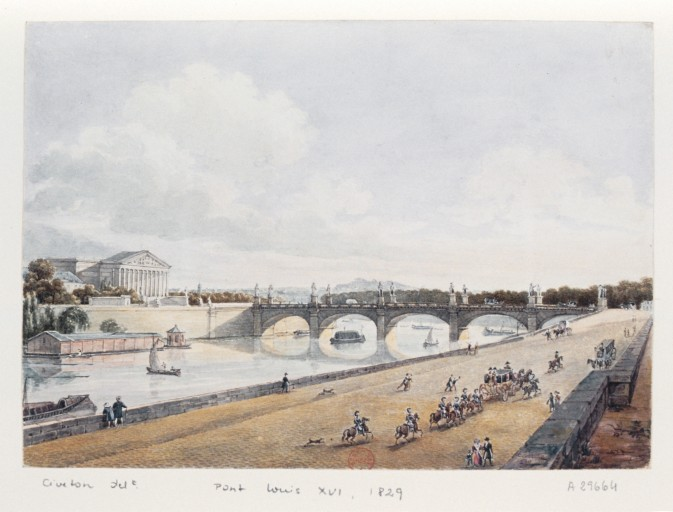
The bridge in 1829, with the 12 statues

In 1810, Napoleon placed along the sides of the bridge the statues of eight French generals killed in battle during the campaigns of the First French Empire. On the Bourbon Restoration these were replaced with twelve monumental marble statues, including four of the "grands ministres" (Suger, Sully, Richelieu, Colbert), four royal generals (Du Guesclin, Bayard, Condé, Turenne) and four sailors (Duguay-Trouin, Duquesne, Suffren, Tourville). However, this collection of statues proved too heavy for the bridge, and Louis-Philippe I had them removed and transferred to Versailles.

=== 20th–21st centuries ===
Traffic across the bridge became very congested and the bridge had to be widened on both sides between 1930 and 1932, doubling the width of the original bridge. The engineers Deval and Malet nevertheless took care to preserve the neoclassical architecture of the original. It was renovated one last time in 1983. Today, this bridge bears the brunt of Paris's road traffic (except for those of the Boulevard Périphérique).
