= Pont Royal =

Bridge

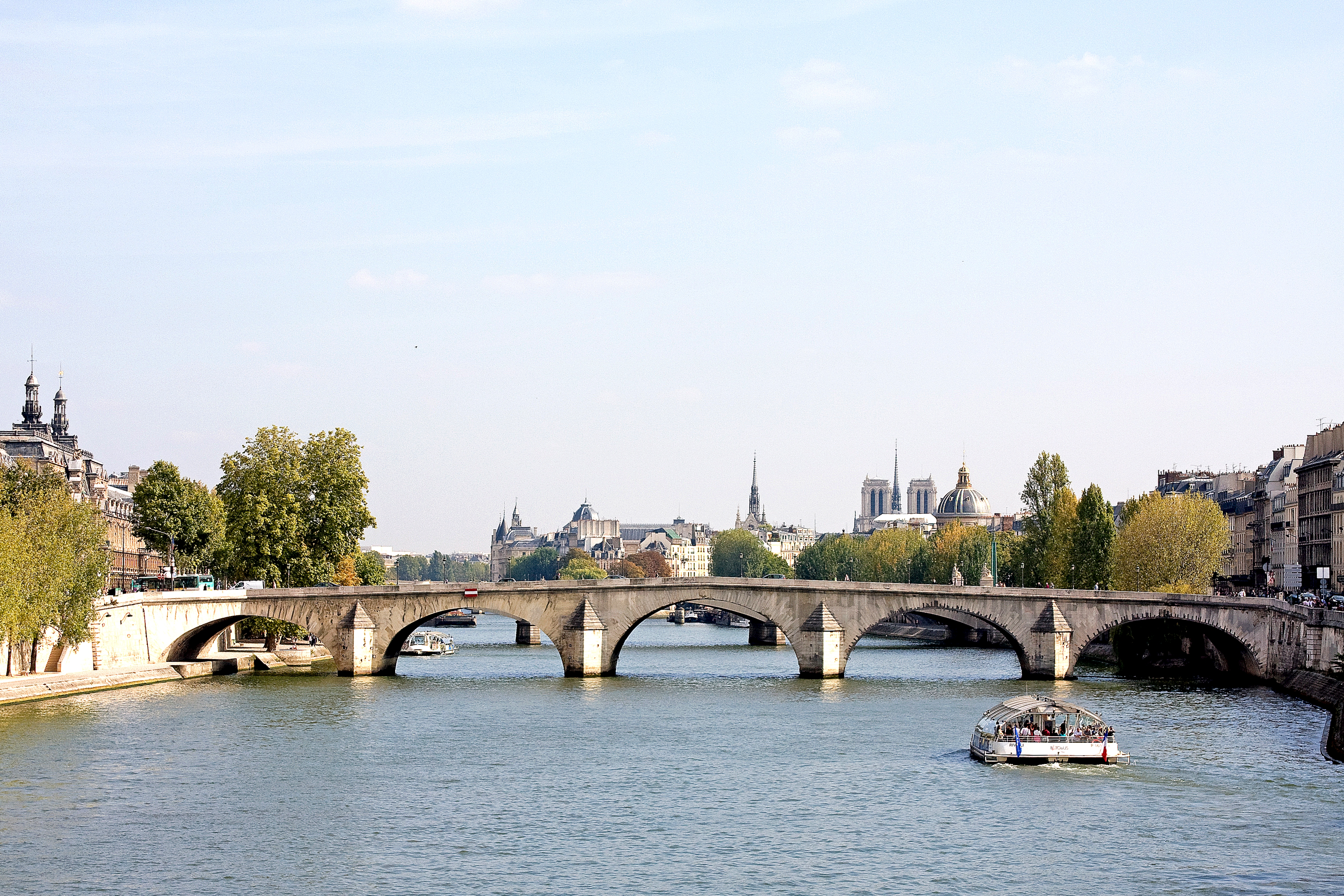
- Pont Royal
- Coordinates: 48°51′36.35″N 02°19′47.56″E
- Carries: Motor vehicles, pedestrians, and bicycles
- Crosses: The Seine River
- Locale: Paris, France
- Next upstream: Pont du Carrousel
- Next downstream: Passerelle Léopold -Sédar-Senghor

Characteristics
- Design: Arch Bridge
- Total length: 110 m
- Width: 17 m

History
- Construction start: 1685
- Construction end: 1689

Statistics
- Toll: Free both ways

Location
- Interactive map of Pont Royal

The Pont Royal is a bridge crossing the river Seine in Paris. It is the third oldest bridge in Paris, after the Pont Neuf and the Pont Marie.

== Location ==
The Pont Royal links the Right Bank by the Pavillon de Flore with the Left Bank of Paris between rue du Bac and the rue de Beaune. The bridge is constructed with five elliptical arches en plein cintre. A hydrographic ladder, indicating floods' highest level in Paris, is visible on the last pier nearest each bank.

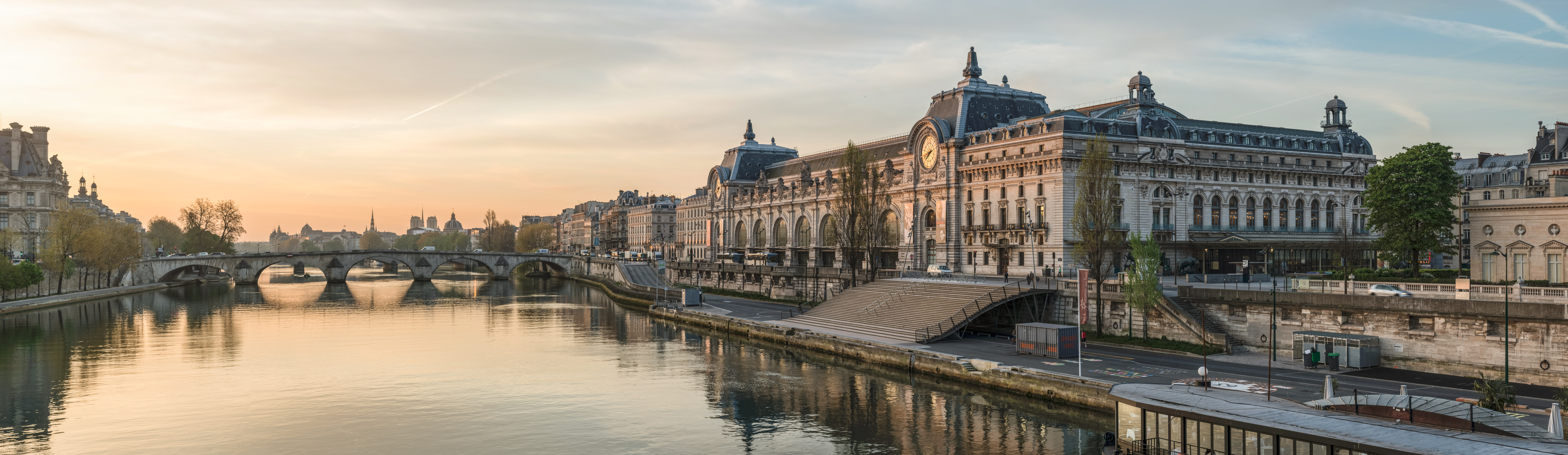
Musée d'Orsay and Pont Royal

== Access ==
Located near the Métro station: Tuileries.

== History ==
In 1632, the entrepreneur Pierre Pidou directed the construction of a wooden toll-bridge which would be called Pont Sainte-Anne (in deference to Anne of Austria) or Pont Rouge (due to its color). It was designed to replace the Tuileries ferry upon which the rue du Bac (bac meaning ferry in French) owes its name. The ferry had been offering crossings since 1550. Fragile, this bridge of fifteen arches would be repaired for the first time in 1649, completely redone two years later, burnt in 1654, flooded in 1656, completely rebuilt in 1660, propped up in 1673 and finally carried away by a flood in February 1684. Madame de Sévigné reported that this last incident caused the loss of eight of the bridge's arches.

The bridge was finally reconstructed between 25 October 1685 and 13 June 1689, this time with stone, receiving complete financing from King Louis XIV. It was the king who gave it the name Pont Royal. Louvois, director of the Bâtiments du Roi, charged Jacques Gabriel, Jules Hardouin-Mansart and François Romain with the construction project. In the 18th century, the bridge was a popular meeting place for various festivities and celebrations.

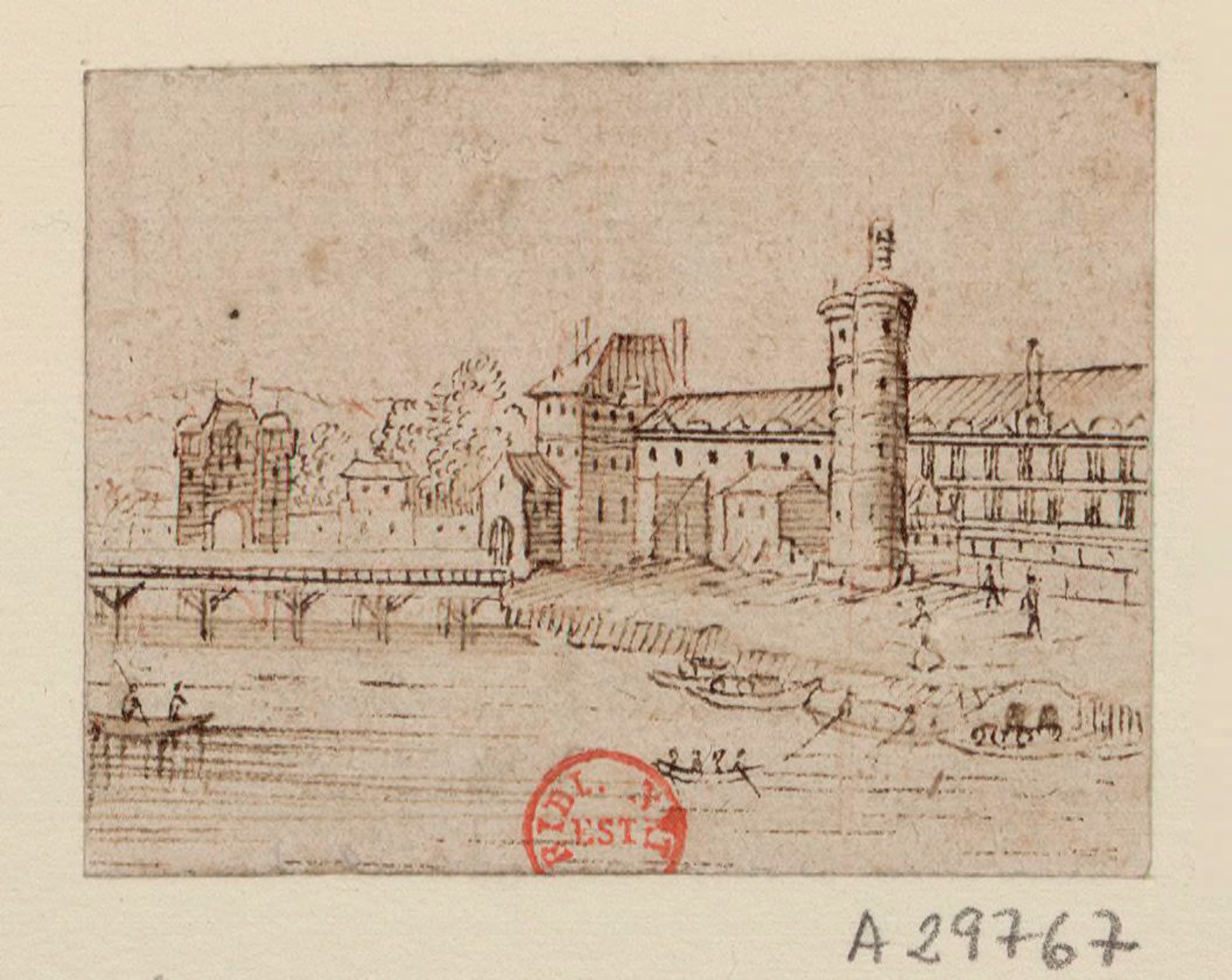
Le Pont Rouge

At the time of the French Revolution, in the period following the fall of the monarchy on 10 August 1792 and the beginning of the First French Empire in 1804 - the name of Pont Royal was changed to Pont National. During that period, General Napoléon Bonaparte (future Napoléon I, Emperor of the French) had cannons installed on the bridge in order to protect the Convention Nationale and the Committee of Public Safety, housed in the Tuileries Palace.

During the First French Empire (1804–1814), Napoléon I renamed the bridge the Pont des Tuileries, a name that was kept until the Restoration in 1814 when Louis XVIII gave back to the bridge its royal name.

The bridge underwent a last reconstruction in 1850. In 1939, it was classified as a monument historique.

In 2005, the Pont Royal was illuminated by lights at night as one of the Paris Olympic Bid highlights.

== Gallery ==
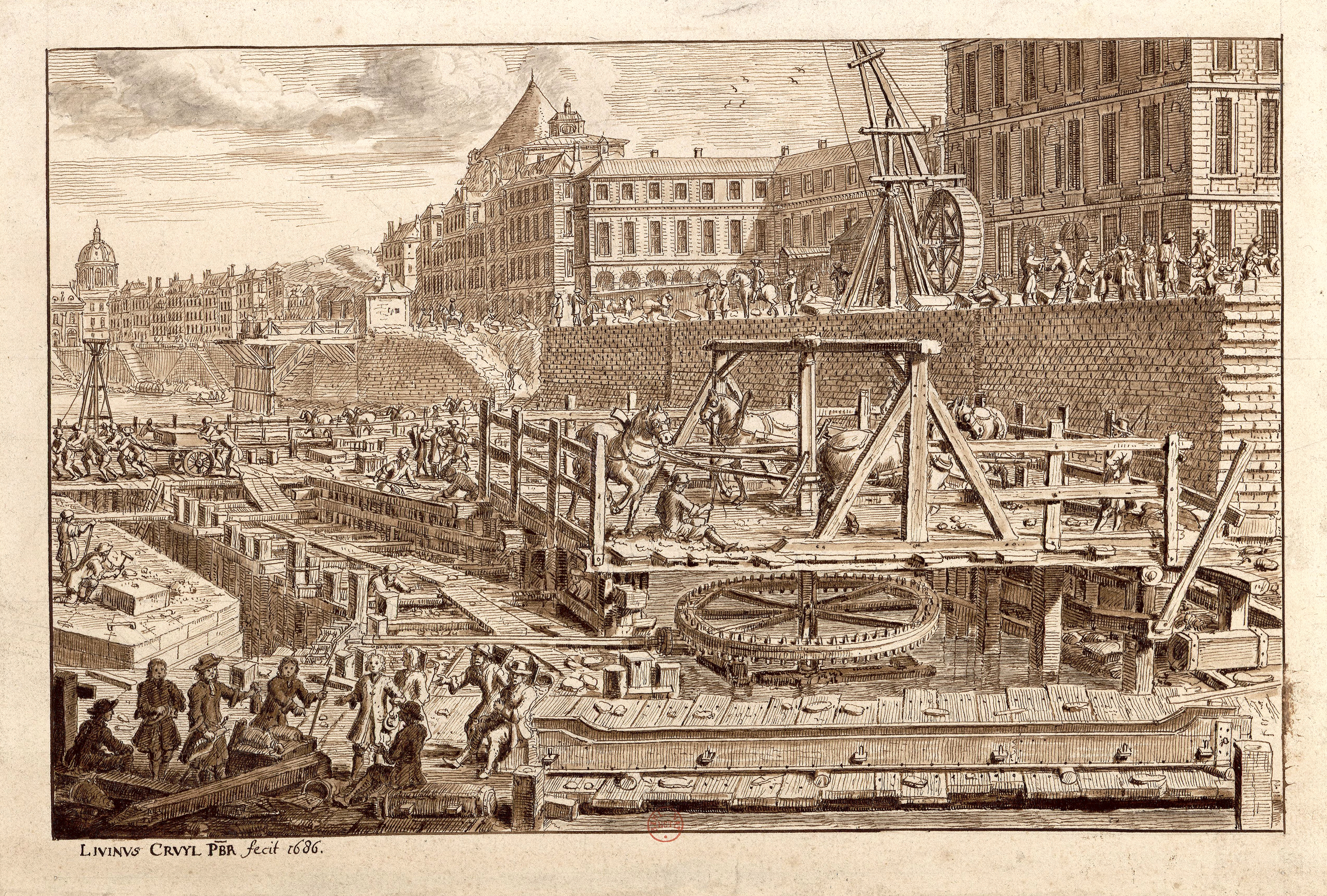
Construction of the bridge in 1686

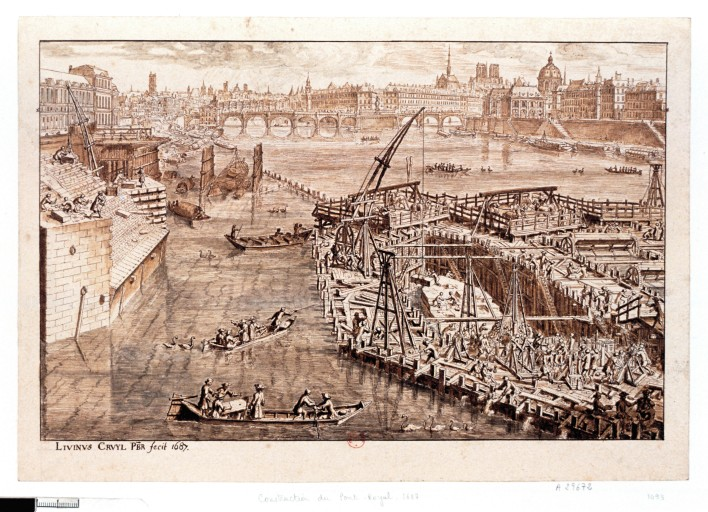
Construction of the bridge in 1687

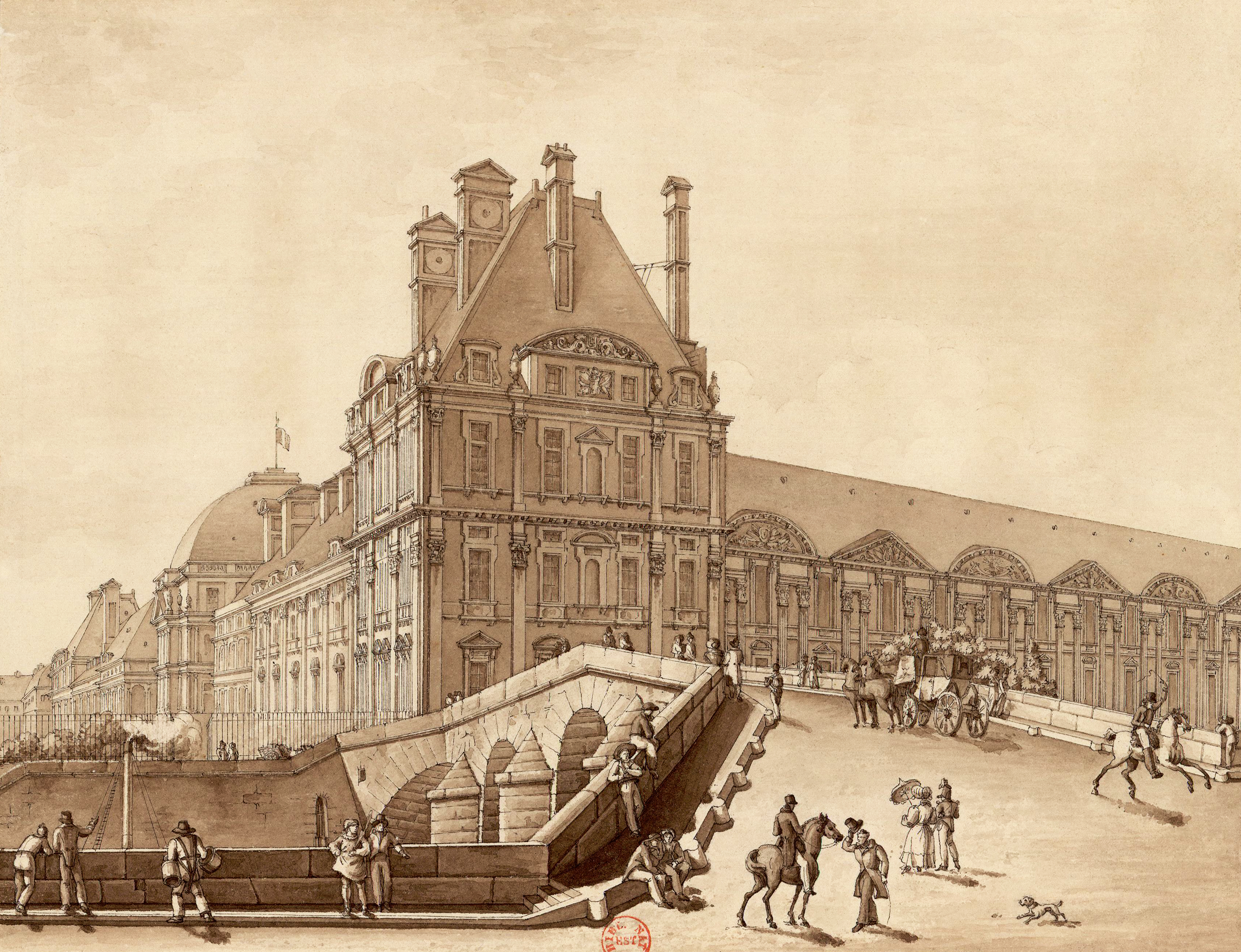
The bridge and the Pavillon de Flore in 1814

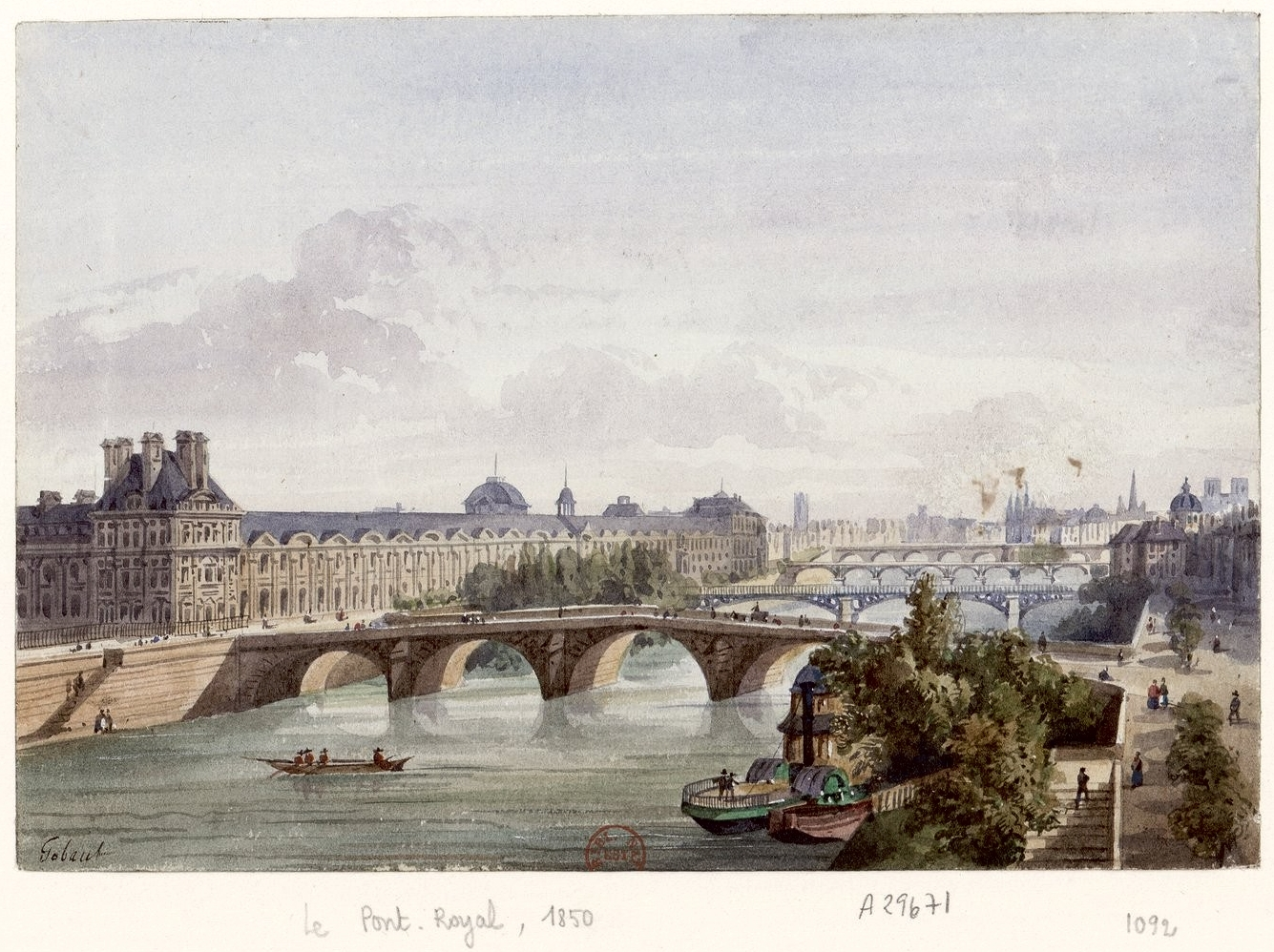
The Pont Royal in 1850

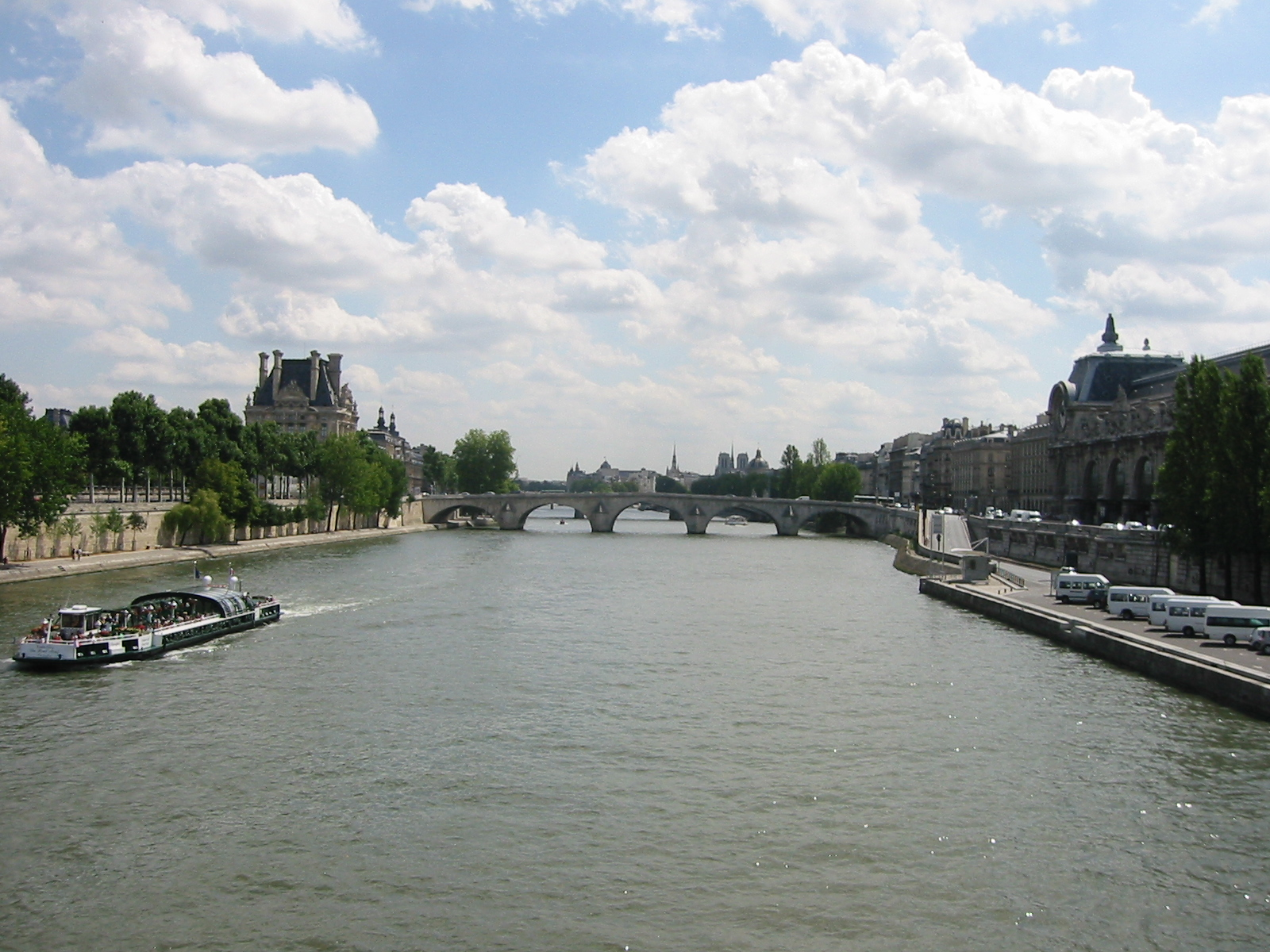
View from the Passerelle Solférino

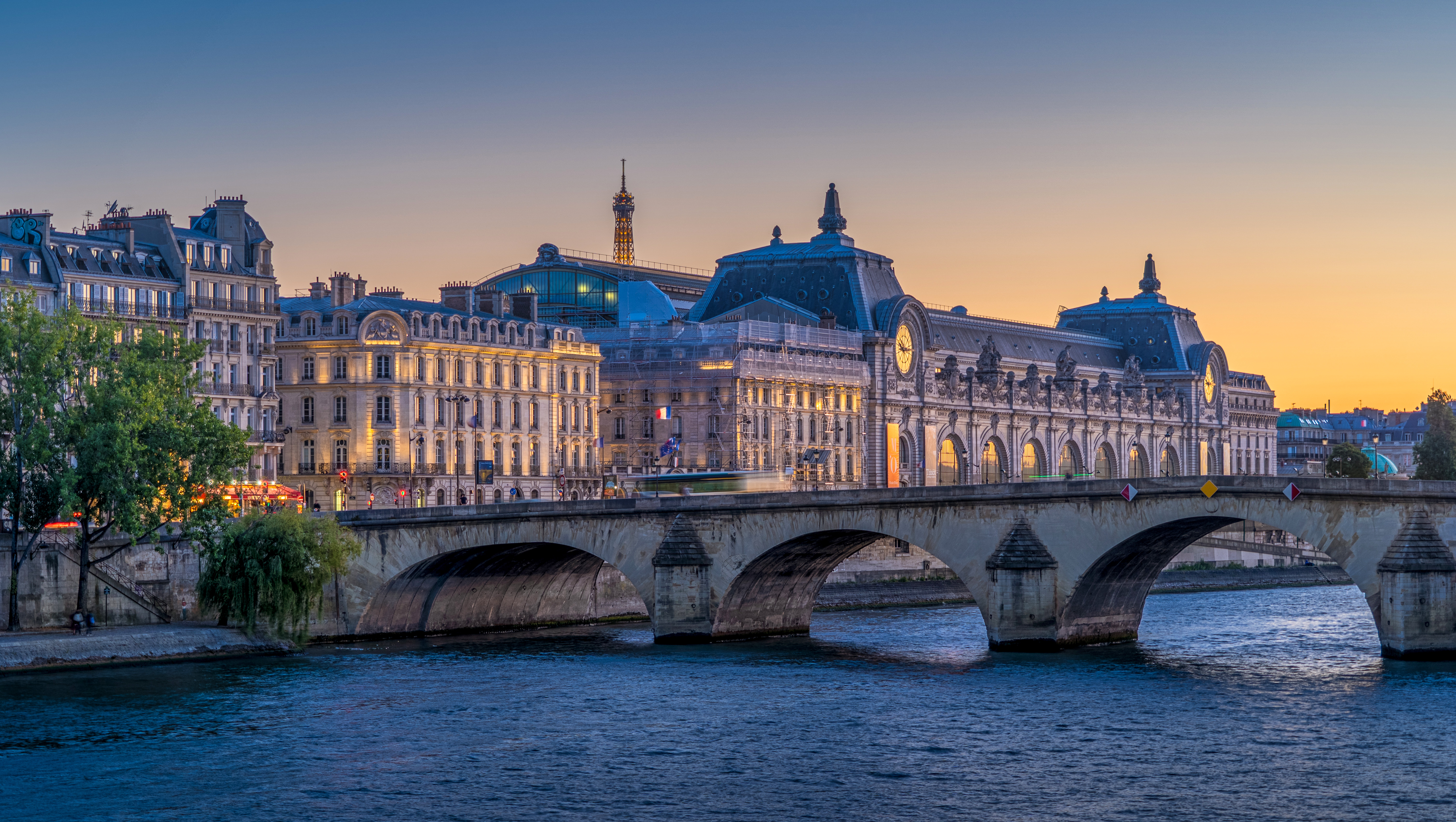
Pont Royal and Musée d'Orsay

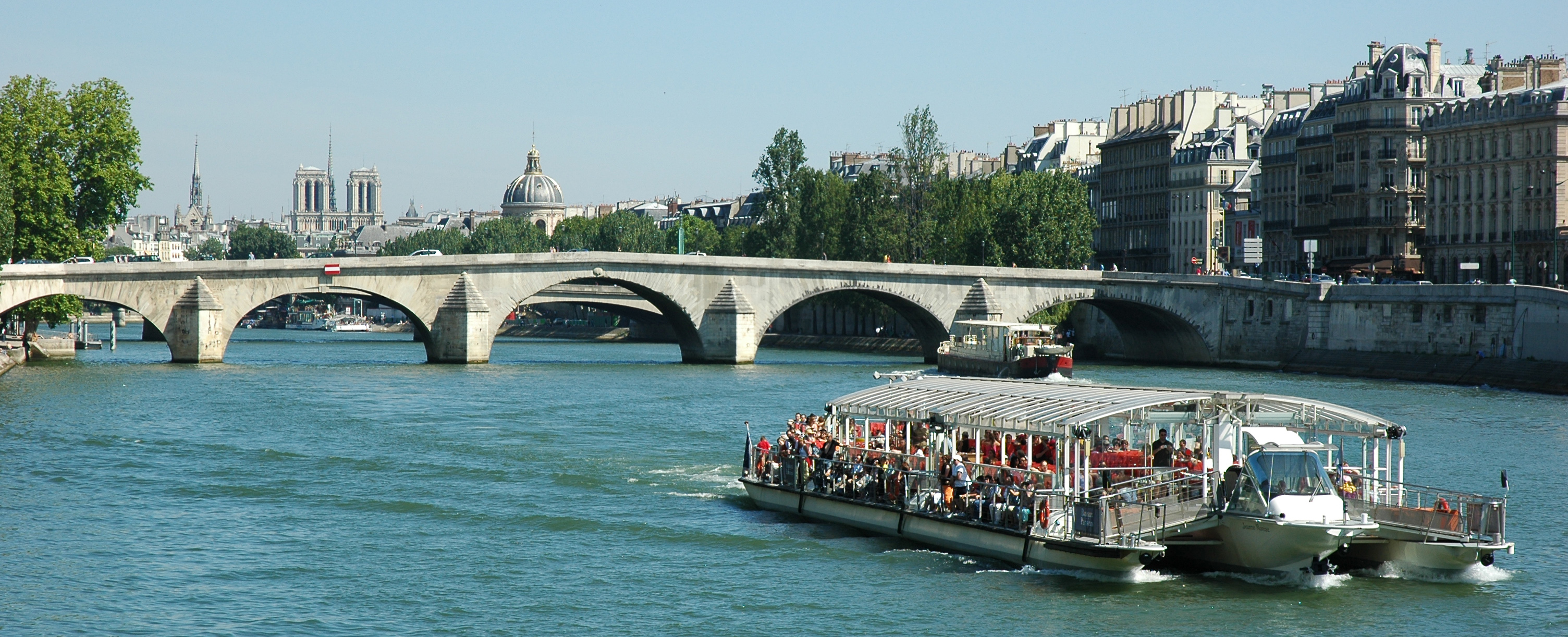

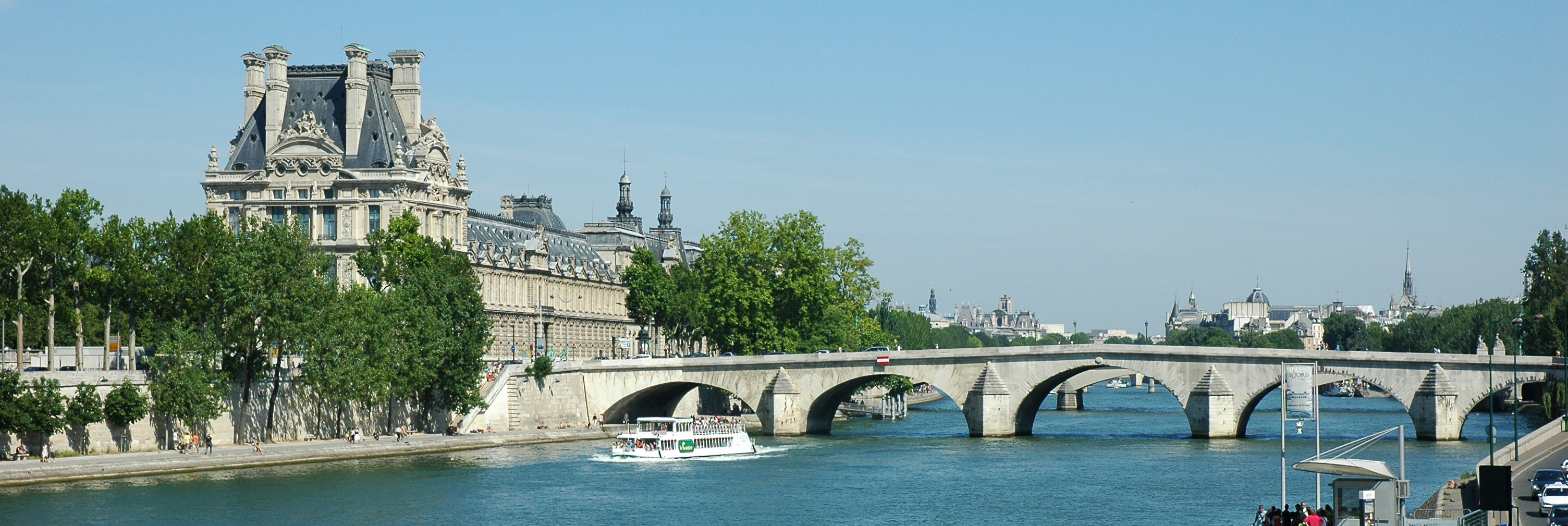

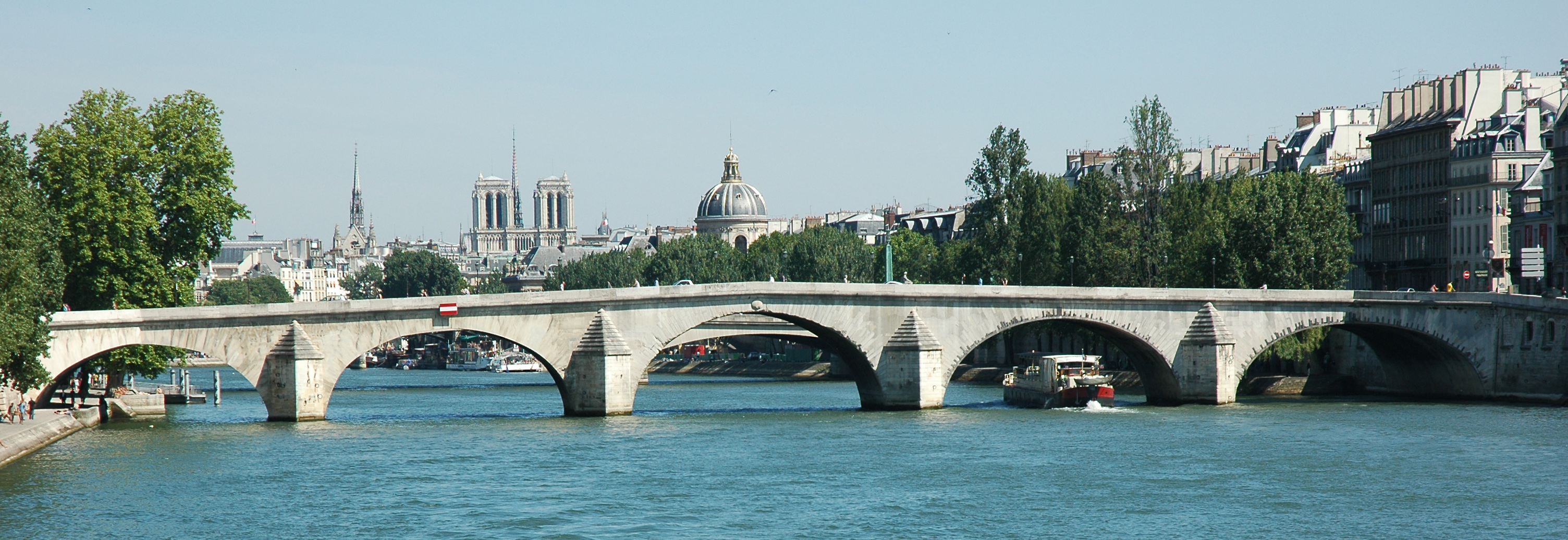

== See also ==
- List of crossings of the River Seine
