= François Romain =

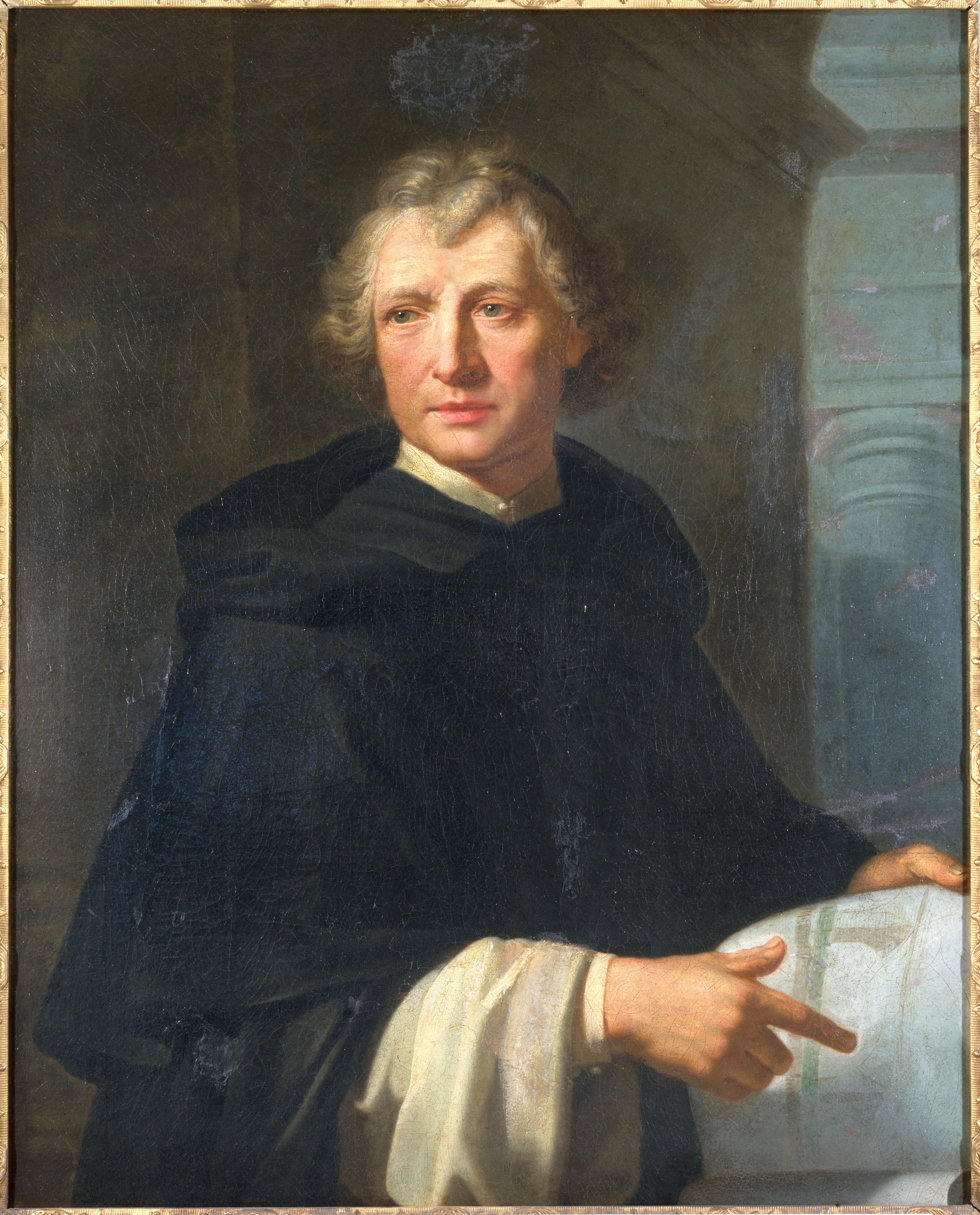
Portrait by Jean André, c. 1690

François Romain, also known by his Flemish name Francis Rooman or his latinised name Franciscus Romanus (Ghent 22 March 1646 – Paris 7 January 1737), was an engineer-architect who was professed as a lay brother Dominican friar. By commission of the States General of the Netherlands, in 1683 he reconstructed parts of the ancient St. Servatius Bridge at Maastricht, crossing the river Meuse in nine arches. Successful in this undertaking, for which dredging was required, he was requested to come to Paris, where he resided in the monastery of Saint-Thomas-d'Aquin, and oversaw the completion of the Pont Royal, which had been designed by Jules Hardouin-Mansart, with a central arch having a span of 23.5 meters. Record of payments to him beginning 1 April 1685, three weeks after the contract was awarded, showed that, contrary to the traditional account that he was not brought in until trouble had been encountered, he was the specialist in the project from the beginning. Dredging the Seine's riverbed was required in order to establish sound footings, and caissons were employed for the deep foundations here for the first time, half a century before Charles Labélye's use of them at Westminster Bridge, London. Construction proceeded without incident and was completed and the bridge formally opened, 13–14 June 1689. This further success procured him the office of inspector of bridges and embankments in Paris.
