= Passerelle Léopold-Sédar-Senghor =

Bridge in Paris, France

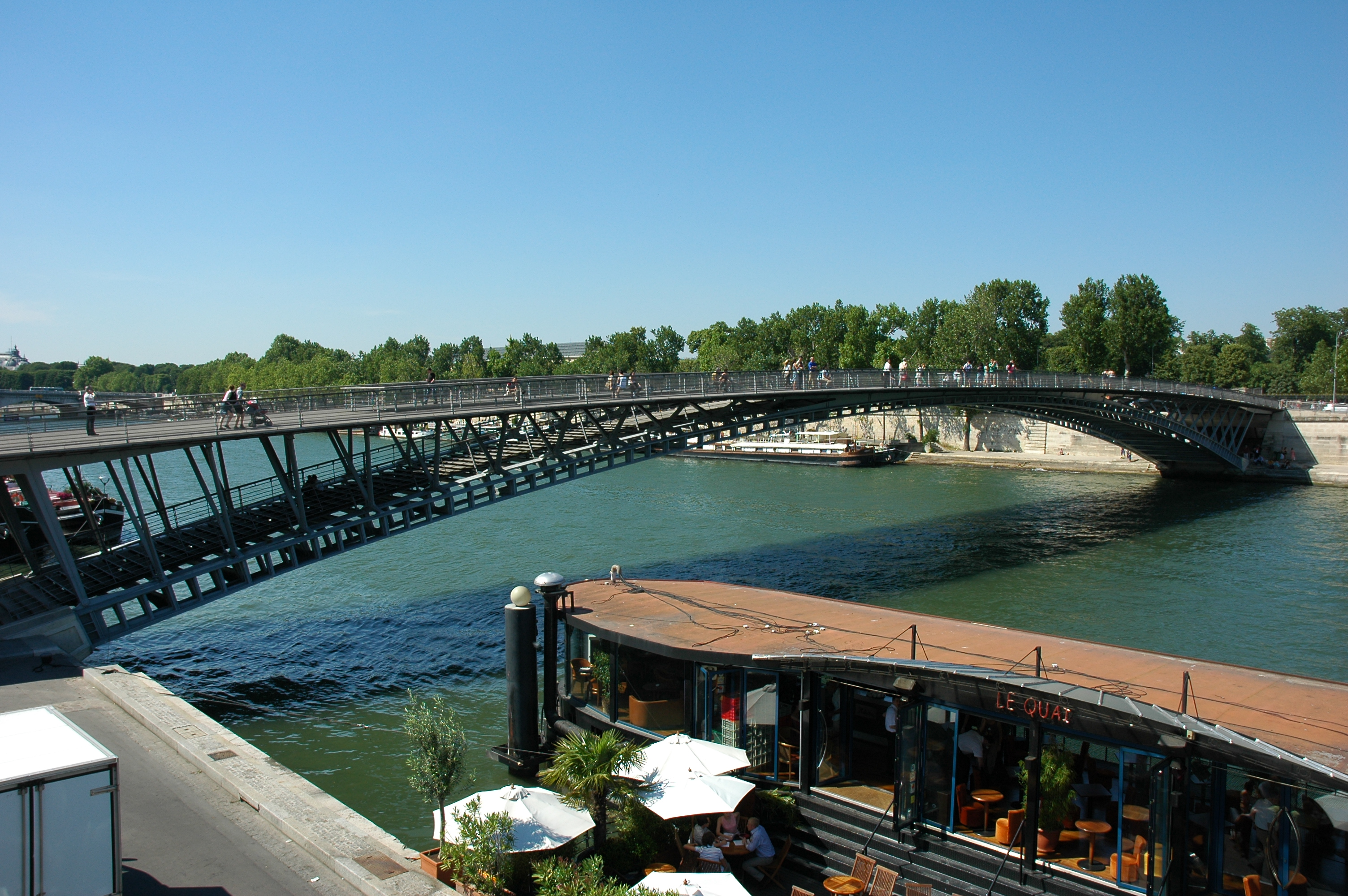
- Coordinates: 48°51′43″N 02°19′29″E
- Crosses: River Seine
- Locale: Paris, France
- Next upstream: Pont Royal
- Next downstream: Pont de la Concorde

Characteristics
- Design: Marc Mimram
- Total length: 106 m
- Width: 15 m

History
- Construction start: 1997
- Construction end: 1999
- Opened: 1999

Location
- Interactive map of Passerelle Léopold-Sédar-Senghor

Passerelle Léopold-Sédar-Senghor, formerly known as Passerelle Solférino (or Pont de Solférino), is a footbridge over the River Seine between the 1st and 7th arrondissements of Paris. Opened in 1999, it was renamed after Léopold Sédar Senghor in 2006. The bridge owed its architect, Marc Mimram, the Prix de l'Équerre d'Argent the year of its opening.

It is served by the Métro station Assemblée Nationale.

== The first bridges ==
For a century, a cast iron bridge inaugurated by Napoleon III in 1861 allowed vehicles to cross between quai Anatole-France and quai des Tuileries. Built by the engineers of the Pont des Invalides, Paul Gallocher de Lagalisserie and Jules Savarin, it was named after the June 1859 French victory of the Battle of Solferino. Having weakened over time (particularly due to barges crashing into it), it was demolished and replaced in 1961 with a steel footbridge, which was demolished in 1992.

== The present bridge ==
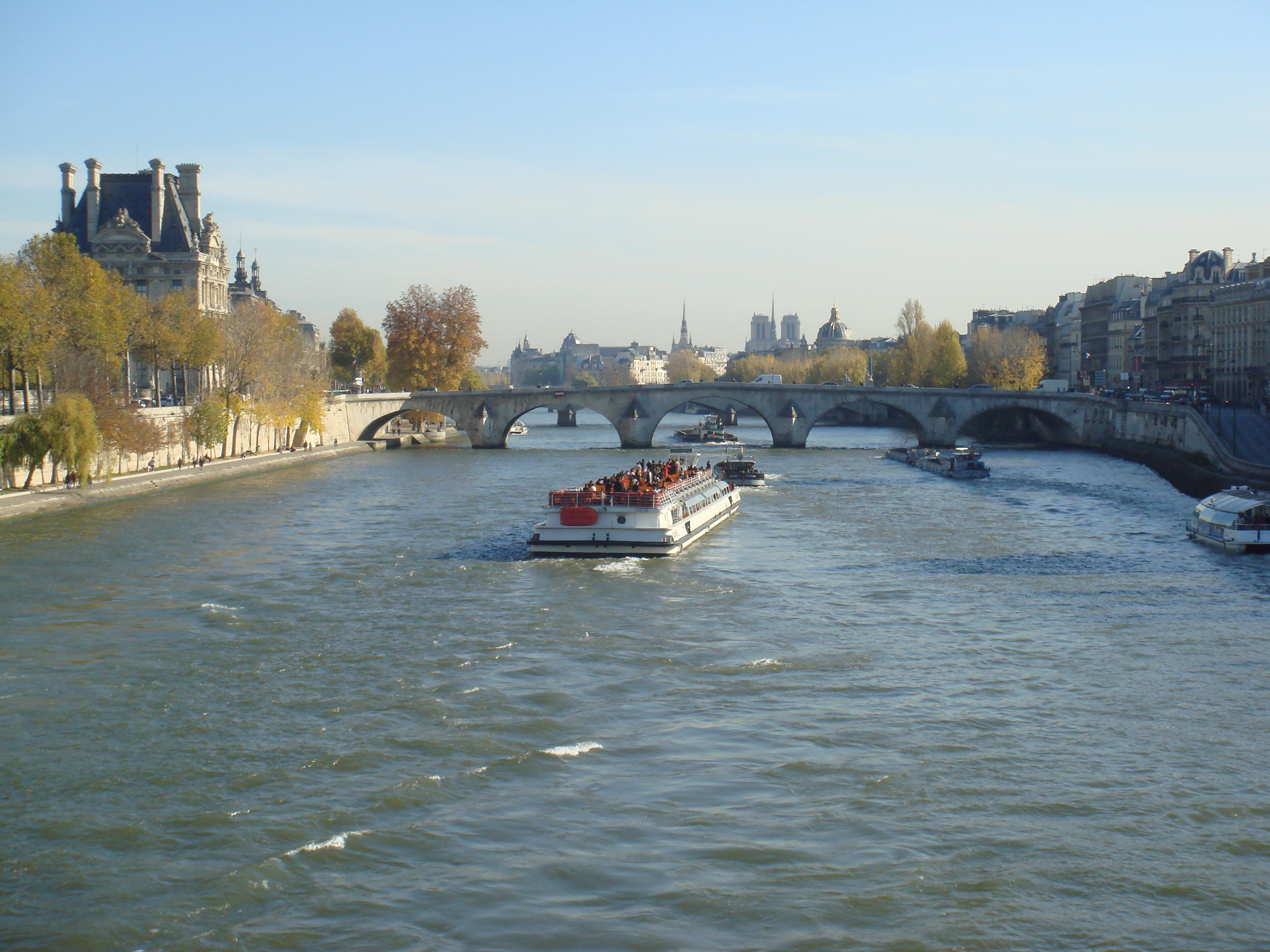
View east from Passerelle Léopold-Sédar-Senghor, towards Pont Royal.

Location on the Seine

The new passerelle de Solférino linking the Musée d'Orsay and the Jardin des Tuileries (Tuileries Gardens) was built between 1997 and 1999 under the direction of the engineer and architect Marc Mimram. Crossing the Seine with a single span and no piers, this metallic bridge is architecturally unique and covered in exotic woods (ipê, a Brazilian tree also used for outdoor flooring at the Bibliothèque nationale de France) which gives it a light and warm appearance. Its solidity is, however, never in doubt - at either end, its foundations are in the form of concrete pillars extending 15m into the ground, and the structure itself is made up of six 150 tonne components built by the Eiffel engineering company, Eiffel Constructions métalliques. Its innovative architecture brought Marc Mimram the award "Prix de l'Équerre d'Argent" for the year 1999.

The bridge also has benches and lampposts for promenaders who can reach the Jardin des Tuileries through a subterranean passage on the Rive Droite.

The bridge was renamed after Léopold Sédar Senghor on 9 October 2006 on the centenary of his birth.
