= Pont du Carrousel =

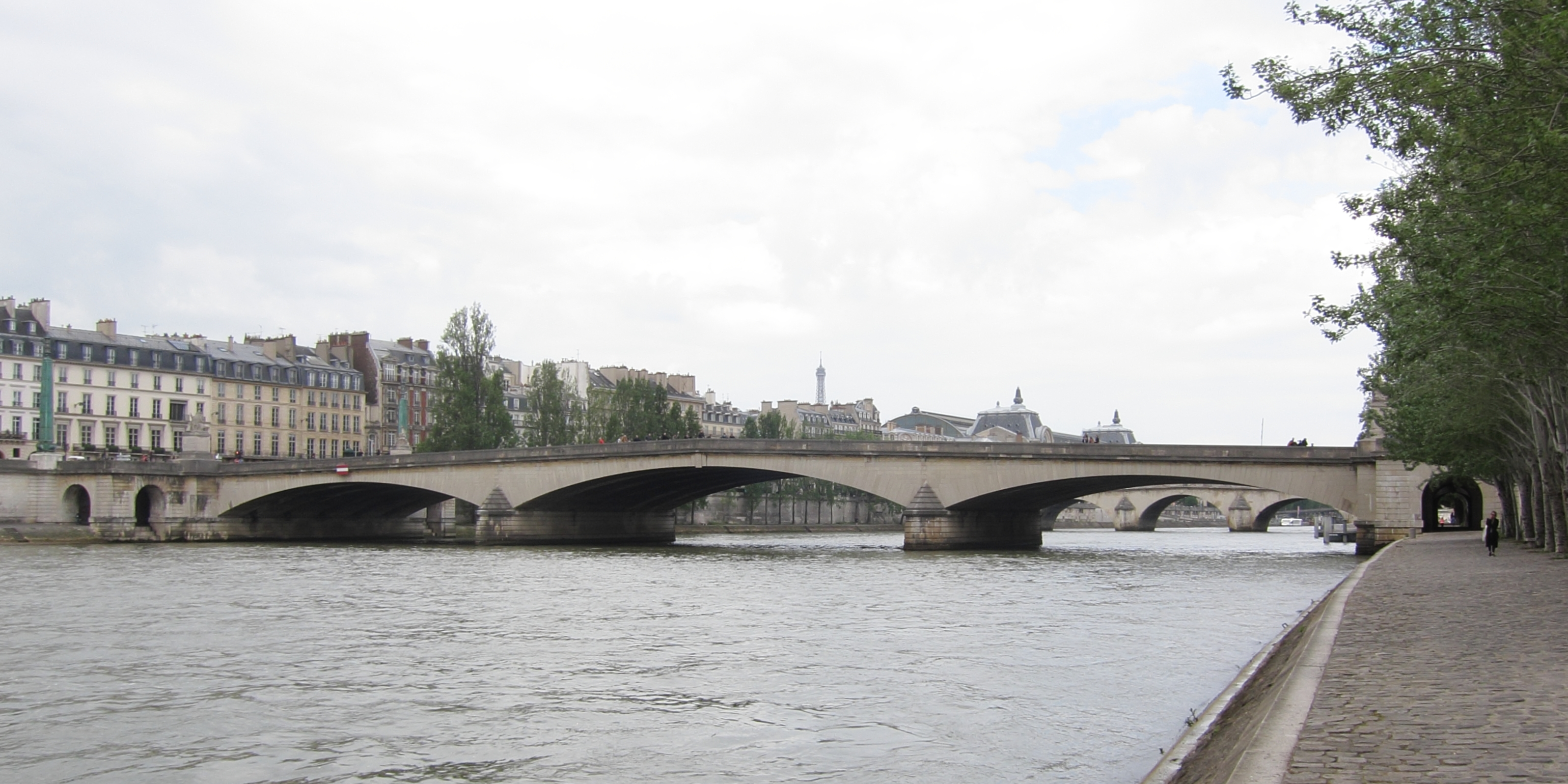
- Coordinates: 48°51′34″N 2°19′59″E
- Crosses: Seine
- Locale: Paris, France
- Next upstream: Pont des Arts
- Next downstream: Pont Royal

Location
- Interactive map of Pont du Carrousel

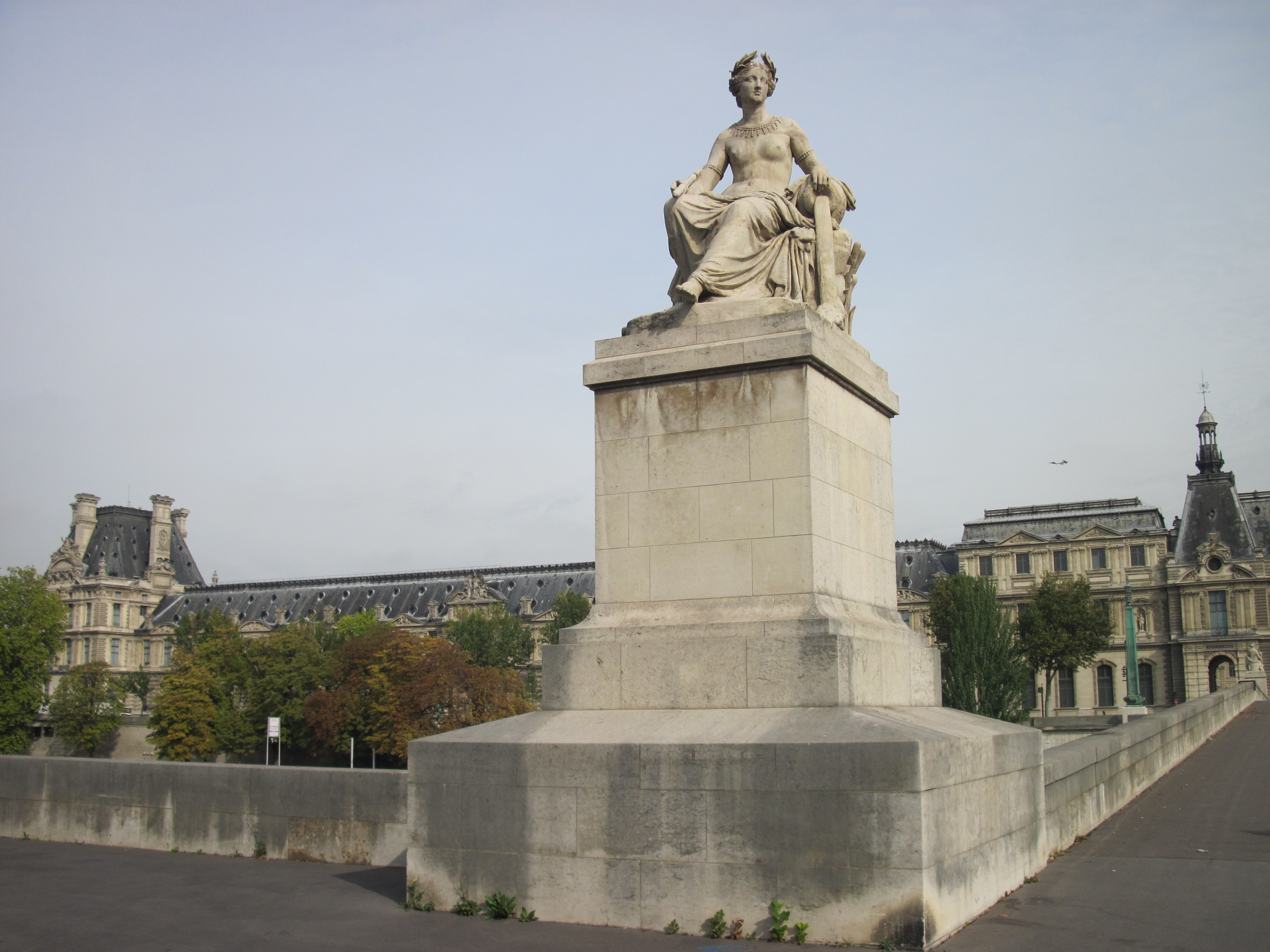
Seine Statue (Louis Petitot) on Pont du Carrousel

The Pont du Carrousel (French pronunciation: [pɔ̃ dy kaʁuzɛl]) is a bridge in Paris, which spans the River Seine between the Quai des Tuileries and the Quai Voltaire.

== History ==
Begun in 1831 in the prolongation of the rue des Saints-Pères on the Left Bank, the original bridge was known under that name until its inauguration, in 1834, when king Louis-Philippe named it Pont du Carrousel, because it opened on the Right Bank river frontage of the Palais du Louvre near the Arc de Triomphe du Carrousel in front of the Tuileries.

The bridge's architect, Antoine-Rémy Polonceau, succeeded in a design that was innovative in several aspects. For one thing, the new structure was an arch bridge, during a period when most bridge construction had turned to suspension bridges; the necessary towers and cables would have been considered unacceptable additions to the Parisian scenery. The structure combined the relatively new material of cast iron with timber. Its graduated cast-iron circular supports were quickly dubbed "napkin rings" (ronds de serviette). At each corner of the bridge were erected classic style stone allegorical sculptures by Louis Petitot, which remain in situ. They represent Industry, Abundance, The City of Paris and The Seine.

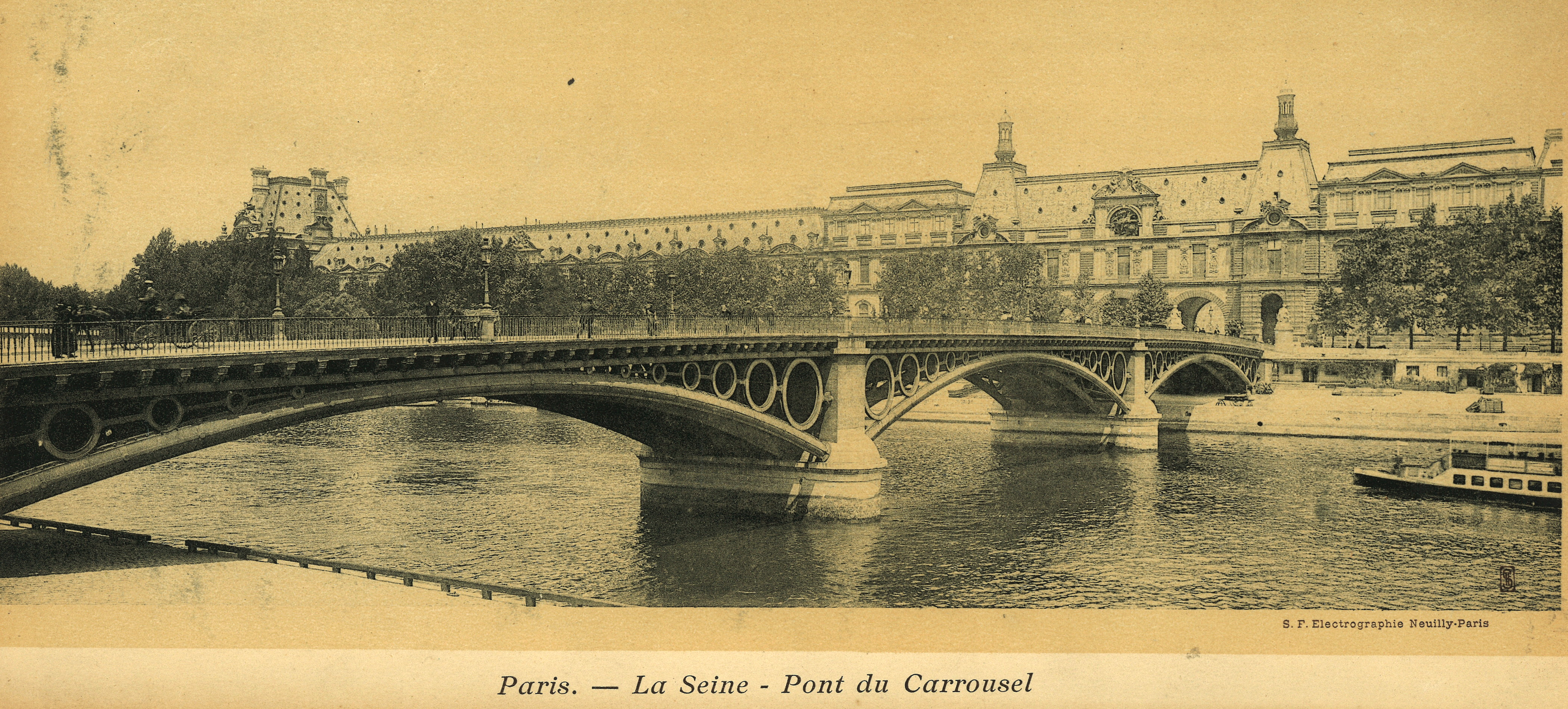
La Seine Pont du Carrousel

In 1906, after seven decades of use, serious restoration was required; the former wooden elements were replaced with beaten iron. Nevertheless, the bridge was too narrow for twentieth-century traffic, and shifted alarmingly. In 1930, its height above the river was judged insufficient for river transportation, and it was decided to scrap it for an entirely new structure to be built a few tens of metres downstream from the former one, and with greater headroom on the river. The architects Malet and Lang attempted to respect the former aspect, which now had become familiar to Parisians. The new bridge of reinforced concrete still crosses the river in three arches reaching the right bank in front of the Louvre, in direct line with the Arc de Triomphe du Carrousel. For its lighting at night, the iron craftsman Raymond Subes conceived an ingenious telescoping system that raised the streetlights from a height of 13 metres in the daytime to 20 metres at nightfall when they were lit; however, the system was too fragile to be of any use and did not function until it was repaired in 1999. The nearest Métro station is Palais Royal - Musée du Louvre.

== Brahim Bouarram Affair ==
On 1 May 1995, the Moroccan immigrant Brahim Bouarram drowned after being pushed into the Seine river near the bridge by members of a Front National procession. In 2003, in the name of all the citizens of Paris, the mayor of the city, Bertrand Delanoë, honored the memory of Bouarram and all the victims of racism with a commemorative plaque on the bridge.
