= Tuileries Palace =

Royal and imperial palace in Paris (1564–1883)

- Palais des Tuileries
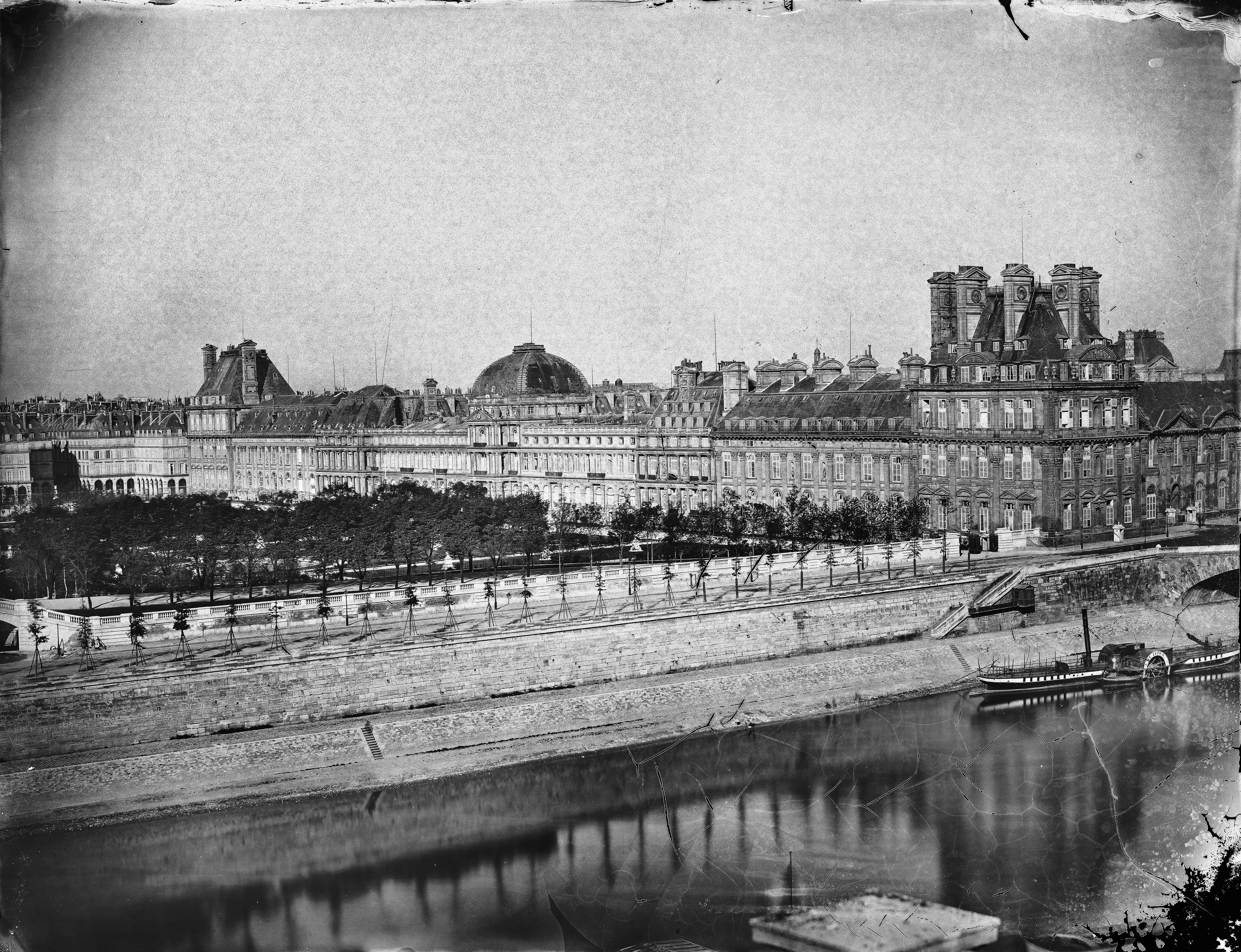
- The Tuileries Palace from the Solférino Bridge, mid 19th century. The Pavillon de Flore is to the right
- Interactive map of the Tuileries Palace area

General information
- Type: Royal and Imperial residence
- Architectural style: Construction work started in the 16th century (Renaissance). Additions of the 17th and 18th centuries (Louis XIII style and Baroque). Additions of the 19th century (Empire style, Neo-Classical, Neo-Baroque and Second Empire style).
- Coordinates: 48°51′44″N 2°19′57″E
- Construction started: 1564
- Completed: 1860s
- Demolished: 30 September 1883

The Tuileries Palace (French: palais des Tuileries, [palɛ de tɥilʁi]) was a palace in Paris which stood on the right bank of the Seine, directly in the west-front of the Louvre Palace. It was the Parisian residence of most French monarchs, from Henri IV to Napoleon III, until it was burned by the Paris Commune in 1871 and demolished in 1883.

Construction began in 1564, originally to serve as a home for Queen Catherine de' Medici, and was gradually extended until it closed off the western end of the courtyard and displayed an immense façade of 266 metres. Since the destruction of the Tuileries, the courtyard has remained open to the west, and the site now overlooks the eastern end of the Tuileries Garden, forming an elevated terrace between the Place du Carrousel and the gardens proper.

== History ==
=== Plan of Catherine de' Medici (16th century) ===
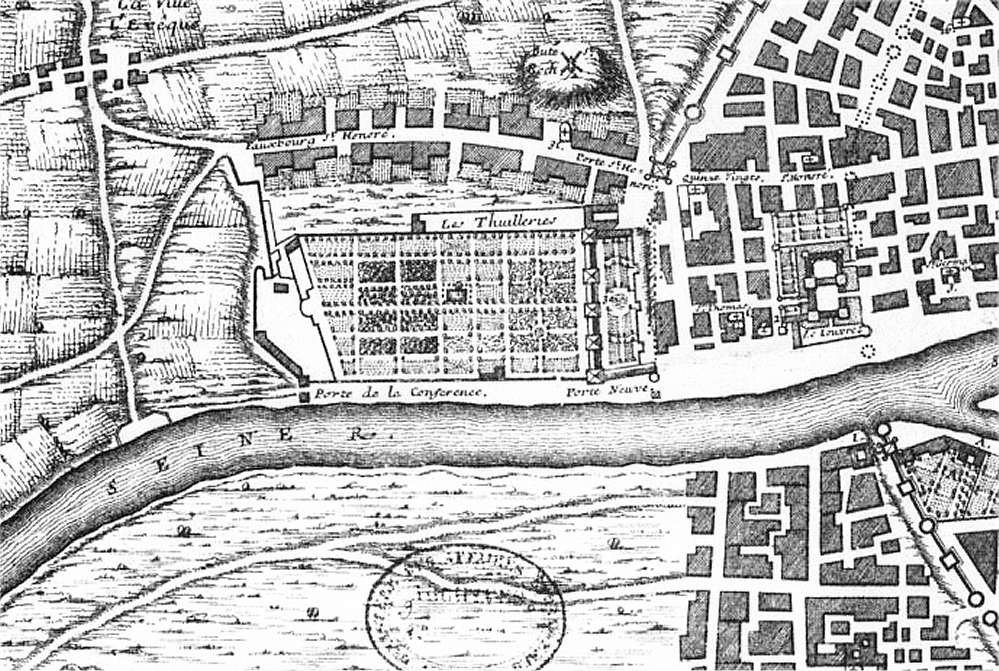
The Tuileries, just outside the city walls, in about 1589

The site of the Tuileries Palace was originally just outside the walls of the city, in an area frequently flooded by the Seine as far as the present Rue Saint-Honoré. The land was occupied by the workshops and kilns craftsmen who made 'tuiles', or roof tiles. Because of its proximity to the Louvre Castle, members of the royal family began buying plots of land there.

After the death of Henri II in 1559, his widow Catherine de' Medici moved into the Louvre Castle with her son, Francis II. She planned a new residence for herself, on a site that was close to the Louvre and had space for a large garden. She sold the medieval Hôtel des Tournelles, near the Bastille, where her husband had died, and between 1563 and 1568 acquired several pieces of land which she put together for her new residence. Construction began in 1564, with Philibert de l'Orme working as chief architect. De l'Orme died in 1570, when the work was still in its early stages. His place was taken by Jean Bullant. The 1588 Day of the Barricades between Catholics and Protestants in the city abruptly halted the work; the unprotected site was abandoned and pillaged.

=== Additions of Henri IV ===
Work did not resume until 1594, when Henri IV made a triumphal return to Paris and recommenced construction of the Louvre and the Tuileries. He constructed the Grande Galerie, parallel to the Seine, which connected the two palaces. At the same time, Henri commissioned the landscape gardener Claude Mollet to modify the plan of the gardens. The architects and decorators Étienne Dupérac, Louis Métezeau, and Jacques II Androuet du Cerceau contributed to the new palace. Androuet du Cerceau contributed the Pavillon des Tuileries (later renamed Pavillon de Flore), which links the Tuileries Palace to the Grande Galerie.

The Tuileries Palace after the additions made under Henri IV

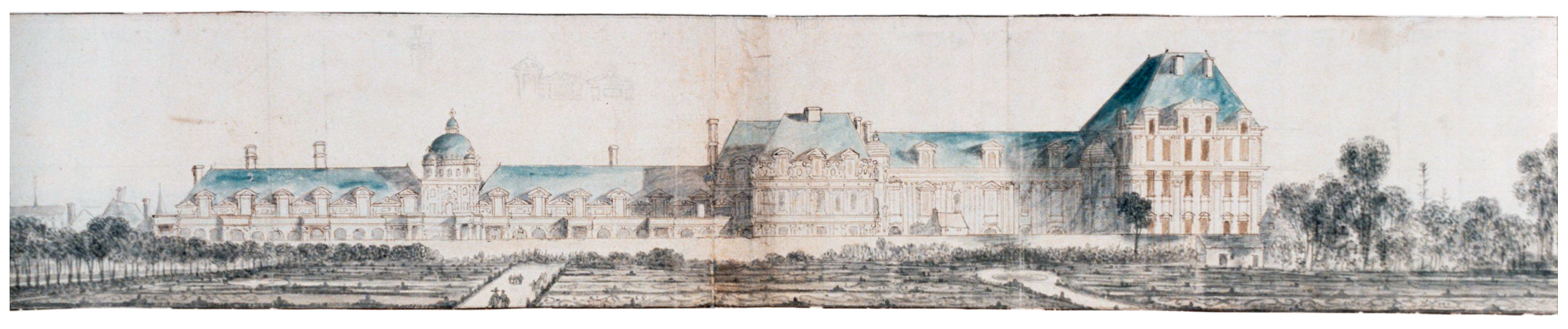
Anonymous watercolour (c. 1650, BnF), showing (from left to right) Philibert de l'Orme's two symmetric wings flanking the staircase pavilion with a dome likely added by Henri IV; the Bullant Pavilion; and the Petite Galerie des Tuileries and Pavillon de Flore, both constructed under Henri IV

=== Louis XIV and Louis XV – enlargement and departure (17th and 18th centuries) ===
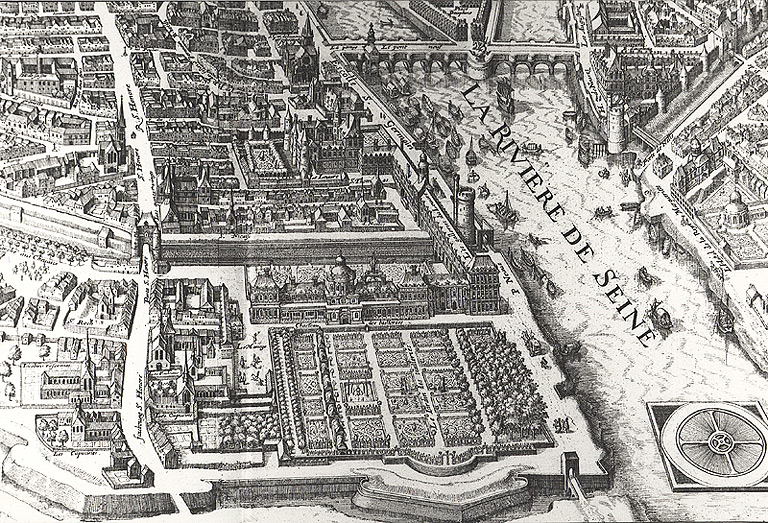
The Tuileries Palace (in foreground) and its garden, in plan engraved by Matthäus Merian the Elder in 1615

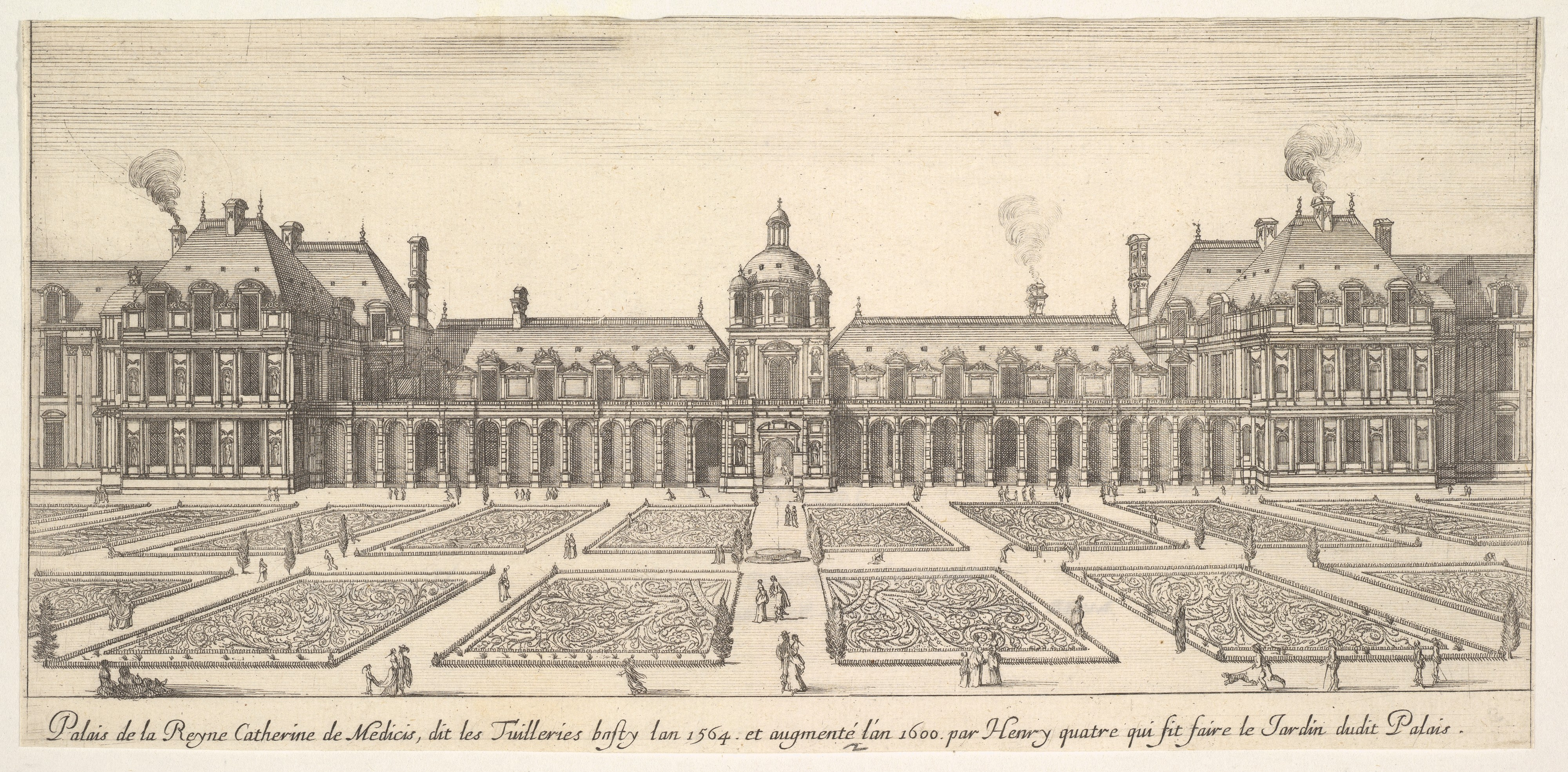
The Tuileries Palace in the 17th century

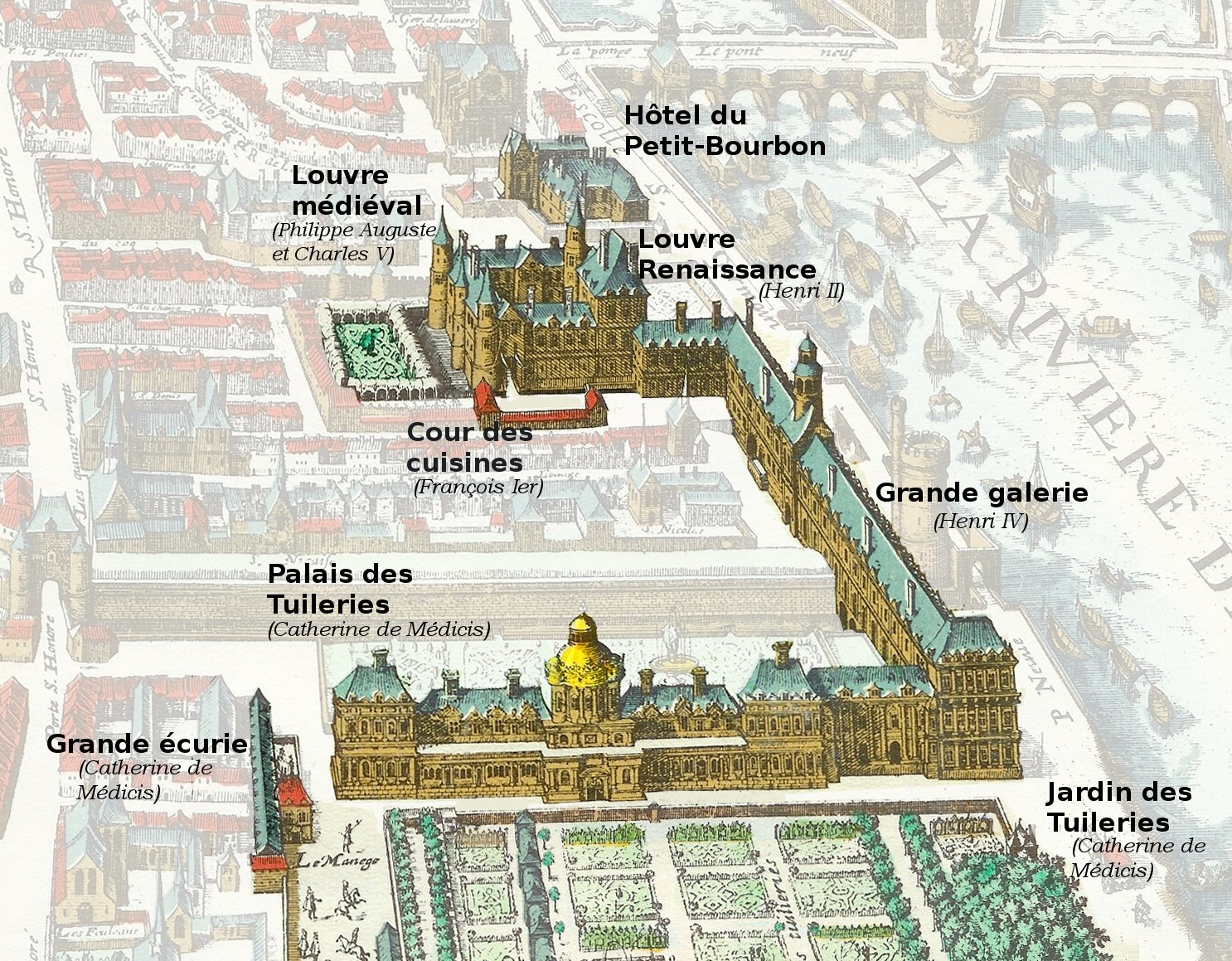
The old Louvre castle (background) and the Tuileries (foreground) linked by the Grande Galerie along the Seine, in 1615

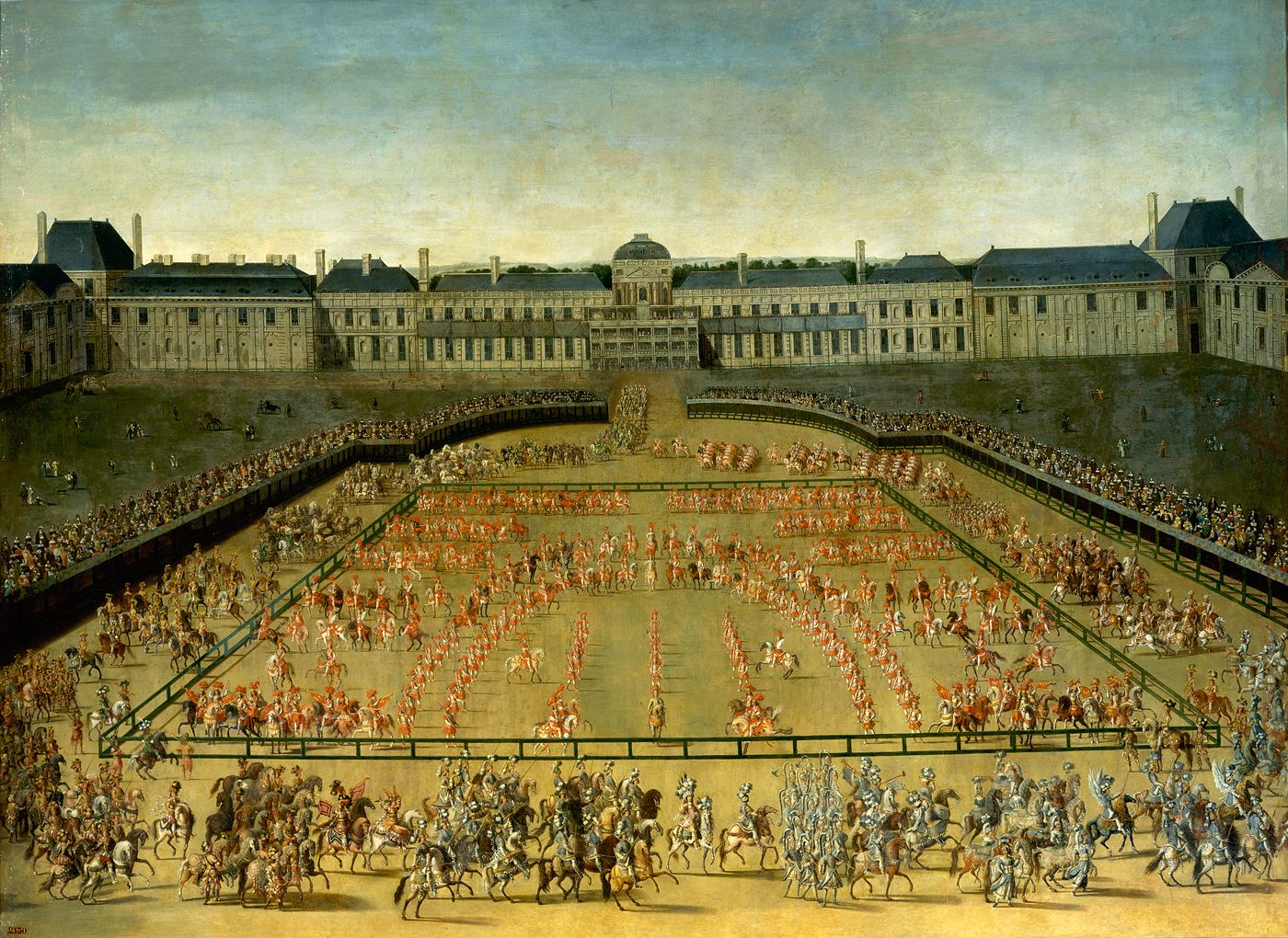
Grand Carrousel of 1662 at the Tuileries under Louis XIV to celebrate the birth of his son Louis, Dauphin of France

After the death of Henri IV in 1610, work on the palace halted. His son Louis XIII had no intention of continuing construction. Work did not resume until after the end of the Fronde in 1653. Between 1659 and 1661, Louis XIV and Cardinal Mazarin had Louis Le Vau enlarge the palace, extending it to the north with the addition of the Théâtre des Tuileries.

In 1662, Louis XIV celebrated the birth of his son and heir, Louis, Dauphin of France, with a spectacular 'Carrousel' held in the courtyard on the east side of the palace. The equestrian pageant, with dressage and other exercises, drew over 700 participants. It offered a variety of tournaments and competitions, including a contest in which horsemen were asked to spear the cardboard heads of 'Saracens' and 'Moors', as well as a series of mounted processions around the courtyard, complete with music. The King himself took part, dressed as a Roman emperor. The courtyard thereafter became known as the Carrousel.

From 1664 to 1666, Le Vau and his assistant François d'Orbay made other significant changes. They transformed Philibert de l'Orme's façades and central pavilion, replacing its grand central staircase with a colonnaded vestibule on the ground floor and the Salle des Cents Suisses (Hall of the Hundred Swiss Guards) on the floor above. They also added a rectangular dome. A new grand staircase was installed in the entrance of the north wing of the palace, and lavishly decorated royal apartments were installed in the south wing. The King's rooms were on the ground floor, facing the Louvre, and the Queen's on the floor above, overlooking the garden. At the same time, Louis' gardener, André Le Nôtre, redesigned the Tuileries Garden.

Louis XIV fully used his redecorated and enlarged palace for only a short time. The court moved into the Tuileries Palace in November 1667 but left in 1672, and soon thereafter settled in the Palace of Versailles. The Tuileries Palace was virtually abandoned and used only as a theatre, but its gardens became a fashionable resort for Parisians.

Following the death of Louis XIV in September 1715, his great-grandson, Louis XV, just five years old, was moved from Versailles to the Tuileries Palace on 1 January 1716. The palace had been rarely used in forty years; it was refurnished and redecorated for the new King, but he remained only until 15 June 1722, when he returned to Versailles, three months before his coronation. Both moves were made at the behest of the regent, Philippe II, Duke of Orléans. The King also resided at the Tuileries for short periods in the 1740s. The large palace theatre continued to be used as a venue for operas, concerts and performances of the Comédie-Française.

=== Louis XVI – Royal sanctuary and revolutionary battleground ===
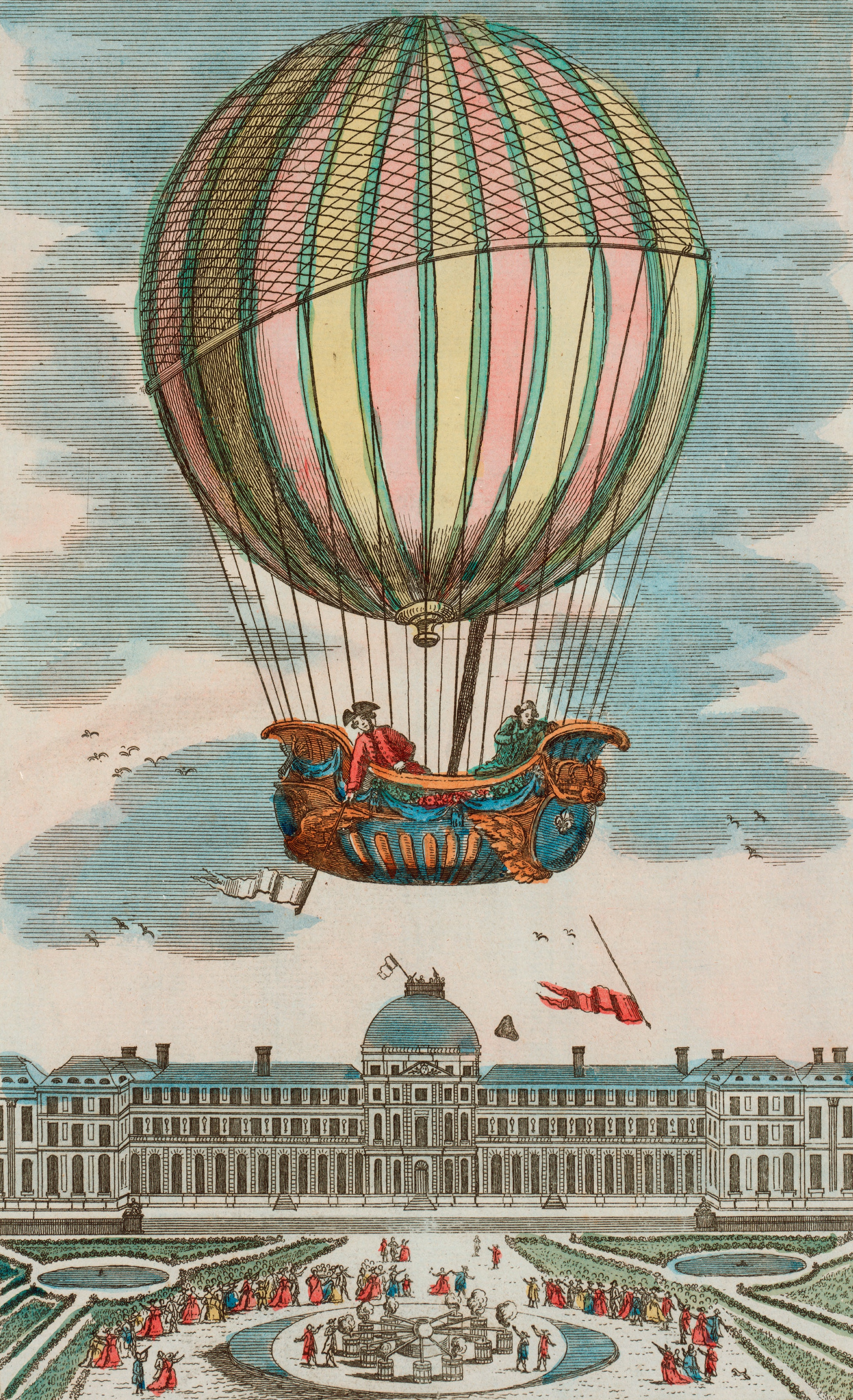
Manned balloon flight of Jacques Charles taking off at Tuileries Palace, 1 December 1783

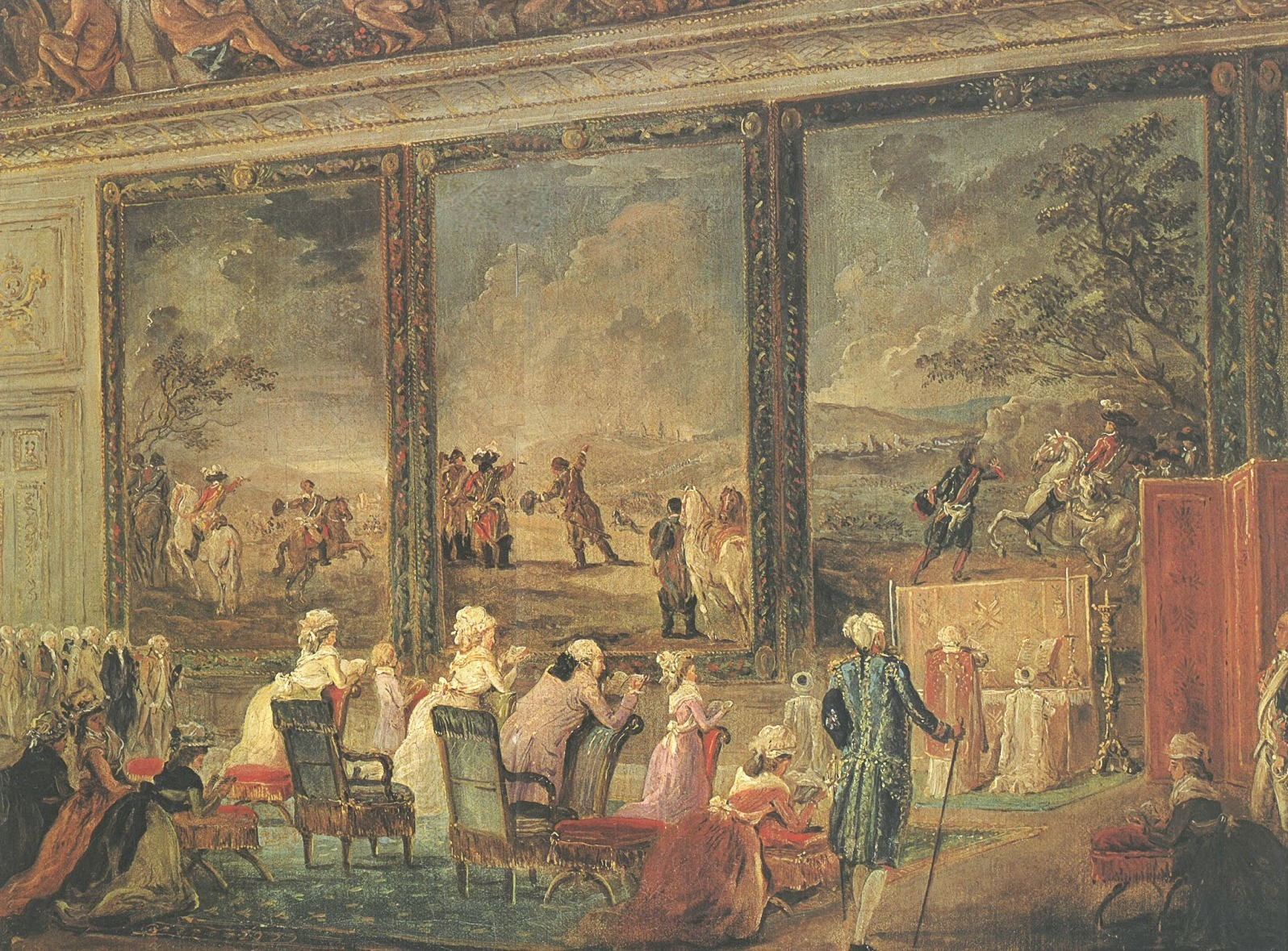
Louis XVI and family celebrate Mass at the Tuileries Palace

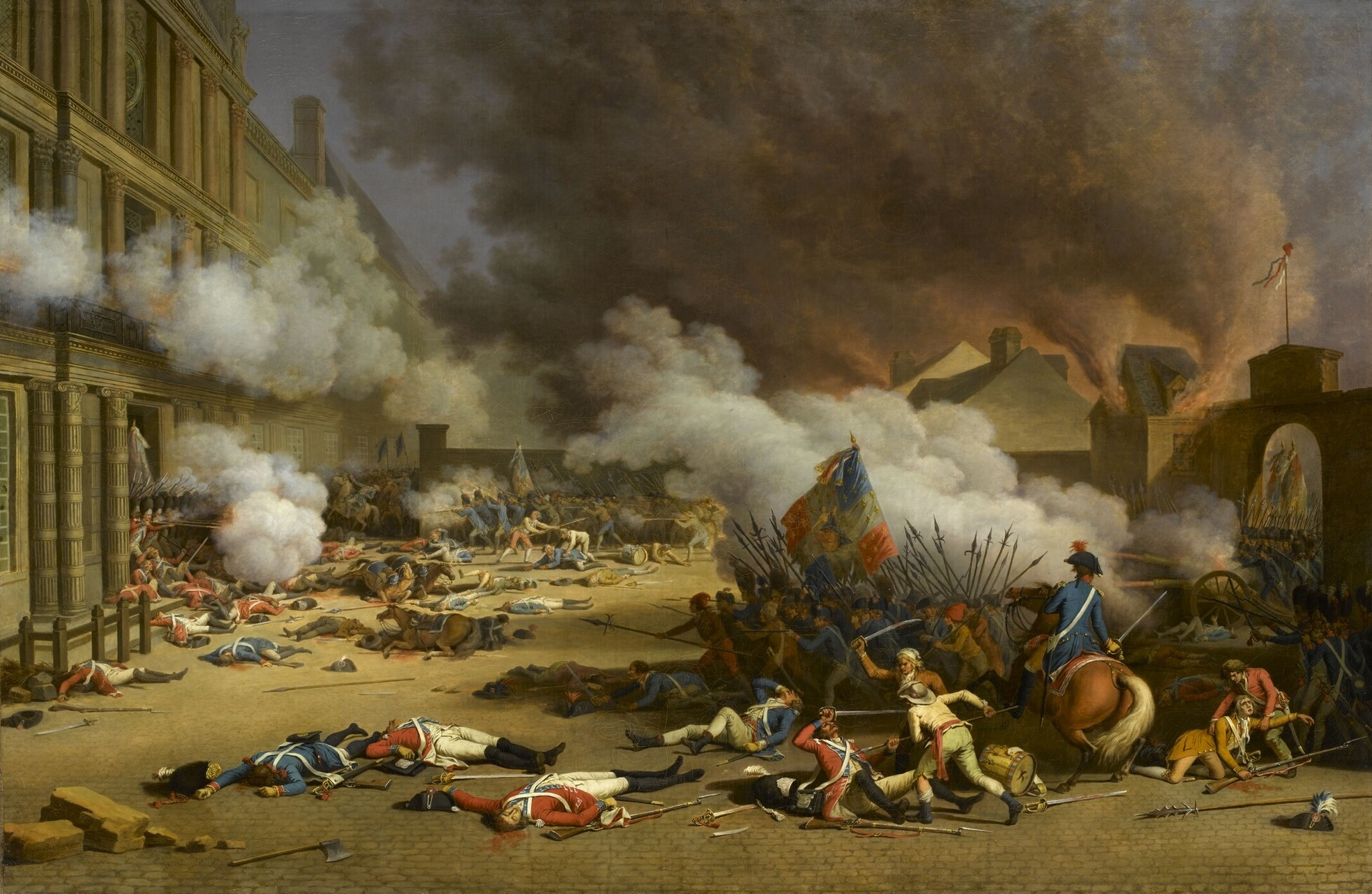
Storming of the Tuileries Palace on 10 August 1792 and the massacre of the Swiss Guard

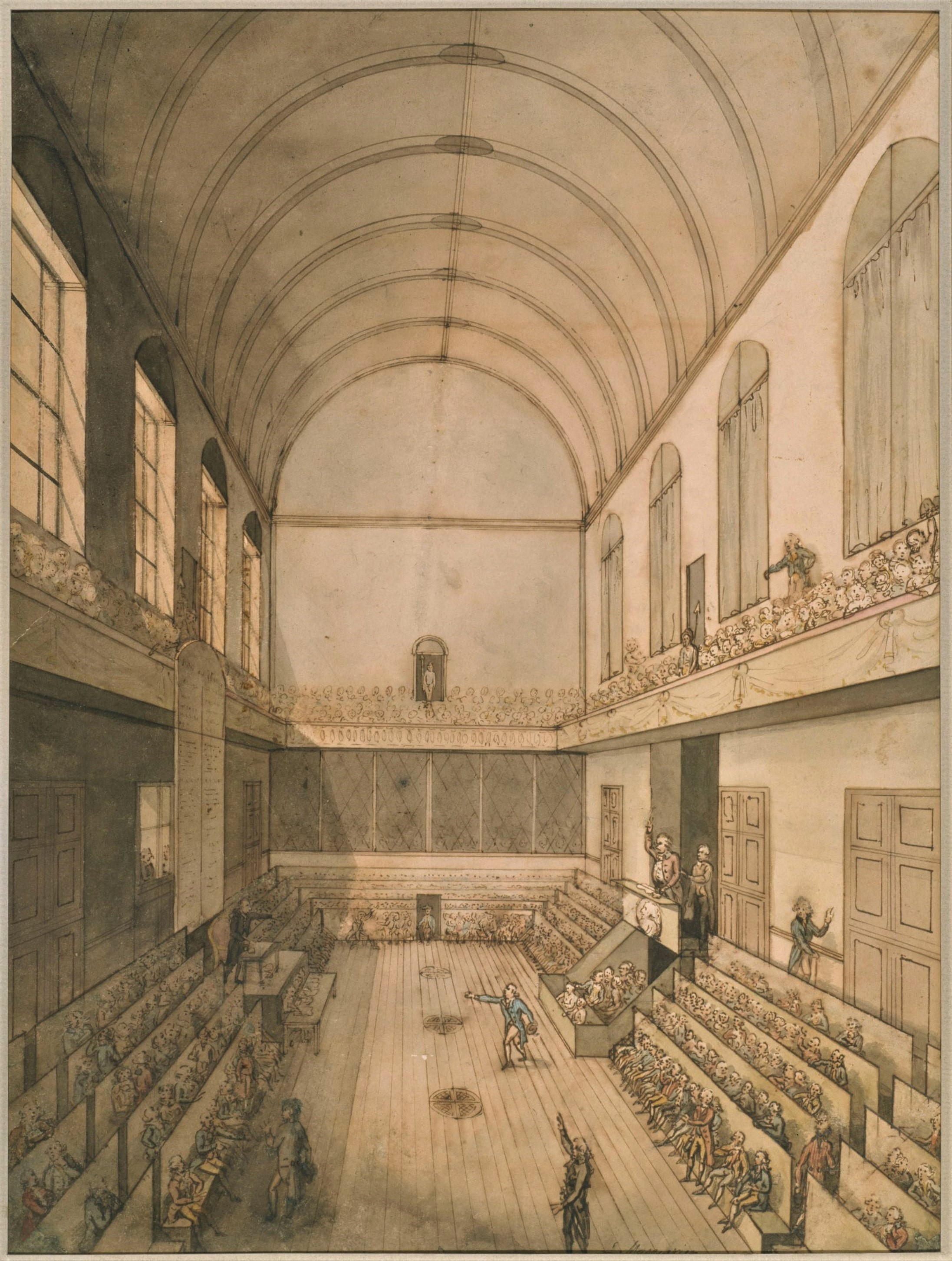
Meeting of the National Convention in the Salle du Manège in August 1792

On 1 December 1783, the palace garden was the starting point of a major event in aviation history—the first manned flight in a hydrogen balloon, by Jacques Charles and the Robert brothers. It took place just two months after the first manned balloon flight by the Montgolfier brothers in a hot air balloon from the Palace of Versailles. King Louis XVI watched from the tower. Among the crowd of spectators was Benjamin Franklin, the United States ambassador to France. The balloon and its passengers landed safely at Nesles-la-Vallée, around 50 kilometres from Paris.

On 6 October 1789, Louis XVI and his family were forced to leave Versailles for Paris, moving into the Tuileries. Nothing had been prepared for their arrival; the various occupants who had moved into the palace were abruptly expelled, and furniture had to be brought from Versailles. The royal family lived in relative calm for a time; the gardens were reserved for them until noon when they were opened to the public.

On 9 November 1789 the National Constituent Assembly moved its meetings from Versailles to the Salle du Manège. This was the Tuileries' covered equestrian academy, on the north side of the palace, which was the largest meeting hall in the city. It was also used by the Assembly's successor, the National Convention and, in 1795, the Council of Five Hundred (Conseil des Cinq-Cents) of the Directory until the body moved to the Palais Bourbon in 1798. In 1799, the Jacobin Club du Manège had its headquarters there. The Committee of Public Safety, led by Robespierre, met in the Pavillon de Flore.

On 21 June 1791, as the Revolution intensified and their safety became increasingly compromised, the King and his family attempted to leave Paris. That night they attended a final Vespers Mass in the palace chapel, and then, disguised and with their attendants, attempted to reach Montmédy by coach. They were stopped and arrested in Varennes, brought back to Paris, and placed under house arrest.

On 10 August 1792 a large mob stormed the gates, entered the gardens, and overwhelmed and massacred the Swiss Guards who were defending the palace. They set fires in several of the outlying buildings of the palace. Vestiges of buildings destroyed by the fires were discovered during archaeological excavations in 1989. After the massacre of the Swiss Guards, the palace itself was taken over by the sans-culottes. In November 1792, the invaders discovered the armoire de fer, a safe in the royal apartments, believed to contain the secret correspondence of Louis XVI with other European powers, appealing for help. This increased anger against the imprisoned royal family. The National Convention, first meeting in the Salle du Manège and from 10 May 1793 in the remodelled Salle des Machines in the palace, launched the Reign of Terror in 1793–94, leading to the execution of the King, his wife Marie Antoinette, his sister Madame Élisabeth, and thousands of others accused of opposing the Revolution.

=== Napoleon Bonaparte ===
Napoleon in his study at the Tuileries

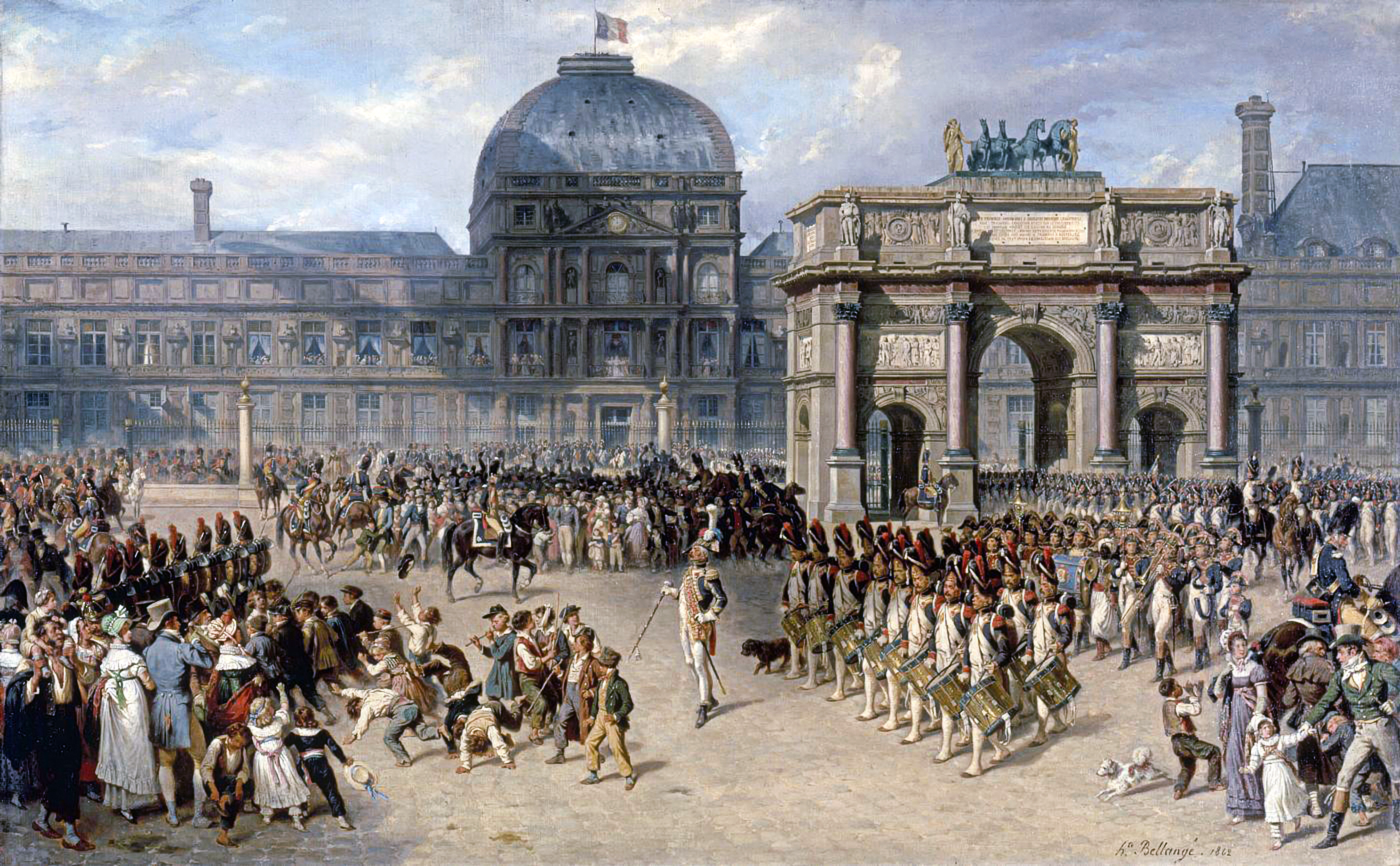
Military review in front of Napoleon's new triumphal arch in the courtyard by Hippolyte Bellangé, 1810

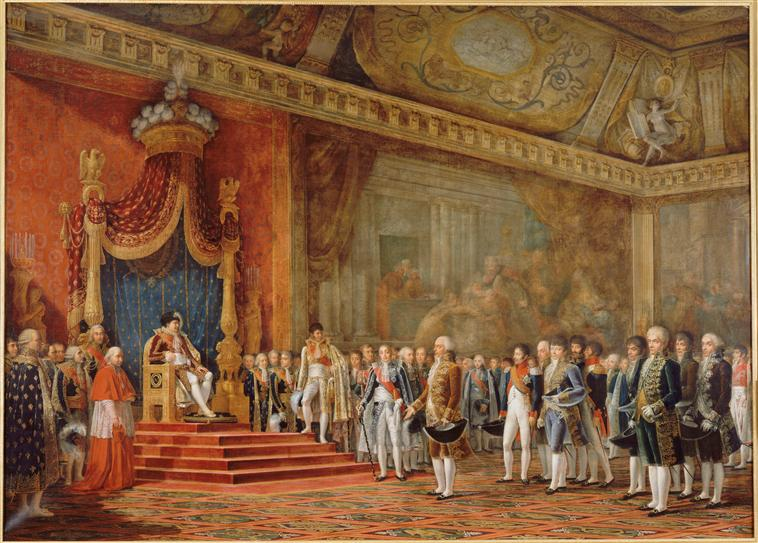
Napoleon on his throne at the Tuileries Palace, 1810

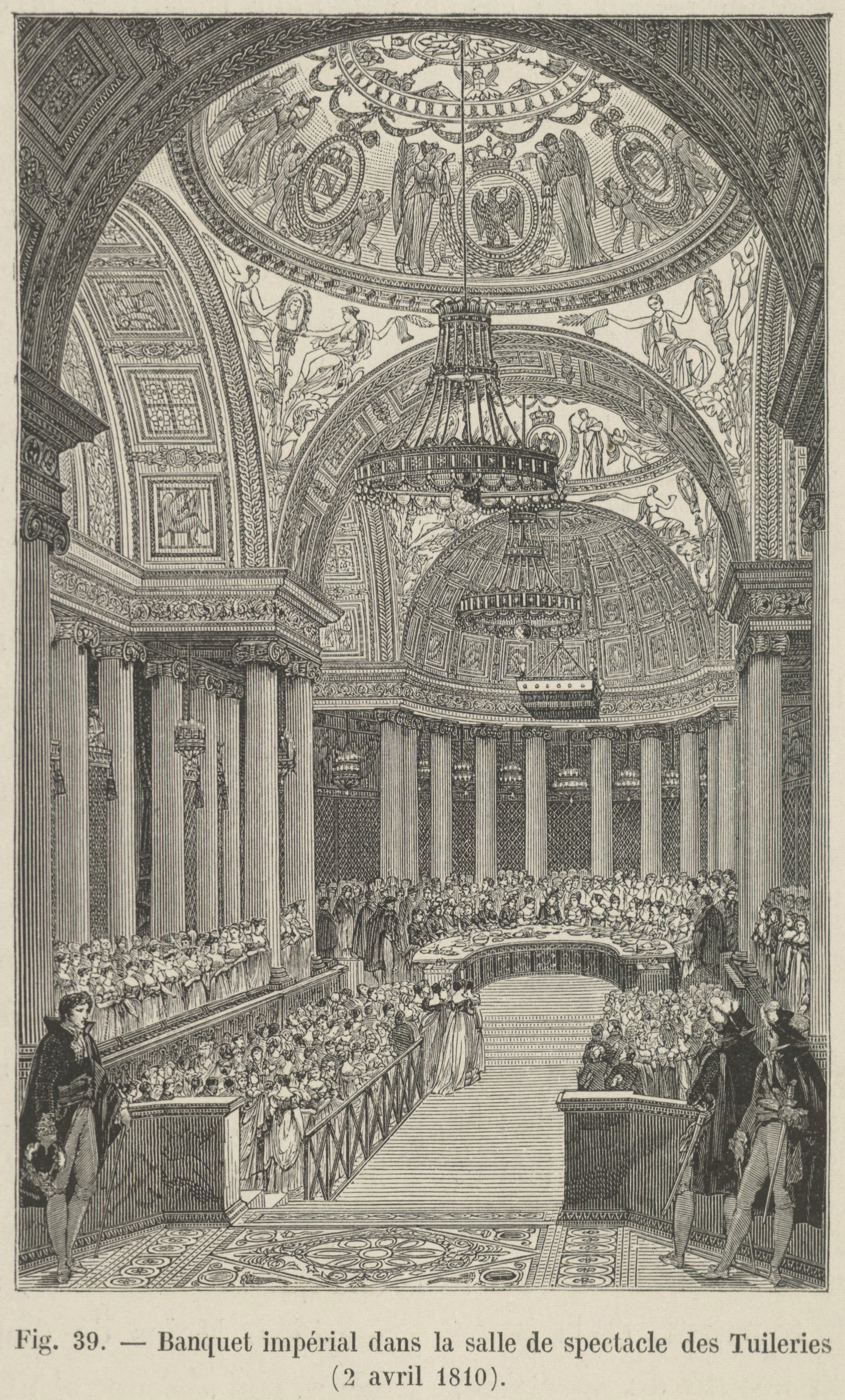
A banquet in the Salle de Spectacle of the Tuileries, 1810

On 19 February 1799, Napoleon Bonaparte moved his residence from the Petit Luxembourg to the Tuileries, a more suitable setting for his imperial ambitions. Charles Percier and Pierre Fontaine began redesigning the interior in the Neoclassical Empire style. Napoleon also began a series of reconstructions around the palace, tearing down the ruins of buildings burned during the Revolution. In 1806, in the centre of the courtyard of the Carrousel, he ordered the construction of a triumphal arch modelled after the ancient Arch of Septimius Severus in Rome to serve as the ceremonial gateway of the palace. In 1808, after he proclaimed himself emperor, he moved forward with the grand project of Henri IV. This project entailed the construction of a new wing of the palace on the north side of the gardens, which would match the existing wing on the south side. This wing would connect the Tuileries with the Louvre. This involved tearing down the Manège and other buildings to clear the courtyard, and the construction of a new street, the Rue de Rivoli, was carried out. The Hall of the National Convention in the former Salle des Machines was remodelled as a theatre which could easily be reconfigured as a large banquet hall.

After Napoleon's divorce, Pierre-Paul Prud'hon was commissioned to design the apartments of his new wife, Marie Louise. Her bridal suite was decorated with furniture and interior decorations in the Greek Revival style. The son of Napoleon and Marie Louise was born in 1811. He was given a residence in the Waterside Gallery of the Louvre, connected to the Tuileries by a short underground passageway, and his own small pavilion in the courtyard, decorated by Fontaine.

=== Palace of the Bourbon Restoration, Louis Philippe d'Orléans, and Louis-Napoléon Bonaparte ===
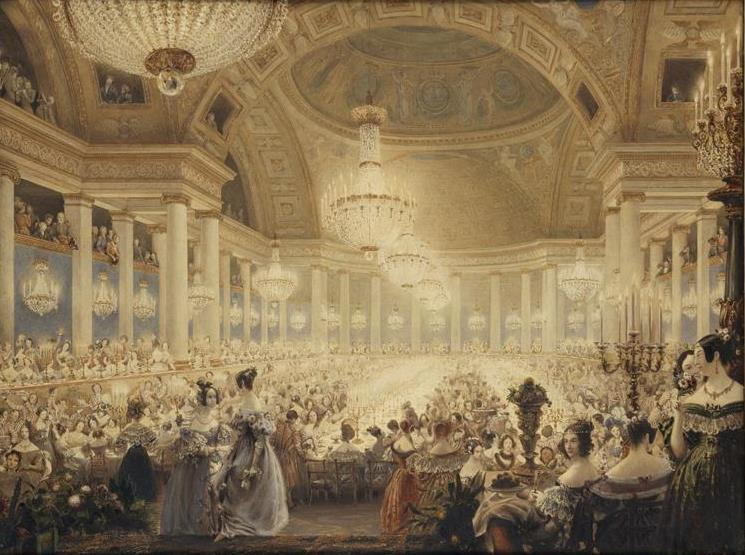
Banquet for women given by Louis Philippe, 1835

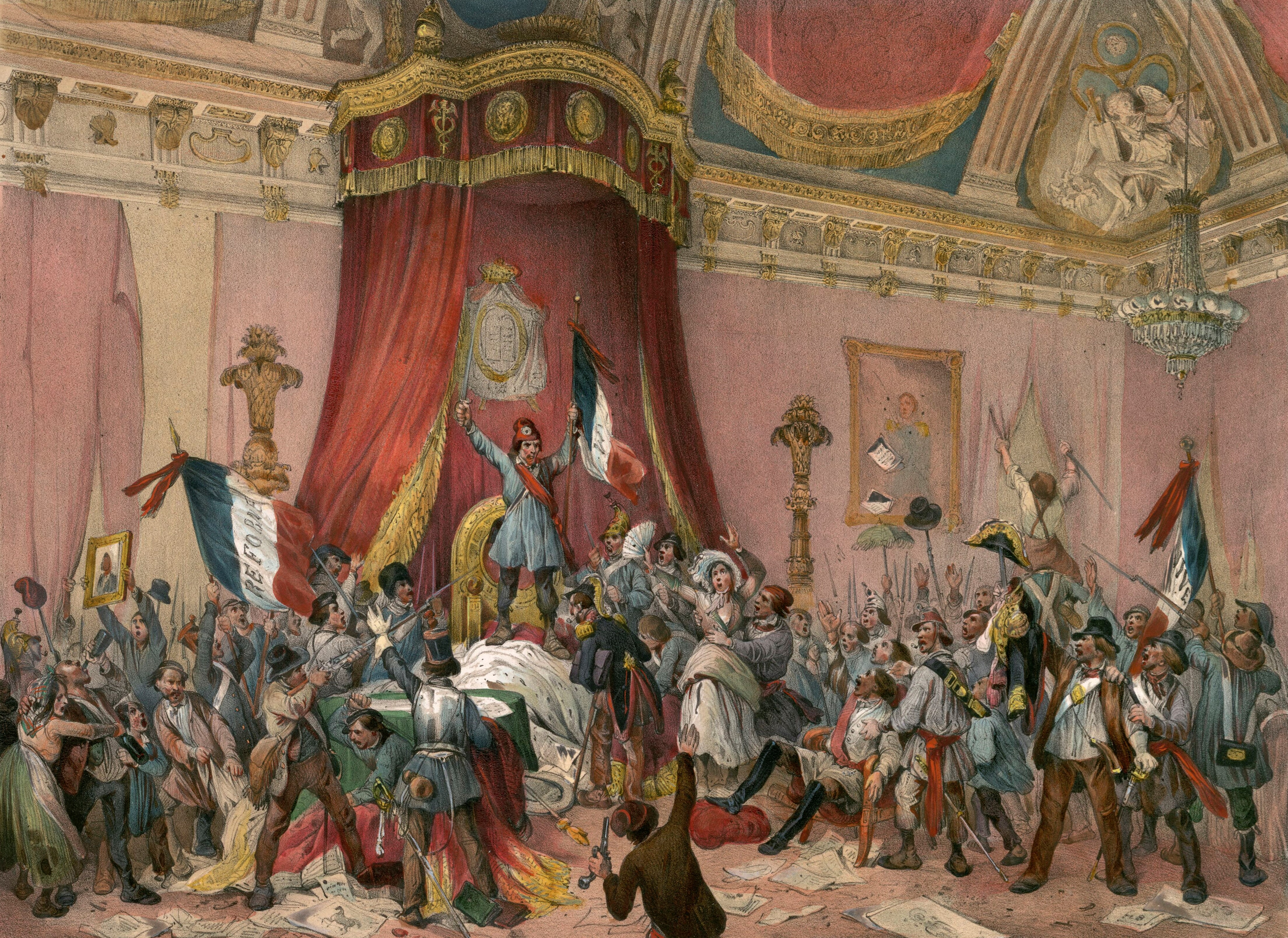
The throne room seized by a mob in the French Revolution of 1848

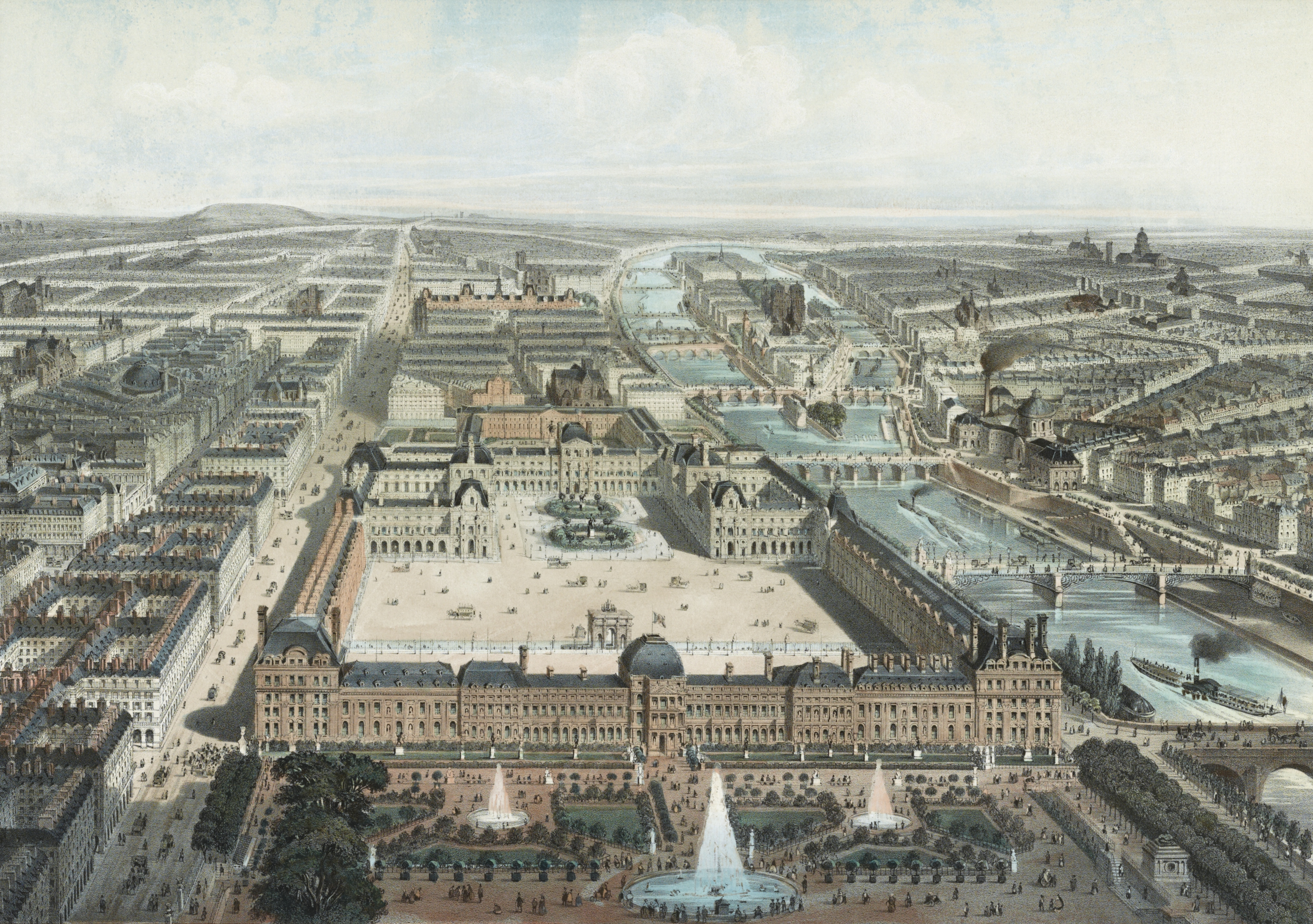
The Tuileries (foreground) and Louvre (centre) in 1860

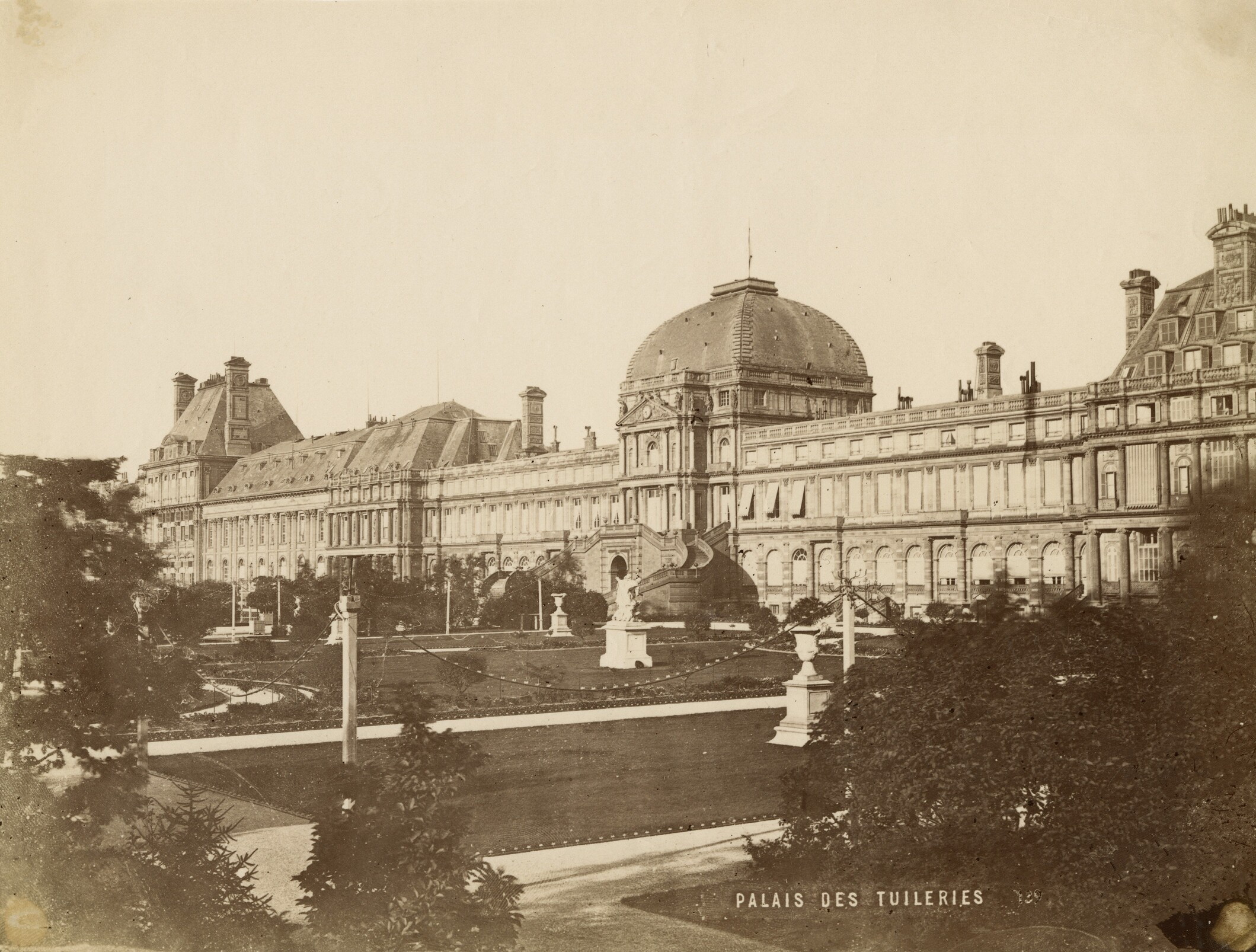
Garden façade

Following the defeat and exile of Napoleon, the gardens became a large camp for Russian and Prussian soldiers, while the House of Bourbon returned to the palace during the Bourbon Restoration. During the July Revolution of 1830, which installed Louis Philippe d'Orléans as the new monarch, the Tuileries was again stormed and occupied by an armed mob. Louis Philippe used the palace until 1848, when he was overthrown by the French Revolution of 1848.

Louis-Napoléon Bonaparte, the nephew of Napoleon, was elected as the first President of France in 1848 and first moved into the Élysée Palace. In 1852, when he could not run again, he proclaimed himself emperor and moved his residence to the Tuileries. The Tuileries was extensively refurbished and redecorated after the looting and damage that had occurred during the Revolution of 1848. Imposing staterooms were designed and richly decorated in what became known as the Second Empire style. The prominent roof lines of the palace, and especially its square central dome, became influential prototypes; they were adopted for hotels and commercial buildings, as well as government buildings and residences both in France and abroad. The new staterooms were theatrical settings for the ceremonies and pageantry of the Second Empire, such as the visit of Queen Victoria in 1855. The old buildings that had filled the courtyard were cleared away; and the northern wing of the Louvre along the Rue de Rivoli, linking the Tuileries Palace with the Louvre, was completed.

The private apartment used by Louis-Napoléon, on the ground floor of the palace's southern wing, consisted of 'gilt boxes furnished in the style of the First Empire.' His rooms were known to be kept at extremely high temperatures, per his request and were filled with smoke, as he smoked cigarette after cigarette. Napoleon III's bedroom was decorated with a talisman from Charlemagne (a symbol of good luck for the Bonaparte family), while his office featured a portrait of Julius Caesar by Ingres and a large map of Paris that he used to show his ideas for the reconstruction of Paris to his prefect of the Seine department, Baron Georges-Eugène Haussmann. His wife, Eugénie de Montijo, had her apartment, comprising 8 of the 11 rooms on the piano nobile of the southern wing's garden side, above, connected to her husband's by a winding staircase, highly decorated in Louis XVI style with a pink salon, a green salon and a blue salon. Along this staircase was a mezzanine occupied by the treasurer of the privy purse.

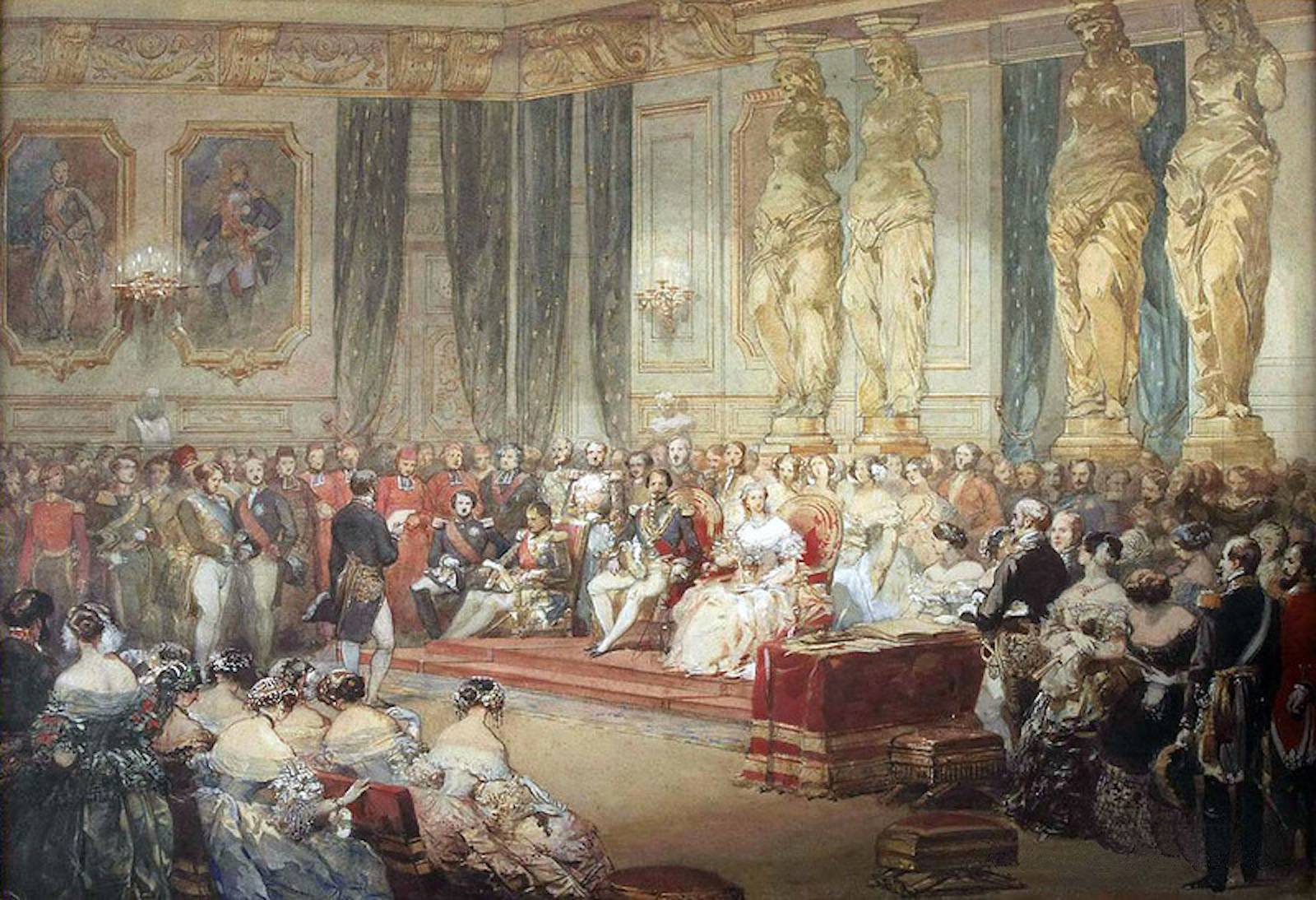
Reception in the Hall of the Marshals

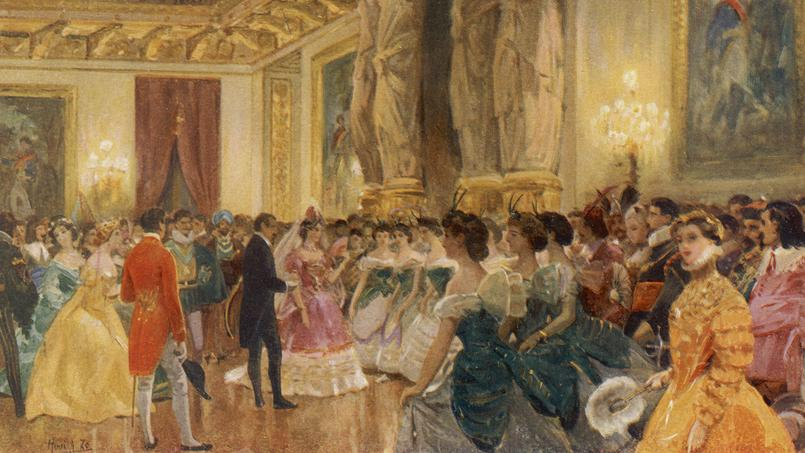
A masked ball in the Hall of the Marshals

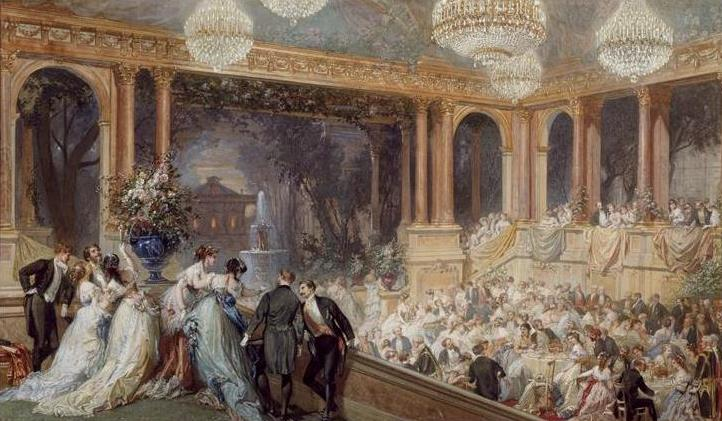
Banquet, 1867

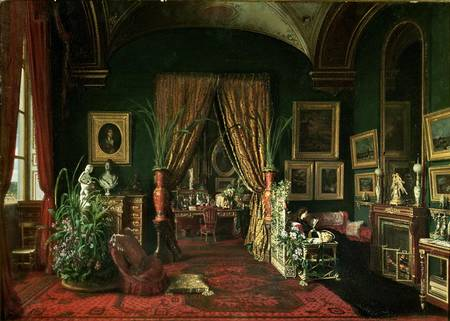
Salon of Eugénie de Montijo

The state rooms of the south wing—located on the side facing east to the Carrousel—were used variously, depending on the occasion. At informal dinners, the household would gather in the private drawing room, or Salon d'Apollon, which was separated from the Salle des Maréchaux, in the central pavilion, by the First Consul's Room, or Salon Blanc. The party would proceed through the throne room to dinner in the Salon Louis XIV. However, gala dinners were held in the larger Galerie de Diane, the southernmost of the state apartments. If it were a state ball, then refreshments would be set up in the Galerie; and the procession of the party would be from there to the Salle de Maréchaux, which occupied the space of two entire floors of the central Pavillon de l'Horloge and served as the ballroom.

The little-used northern wing of the palace, which contained the chapel, the Galerie de la Paix, and the Salle de Spectacle, was used only for performances, such as the Daniel Auber cantata performed on the evening of Louis-Napoléon and Eugénie's civil wedding ceremony, 29 July 1853, or for important fêtes, such as the party given for sovereigns attending the International Exposition on 10 June 1867. The Salle de Spectacle was also used as a hospital during the Franco-Prussian War.

Between 1864 and 1868, Napoleon III asked that the Pavillon de Flore, now the southernmost pavilion, be redesigned by Hector Lefuel to match his other modifications to the palaces. It served as the backstairs to the palace, served by a network of service corridors. From the Pavillon de Flore, one could access the sprawling basement, lit with innumerable gas lamps, where a railway had been set up to bring food from the kitchens under the Rue de Rivoli.

=== Destruction during the Paris Commune ===
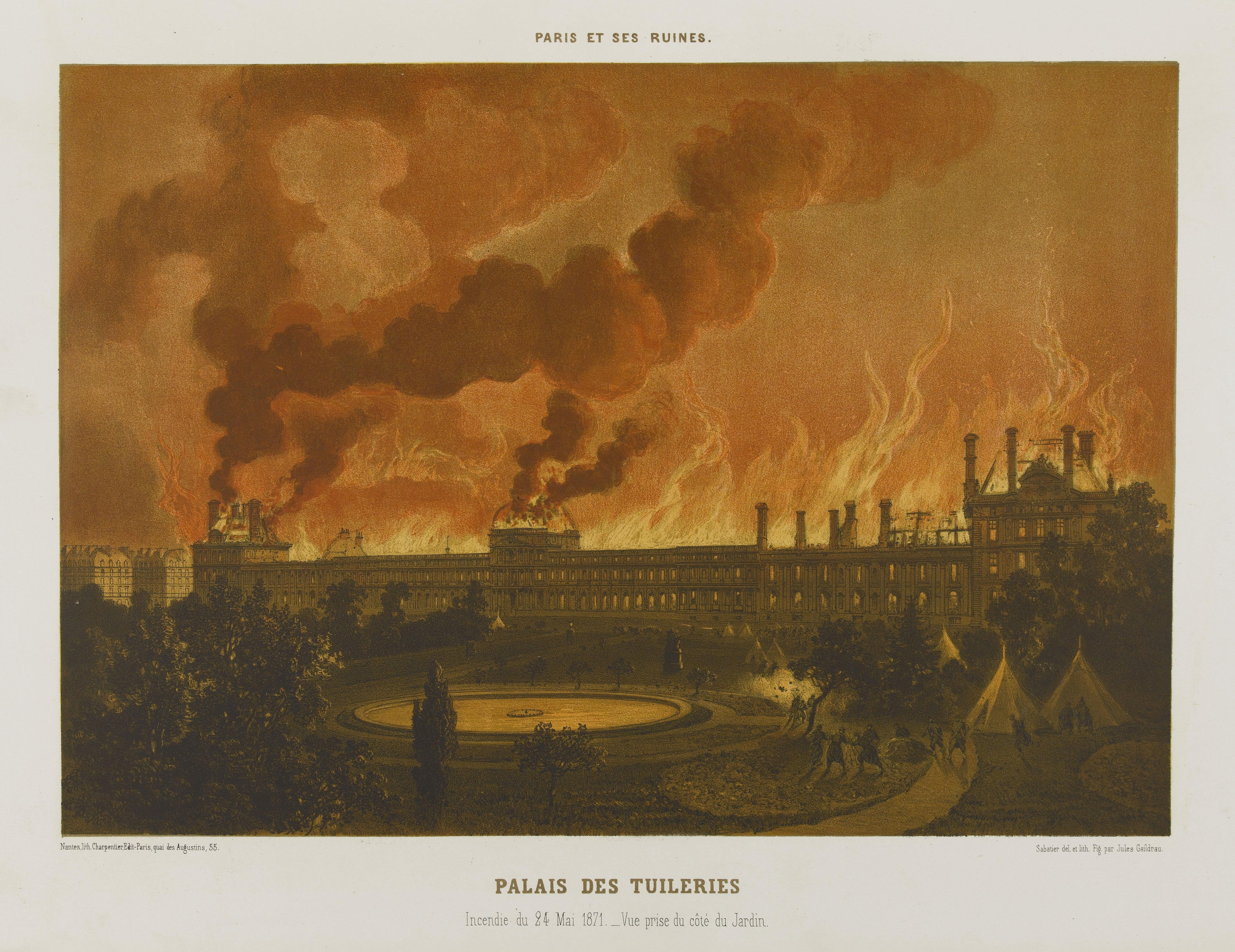
Burning of the Palace by Paris Commune, 23–24 May 1871

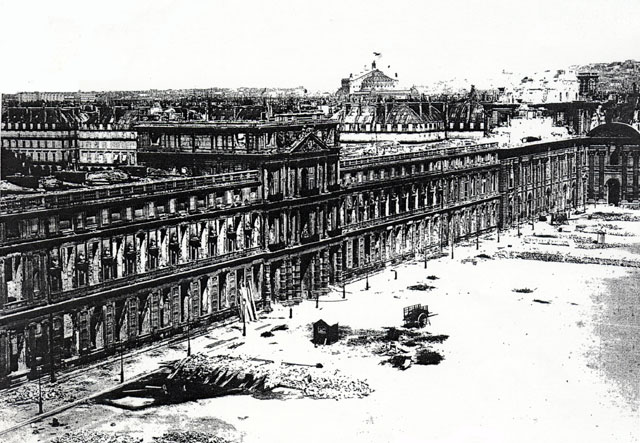
Palace façade after the arson

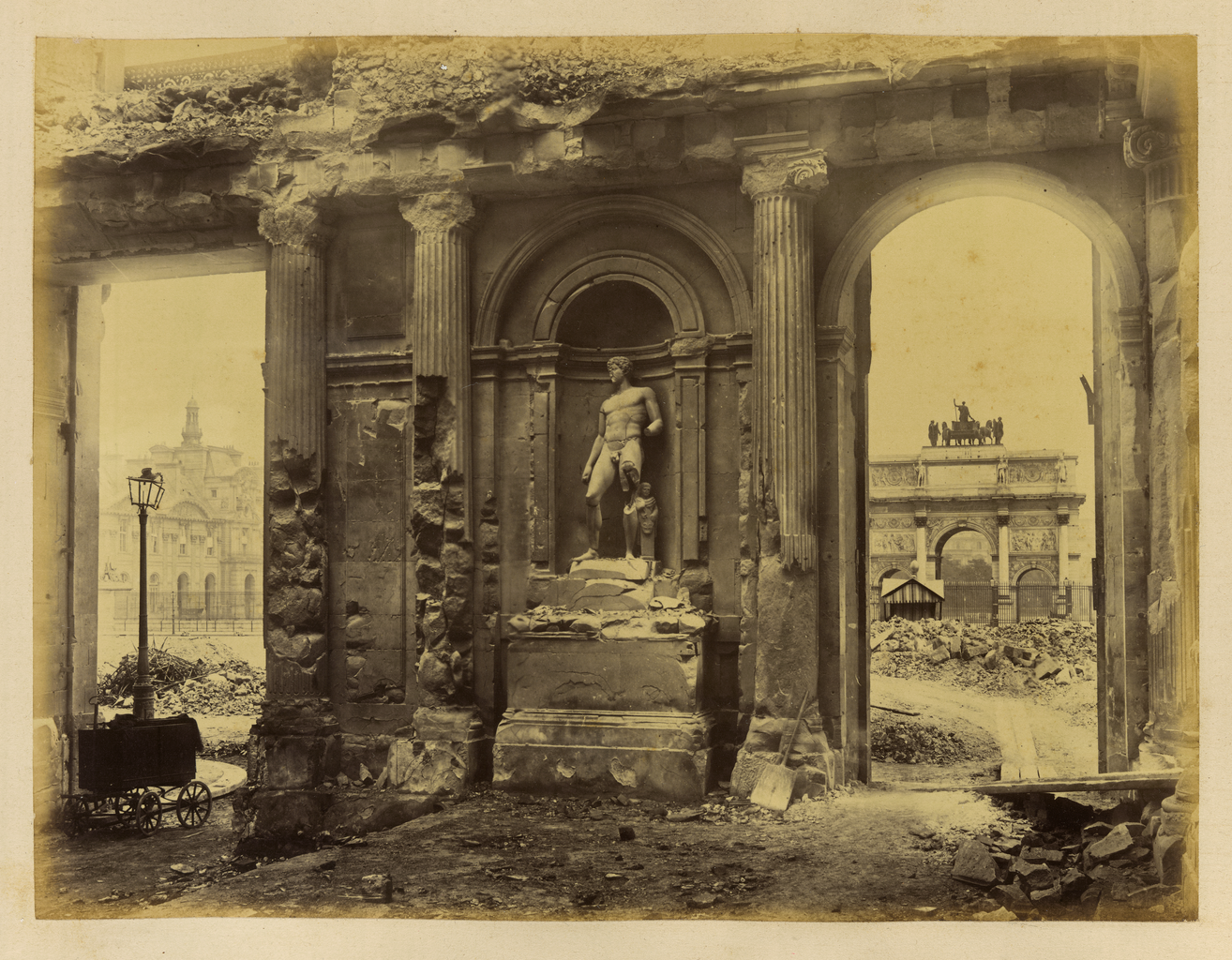
Main hall after the arson

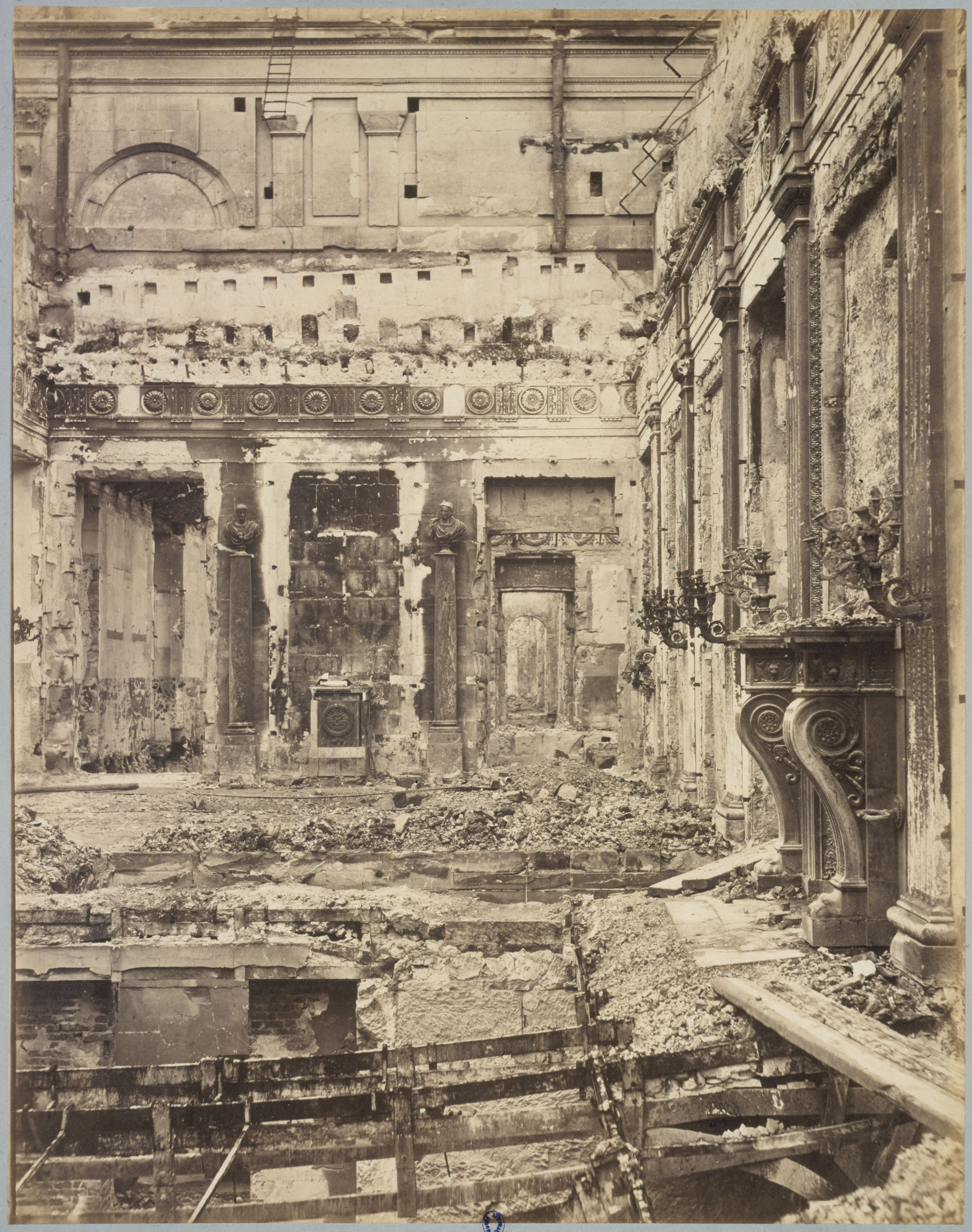
Galerie de la Paix after the arson

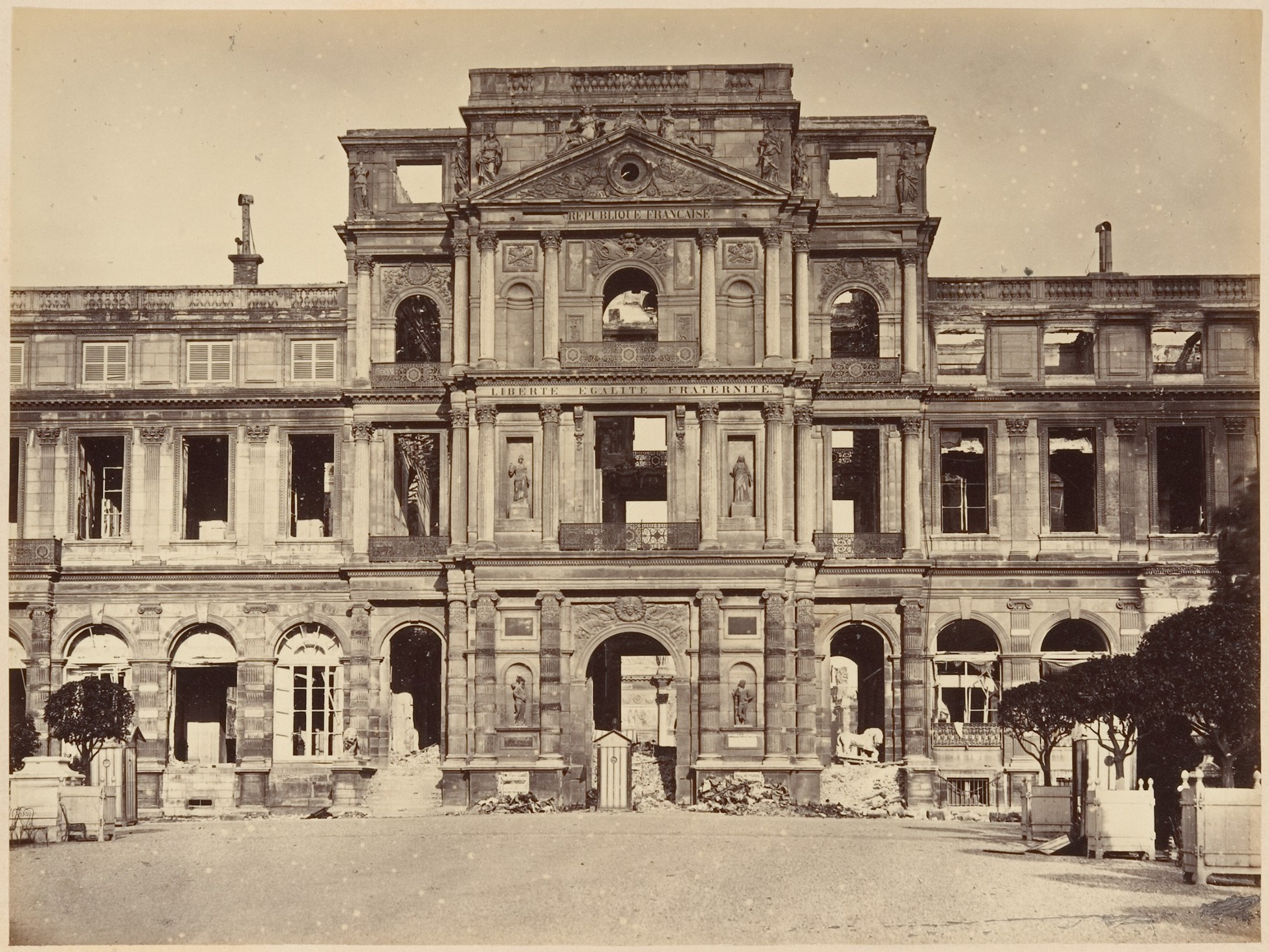
Ruins of the Palace after the arson, with walls intact

On 23 May 1871, during the suppression of the Paris Commune, 12 men under the orders of the Commune's former chief military commander Jules Bergeret set the Tuileries on fire using petroleum, liquid tar, and turpentine. The fire lasted 48 hours and thoroughly gutted the palace, with the exception of the foundations and the Arc de Triomphe du Carrousel. The dome itself was blown up by explosives placed in the central pavilion and detonated by the fires. In his note to the Committee of Public Safety, Bergeret said, 'The last vestiges of Royalty have just disappeared. I wish that the same may befall all the public buildings of Paris.' It was not until 25 May that the Paris fire brigades and the 26th battalion of the Chasseurs d'Afrique managed to put out the fire. The library and other portions of the Louvre were also set on fire by Communards and entirely destroyed. The museum itself was saved by the efforts of firemen.

The ruins of the Tuileries stood on the site for 11 years. Although the roofs and the inside of the palace had been utterly destroyed by the fire, the stone walls of the palace remained intact and restoration was possible. Other monuments of Paris also set on fire by Communards, such as the City Hall, were rebuilt in the 1870s. After much hesitation, the Third Republic, more sympathetic to the Commune, pardoned the Commune members exiled abroad. In 1882, despite opposition from Georges-Eugène Haussmann and historians, they had the walls torn down.

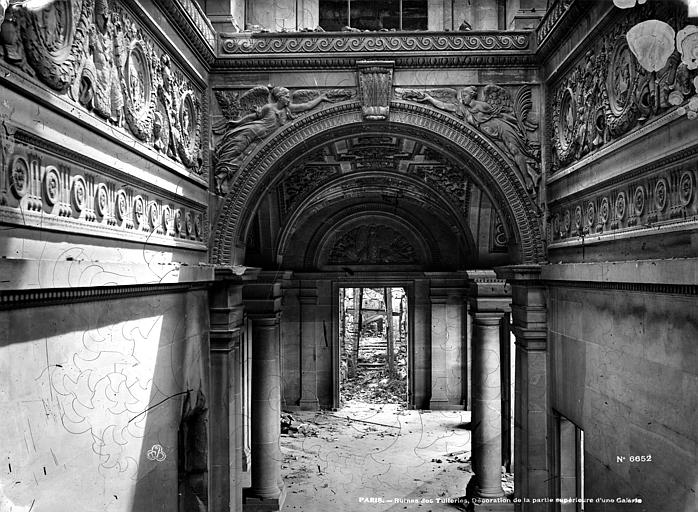
Palace interior cleaned up after the arson (1871–1883)

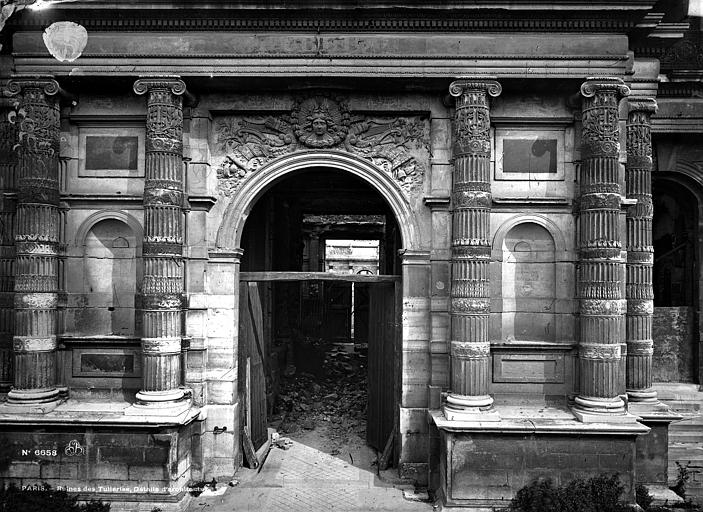
Palace portal after the fire (1871–1883)

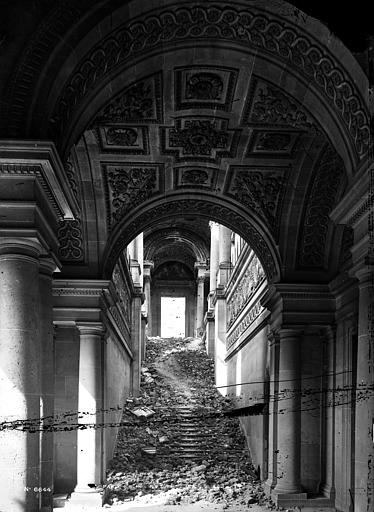
Ruins of the grand staircase (1871–1883)

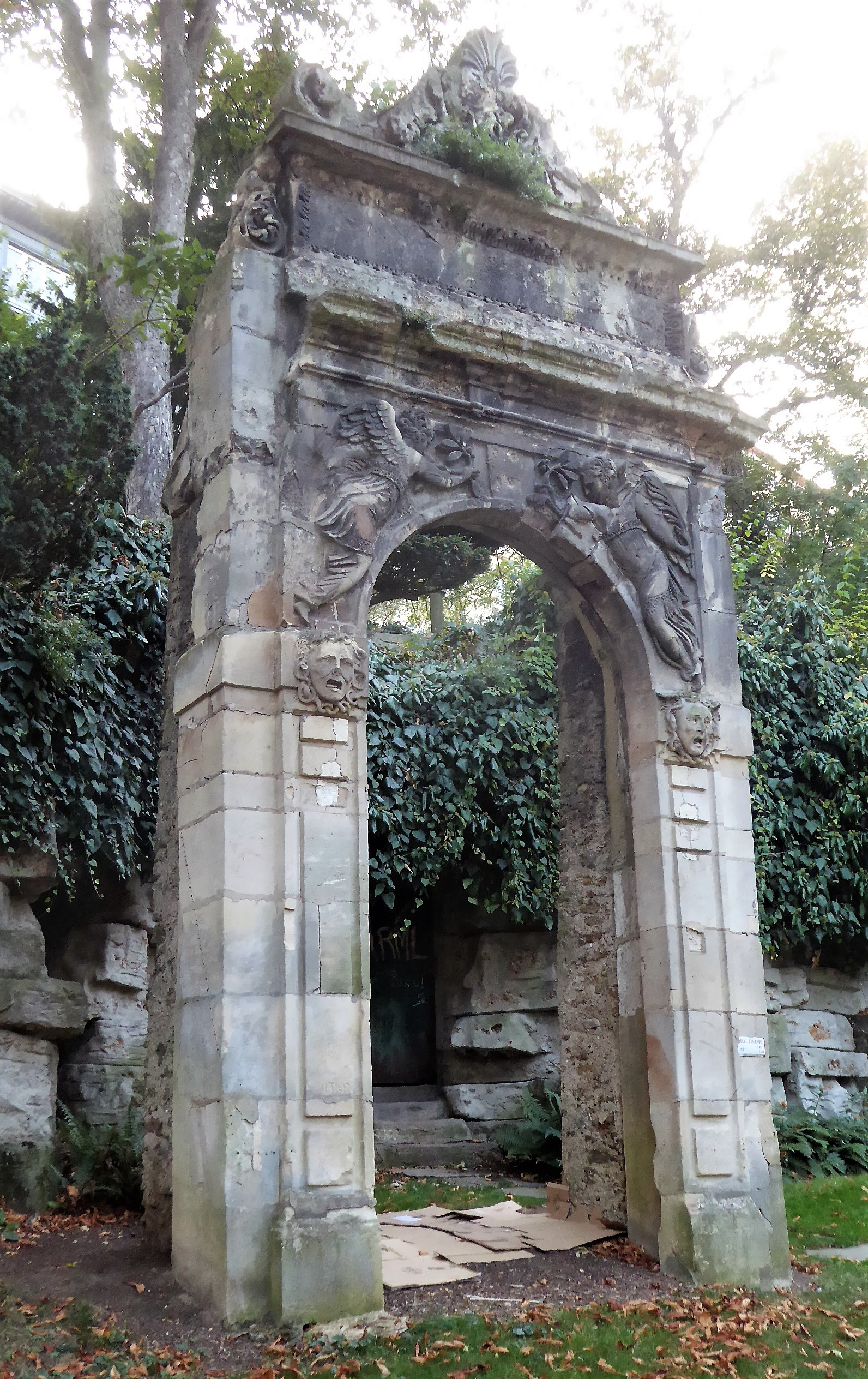
A vestige of the palace now in the gardens of the Palais du Trocadéro

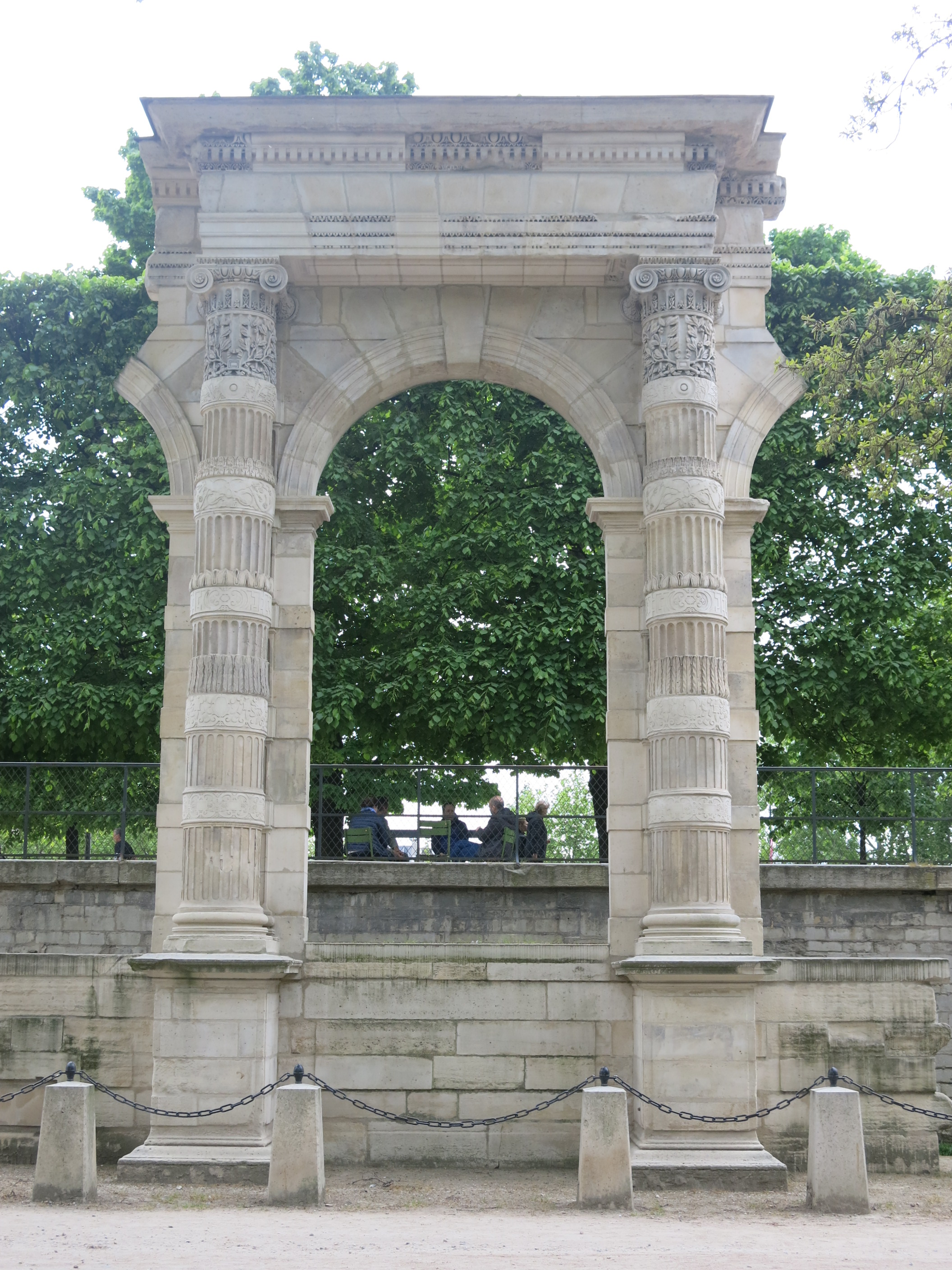
Vestige of the palace in the Tuileries Garden

The demolition was started in February 1883 and was completed on 30 September 1883. Bits of stone and marble from the palace were sold by a private entrepreneur, Achille Picart, as souvenirs, and even to build a palace in Corsica, near Ajaccio, the Château de la Punta, which is essentially a reconstruction of the Pavillon de Bullant. The courtyard pediment of the central pavilion can be seen in Paris's Georges Cain Square, other pieces are found in the garden of the Palais du Trocadéro, the Louvre and the Museum of Decorative Arts. In addition, other parts of the palace are located within France in Arcueil, Barentin, Roybet Fould Museum in Courbevoie, Château de Varax in Marcilly-d'Azergues, Nantes, Saint-Raphaël and Salins, and other countries such as Schwanenwerder in Berlin, Germany, Bordighera in Italy and Palacio de Carondelet in Quito, Ecuador.

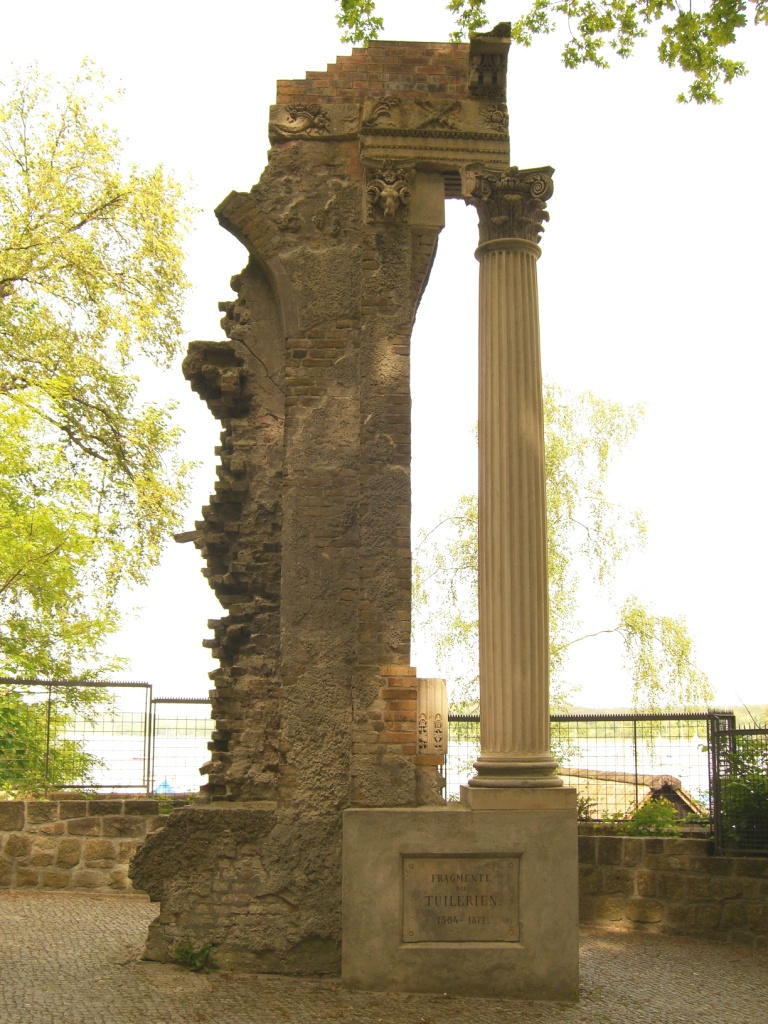
A column from the palace is located on Schwanenwerder island in Berlin, Germany

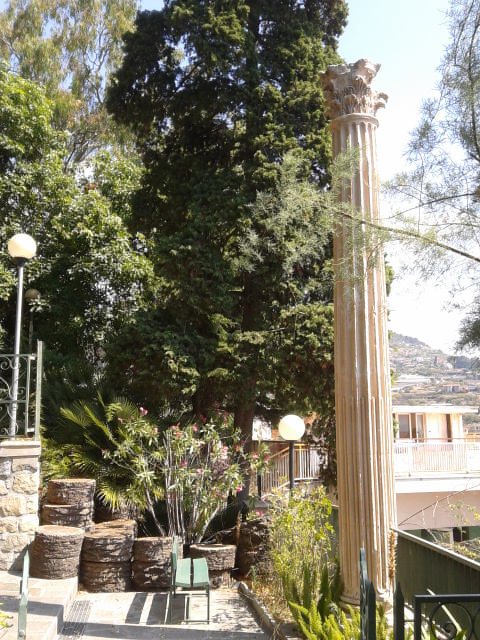
A column at Villa Garnier in Bordighera, Italy

== The Tuileries Garden and the Axe historique ==
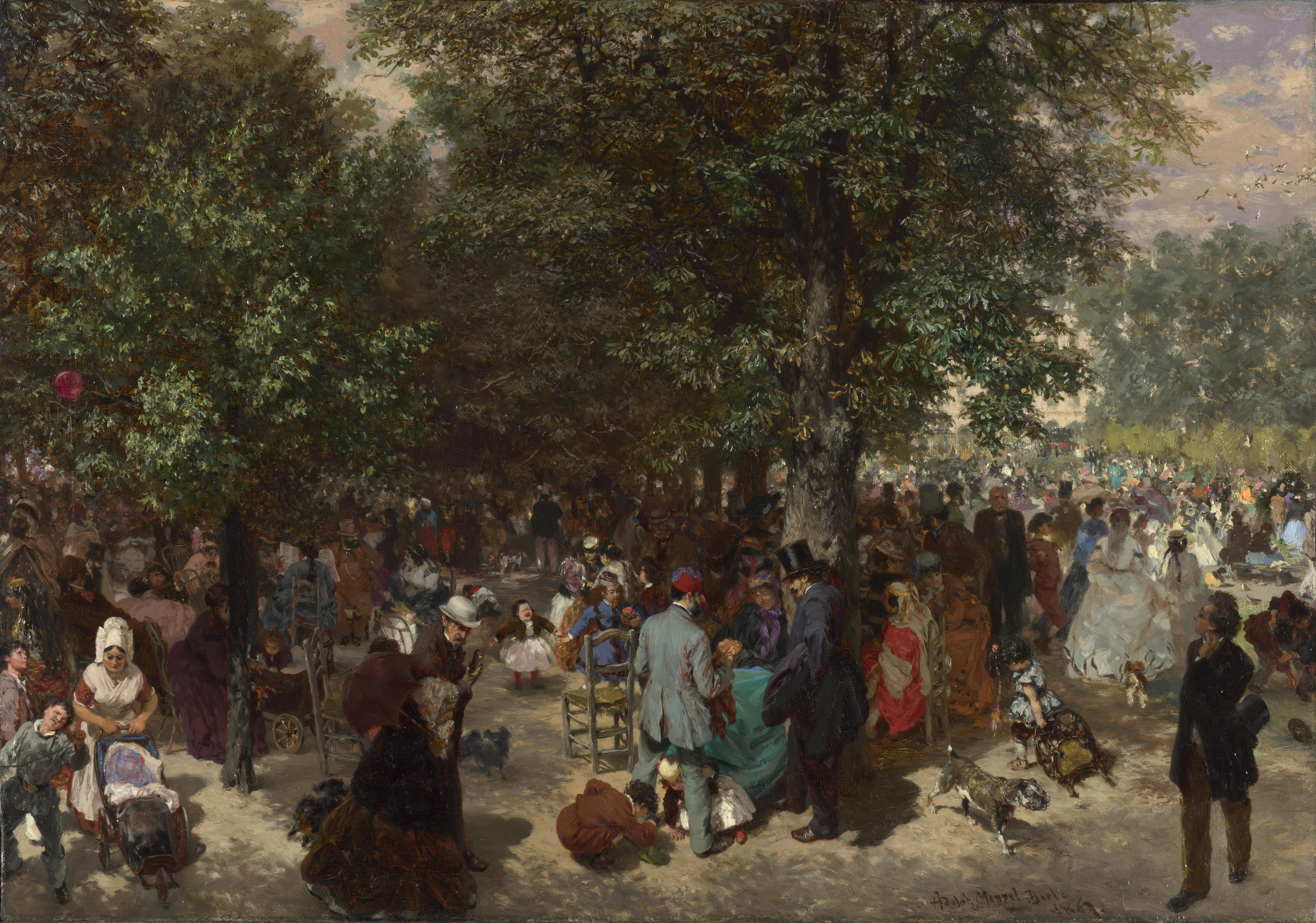
Afternoon at the Tuileries Park by Adolph von Menzel

=== Tuileries Garden ===
The Tuileries Garden (French: Jardin des Tuileries) covers 22.4 hectares (55 acres); is surrounded by the Louvre (to the east), the Seine (to the south), the Place de la Concorde (to the west) and the Rue de Rivoli (to the north); and still closely follows the design laid out by the royal landscape architect André Le Nôtre in 1664. The Jeu de Paume is a museum of contemporary art located in the northwest corner of the garden.

Originally designed in 1564 as an Italian Renaissance garden by Bernard de Carnesse, the Tuileries Garden was redesigned in 1664 by Le Nôtre as a jardin à la française, which emphasised symmetry, order, and long perspectives. His formal garden plan drew out the perspective from the reflecting pools one to the other in an unbroken vista along a central axis from the west palace façade, which has been extended as the Axe historique.

=== The Axe historique ===
This straight line which runs through the Place de la Concorde and the Arc de Triomphe to La Défense was originally centred on the façade of the Tuileries, a similar line leading across the entrance court of the Louvre. As the two façades were placed at slightly differing angles, this resulted in a slight 'kink' on the site of the palace, a feature ultimately dictated by the curved course of the Seine.

After the palace was demolished in 1883, the large empty space between the northern and southern wings of the Louvre, familiar to modern visitors, was opened onto the unbroken Axe historique.

== Proposed reconstruction ==
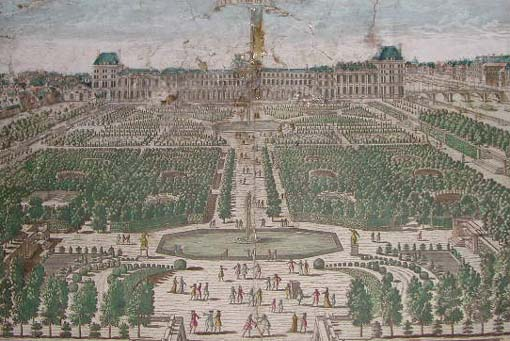
Le Nôtre's central axis of the Tuileries' parterres in a late 17th-century engraving

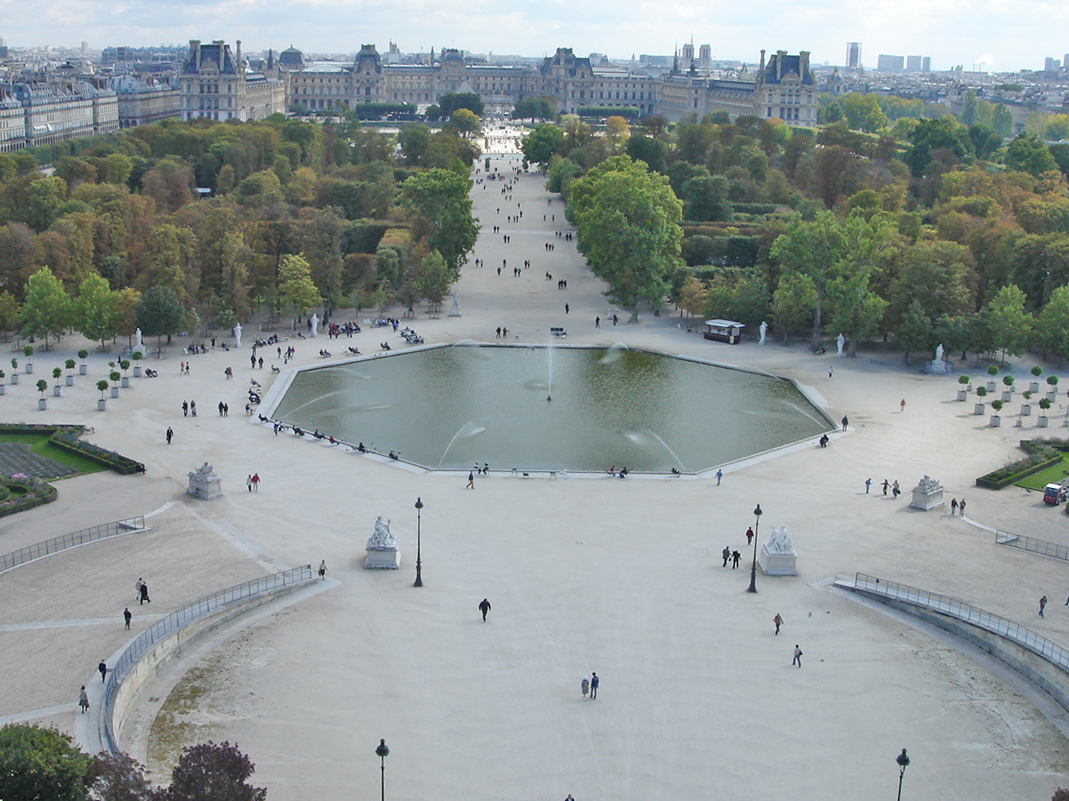
The same view today, past the palace's site to the Louvre Palace

In 2003, a group called the Committee for the Reconstruction of the Tuileries (French: Comité national pour la reconstruction des Tuileries) proposed the reconstruction of the Tuileries on its original site. Proponents of the plan noted that much of the original furniture and paintings still existed, put into storage when the Franco-Prussian War began in 1870.

In 2006 a rebuilding of the Tuileries Palace was estimated to cost 300 million euros (£200 million pounds sterling or US$380 million). The plan was to finance the project by public subscription with the work being undertaken by a private foundation, with the French government spending no money on the project. The French president at that time, Jacques Chirac, called for a debate on the subject. Former president Charles de Gaulle had also supported reconstruction, saying that it would "make a jewel of the centre of Paris."

However, in 2008, Michel Clément, Director of Architecture and Heritage, stated: "From our point of view, the reconstruction of the Tuileries Palace is not a priority. In addition, it is not part of French heritage culture to resurrect monuments out of the ground ex nihilo. Rather, we are concerned with the vestiges that have survived."

== Gallery ==
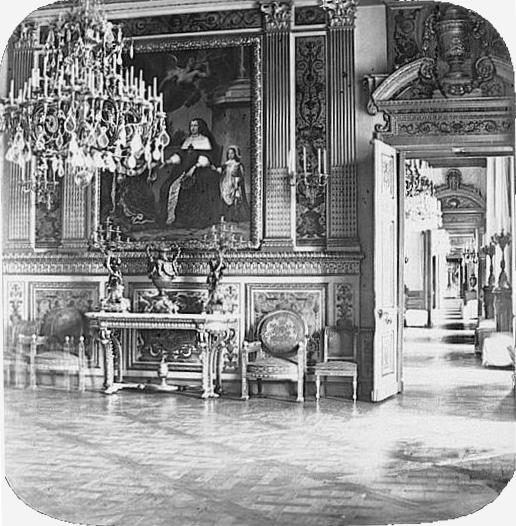
Salon Louis XIV

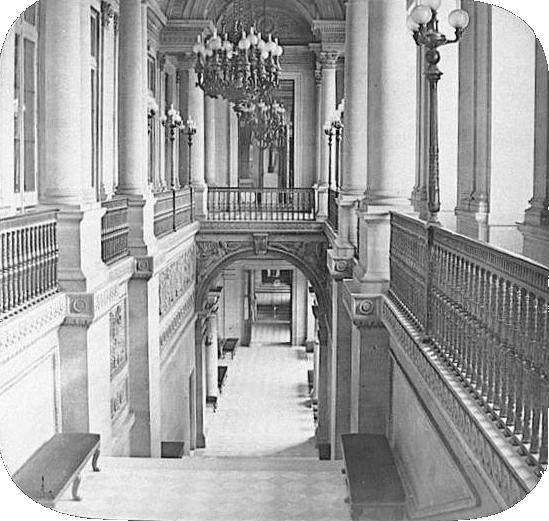
Grand staircase

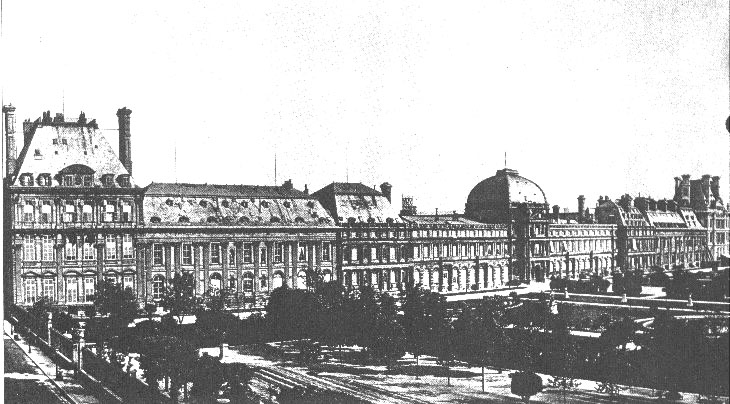
View from the Tuileries Gardens

== See also ==
- Pavillon de Flore

== Bibliography ==
- Ballon, Hilary (1991). The Paris of Henri IV: Architecture and Urbanism. Cambridge, Massachusetts: The MIT Press. ISBN 9780262023092.
- Coeyman, Barbara (1998). "Opera and Ballet in Seventeenth-Century French Theatres: Case Studies of the Salle des Machines and the Palais Royal Theater" in Radice 1998, pp. 37–71.
- Devêche, André (1981). The Tuileries Palace and Gardens, translated by Jonathan Eden. Paris: Éditions de la Tourelle-Maloine. OCLC 461768004, 13623823.
- Hautecoeur, Louis (1927). L'Histoire des Chateaux du Louvre et des Tuileries. Paris: G. Van Oest. OCLC 1748382, 250838397.
- Jacquin, Emmanuel (2000). Les Tuileries, Du Louvre à la Concorde. Paris: Editions du Patrimoine, Centres des Monuments Nationaux. ISBN 978-2-85822-296-4.
- Radice, Mark A., editor (1998). Opera in Context: Essays on Historical Staging from the Late Renaissance to the Time of Puccini. Portland, Oregon: Amadeus Press. ISBN 9781574670325.
