= Château de Varax =

The Château de Varax may refer to:

- Château de Varax (Marcilly-d'Azergues), historic chateau in Marcilly-d'Azergues, France.
- Château de Varax (Saint-Paul-de-Varax), historic chateau in Saint-Paul-de-Varax, France.
