= Château de Varax (Saint-Paul-de-Varax) =

Château in Auvergne-Rhône-Alpes, France

Coordinates: 46°05′59″N 5°08′34″E

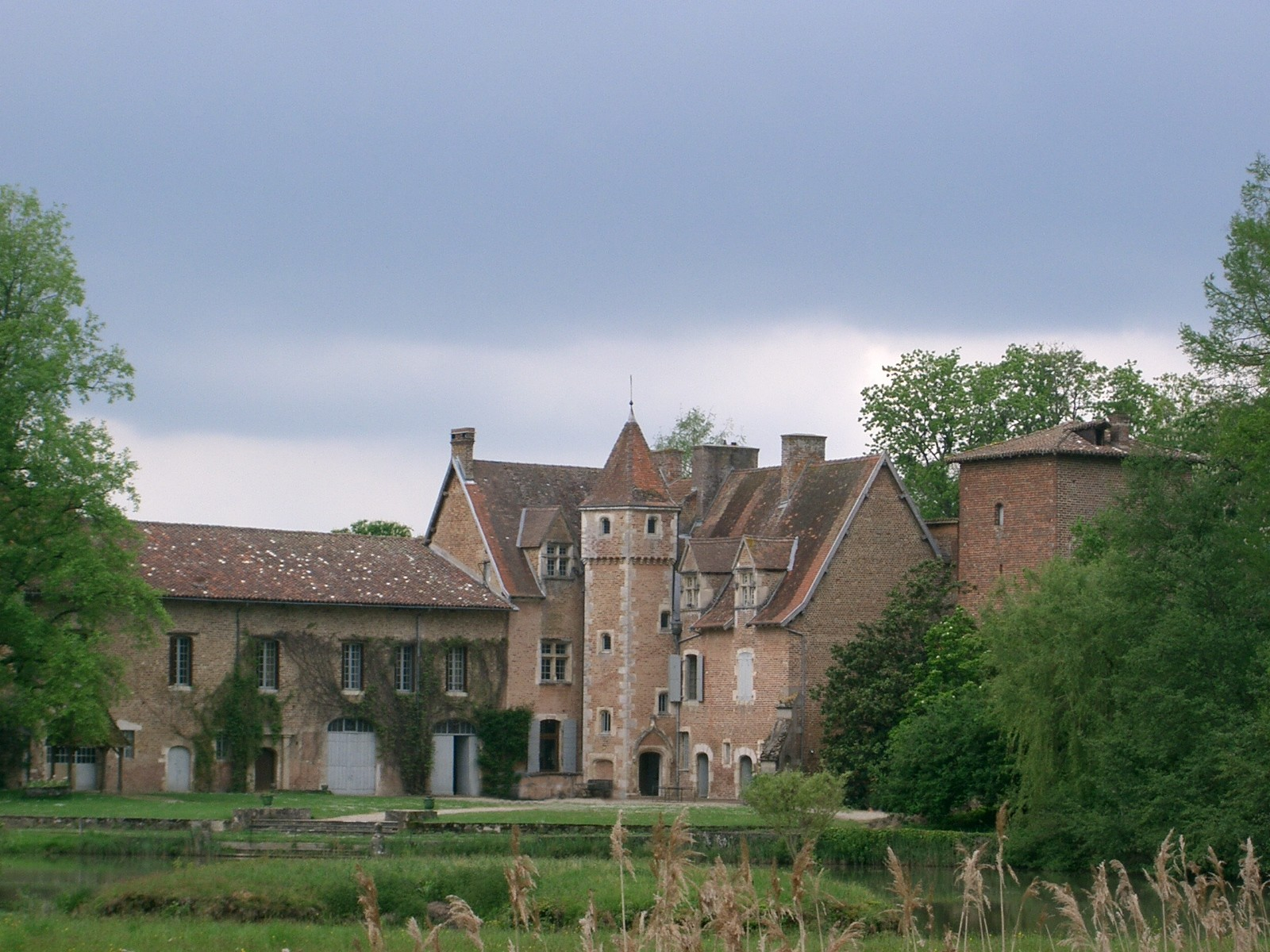
The Château de Varax in 2006

The Château de Varax is a historic château in Saint-Paul-de-Varax, Ain, France. It was built in the 14th century. It was almost destroyed in 1593, and subsequently rebuilt. It has been listed as an official historical monument since September 29, 1981.
