= Château de Varax (Marcilly-d'Azergues) =

Château in Auvergne-Rhône-Alpes, France

Coordinates: 45°52′06″N 4°43′31″E

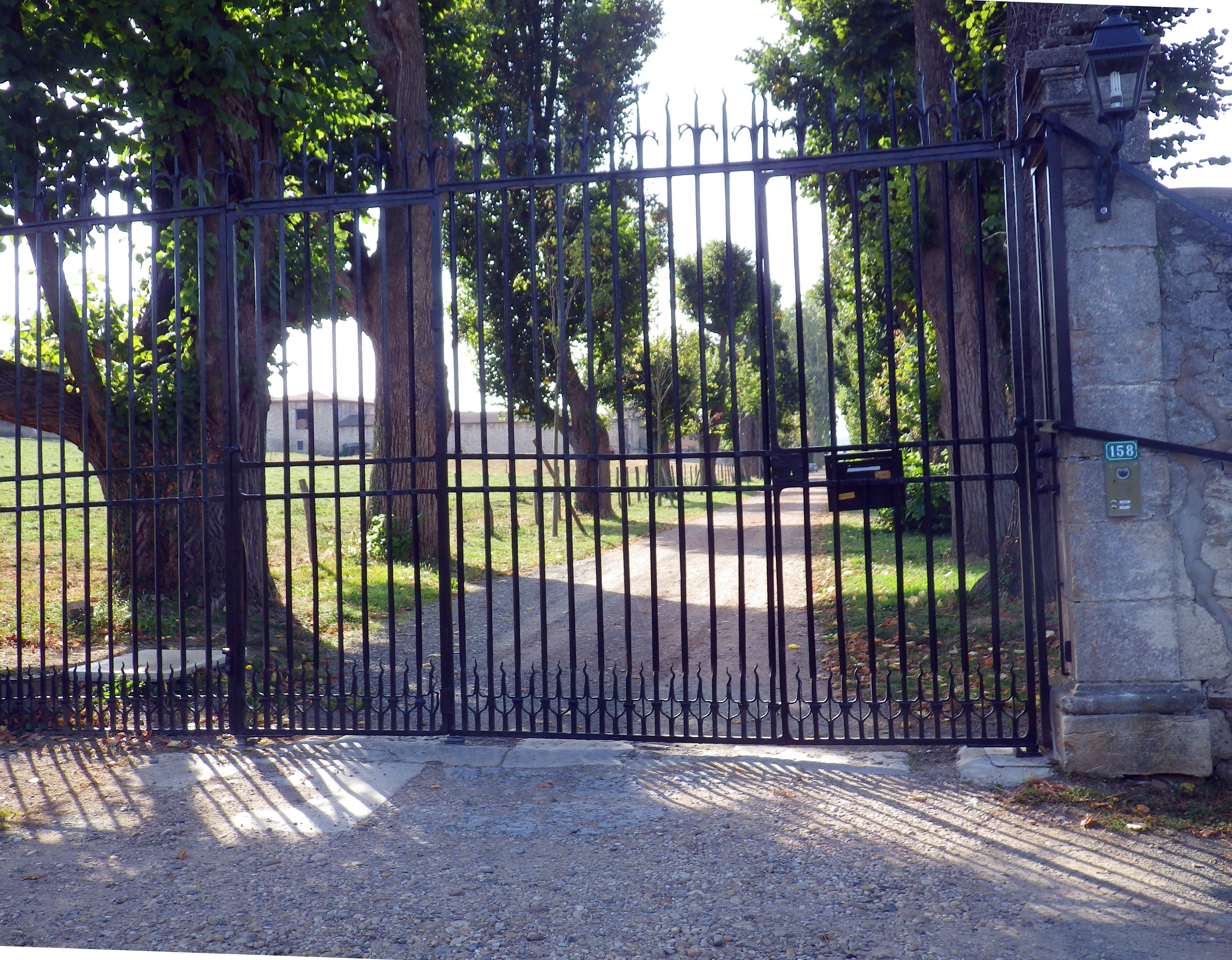
Château de Varax

The Château de Varax is a château in Marcilly-d'Azergues, Rhône, France. It was built in the 17th and 18th centuries. It has been listed as an official historical monument since December 26, 2012.
