= Marcilly-d'Azergues =

- Commune
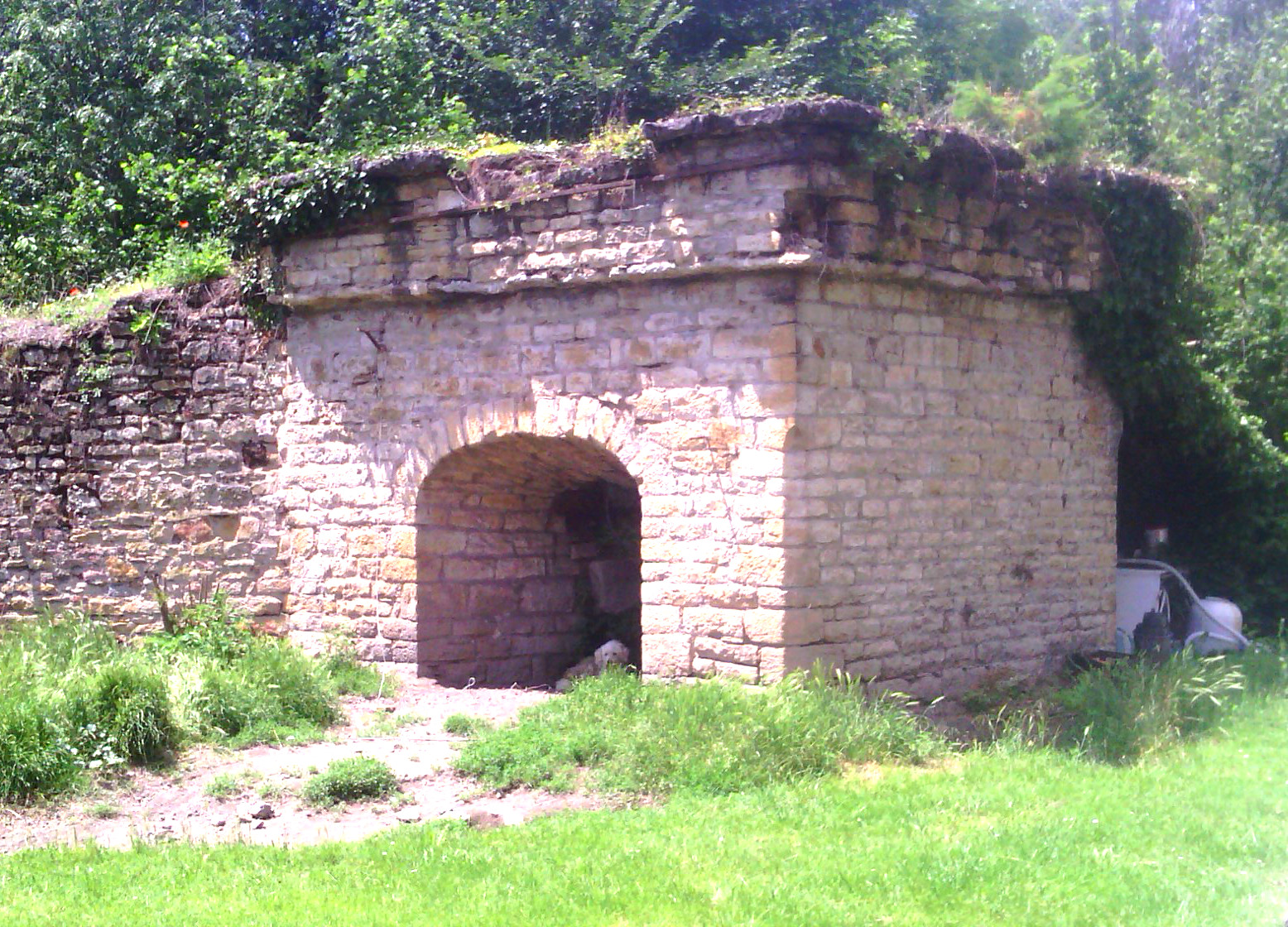
- The lime kiln in Marcilly-d'Azergues

- Coat of arms
- Location of Marcilly-d'Azergues
- Location within France Location within Auvergne-Rhône-Alpes
- Coordinates: 45°52′21″N 4°43′49″E
- Country: France
- Region: Auvergne-Rhône-Alpes
- Department: Rhône
- Arrondissement: Villefranche-sur-Saône
- Canton: Anse
- Intercommunality: Beaujolais-Pierres Dorées

Government
  - Mayor (2020–2026): Frédéric Blanchon
- Area^{1}: 4.18 km^{2} (1.61 sq mi)
- Elevation: 260 m (850 ft)
- Highest elevation: 305 m (1,001 ft)
- Lowest elevation: 180 m (590 ft)
- Population (2023): 1,066
  - Density: 255/km^{2} (661/sq mi)
- Time zone: UTC+01:00 (CET)
  - Summer (DST): UTC+02:00 (CEST)
- INSEE/Postal code: 69125 /69380
- ^{1} French Land Register data, which excludes lakes, ponds, glaciers > 1 km^{2} (0.386 sq mi or 247 acres) and river estuaries.

Marcilly-d'Azergues is a commune in the Rhône department in eastern France.

== See also ==
- Communes of the Rhône department
