= Lozanne =

- Commune
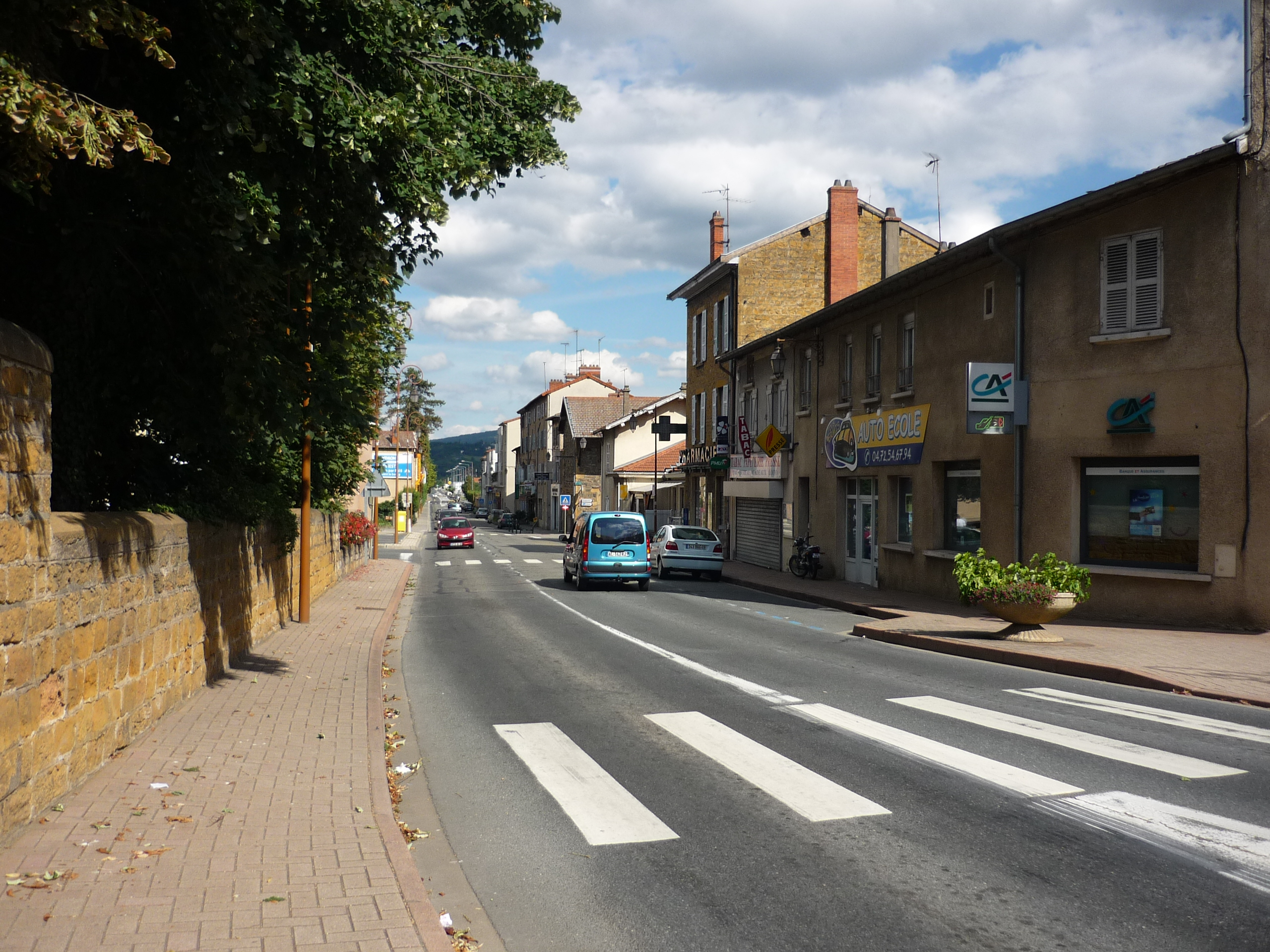
- The D385, passing through Lozanne

- Coat of arms
- Location of Lozanne
- Location within France Location within Auvergne-Rhône-Alpes
- Coordinates: 45°51′29″N 4°40′54″E
- Country: France
- Region: Auvergne-Rhône-Alpes
- Department: Rhône
- Arrondissement: Villefranche-sur-Saône
- Canton: Anse
- Intercommunality: Beaujolais-Pierres Dorées

Government
  - Mayor (2020–2026): Christian Gallet
- Area^{1}: 5.5 km^{2} (2.1 sq mi)
- Elevation: 202 m (663 ft)
- Highest elevation: 320 m (1,050 ft)
- Lowest elevation: 197 m (646 ft)
- Population (2023): 3,182
  - Density: 580/km^{2} (1,500/sq mi)
- Time zone: UTC+01:00 (CET)
  - Summer (DST): UTC+02:00 (CEST)
- INSEE/Postal code: 69121 /69380
- ^{1} French Land Register data, which excludes lakes, ponds, glaciers > 1 km^{2} (0.386 sq mi or 247 acres) and river estuaries.

Lozanne (French pronunciation: [lɔzan]) is a French commune located in the Rhône department, in the Auvergne-Rhône-Alpes region. Its inhabitants are called Lozannais in French.

== Geography ==
- Lozanne is located at the southern end of the Beaujolais mountains.
- Located 10 km (6.2 mi) away from Anse, 16 km (9.9 mi) from Villefranche-sur-Saône, 21 km (13 mi) from Lyon.
- There are 8 neighboring municipalities around Lozanne: Civrieux-d'Azergues to the East, Chazay-d'Azergues to the North-East, Saint-Jean-des-Vignes to the North, Belmont-d'Azergues to the North-West, Châtillon to the West, Fleurieux-sur-l'Arbresle to the South-West, Lentilly to the South and Dommartin to the South-East.
- The river Azergues, a tributary of the Saône, flows through Lozanne.

== Population ==
Historical population
| Year | Pop. | ±% p.a. |
|---|---|---|
| 1968 | 896 | — |
| 1975 | 1,347 | +6.00% |
| 1982 | 1,704 | +3.42% |
| 1990 | 1,645 | −0.44% |
| 1999 | 2,157 | +3.06% |
| 2007 | 2,269 | +0.63% |
| 2012 | 2,483 | +1.82% |
| 2017 | 2,626 | +1.13% |
| 2023 | 3,182 | +3.25% |
Source: INSEE

== See also ==
- Communes of the Rhône department
