= Blazon =

Art of describing heraldic arms in proper terms

In heraldry and heraldic vexillology, a blazon is a formal description of a coat of arms, flag, or similar emblem, from which the reader can reconstruct an accurate image. The verb to blazon means to create such a description. The visual depiction of a coat of arms or flag has traditionally had considerable latitude in design, but a verbal blazon specifies the essentially distinctive elements. A coat of arms or flag is therefore primarily defined not by a picture but rather by the wording of its blazon (though in modern usage flags are often additionally and more precisely defined using geometrical specifications). Blazon is also the specialized language in which a blazon is written. Blazonry is the art, craft or practice of creating a blazon. The language employed in blazonry has its own vocabulary and syntax, which becomes essential for comprehension when blazoning a complex coat of arms.

Other armorial objects and devices – such as badges, banners, and seals – may also be described in blazon.

The noun and verb blazon (referring to a verbal description) are not to be confused with the noun emblazonment, or the verb to emblazon, both of which relate to the graphic representation of a coat of arms or heraldic device.

== Etymology ==
The word blazon is derived from French blason, 'shield'. It is found in English by the end of the 14th century.

Formerly, heraldic authorities believed that the word was related to the German verb blasen 'to blow (a horn)'. Present-day lexicographers reject this theory as conjectural and disproved.

== Grammar ==
Blazon is generally designed to eliminate ambiguity of interpretation, to be as concise as possible, and to avoid repetition and extraneous punctuation. English antiquarian Charles Boutell stated in 1864:

Heraldic language is most concise, and it is always minutely exact, definite, and explicit; all unnecessary words are omitted, and all repetitions are carefully avoided; and, at the same time, every detail is specified with absolute precision. The nomenclature is equally significant, and its aim is to combine definitive exactness with a brevity that is indeed laconic.

However, John Brooke-Little, Norroy and Ulster King of Arms, wrote in 1985: "Although there are certain conventions as to how arms shall be blazoned ... many of the supposedly hard and fast rules laid down in heraldic manuals [including those by heralds] are often ignored."

A given coat of arms may be drawn in many different ways, all considered equivalent and faithful to the blazon, just as the letter "A" may be printed in many different fonts while still being the same letter. For example, the shape of the escutcheon is almost always immaterial, with very limited exceptions (e.g., the coat of arms of Nunavut, for which a round shield is specified).

The main conventions of blazon are as follows:

- Every blazon of a coat of arms begins by describing the field (background), with the first letter capitalised, followed by a comma ",". In a majority of cases this is a single tincture; e.g. Azure (blue).
- If the field is complex, the variation is described, followed by the tinctures used; e.g. Chequy gules and argent (checkered red and white).
- If the shield is divided, the division is described, followed by the tinctures of the subfields, beginning with the dexter side (shield bearer's right, but viewer's left) of the chief (upper) edge; e.g. Party per pale argent and vert (dexter half silver, sinister half green), or Quarterly argent and gules (clockwise from viewer's top left, i.e. dexter chief: white, red, white, red). In the case of a divided shield, it is common for the word "party" or "parted" to be omitted (e.g., Per pale argent and vert, a tree eradicated counterchanged).
- Some authorities prefer to capitalise the names of tinctures and charges, but this convention is far from universal. Where tinctures are not capitalised, an exception may be made for the metal Or, in order to avoid confusion with the English word "or". Where space is at a premium, tincture names may be abbreviated: e.g., ar. for argent, gu. for gules, az. for azure, sa. for sable, and purp. for purpure.
- Following the description of the field, the principal ordinary or ordinaries and charge(s) are named, with their tincture(s); e.g., a bend or.
- The principal ordinary or charge is followed by any other charges placed on or around it. If a charge is a bird or a beast, its attitude is defined, followed by the creature's tincture, followed by anything that may be differently coloured; e.g. An eagle displayed gules armed and wings charged with trefoils or (see the coat of arms of Brandenburg below). If the charge is a tree then it may be described by its shape or its leaves; eradicated means its roots are shown.
- Counterchanged means that a charge which straddles a line of division is given the same tinctures as the divided field, but reversed (see the arms of Behnsdorf below).
- A quartered (composite) shield is blazoned one quarter (panel) at a time, proceeding by rows from chief (top) to base, and within each row from dexter (the right side of the bearer holding the shield) to sinister; in other words, from the viewer's left to right.
- Following the description of the shield, any additional components of the achievement – such as crown/coronet, helmet, torse, mantling, crest, motto, supporters and compartment – are described in turn, using the same terminology and syntax.
- A convention often followed historically was to name a tincture explicitly only once within a given blazon. If the same tincture was found in different places within the arms, this was addressed either by ordering all elements of like tincture together prior to the tincture name (e.g., Argent, two chevrons and a canton gules); or by naming the tincture only at its first occurrence, and referring to it at subsequent occurrences obliquely, for example by use of the phrase "of the field" (e.g., Argent, two chevrons and on a canton gules a lion passant of the field); or by reference to its numerical place in the sequence of named tinctures (e.g., Argent, two chevrons and on a canton gules a lion passant of the first: in both these examples, the lion is argent). However, these conventions are now avoided by the College of Arms in London, England, and by most other formal granting bodies, as they may introduce ambiguity to complex blazons.
- It is common to print all heraldic blazons in italic. Heraldry has its own vocabulary, word-order and punctuation, and presenting it in italics indicates to the reader the use of a quasi-foreign language.
Azure, a bend or. A coat made famous by the medieval court case Scrope v. Grosvenor.

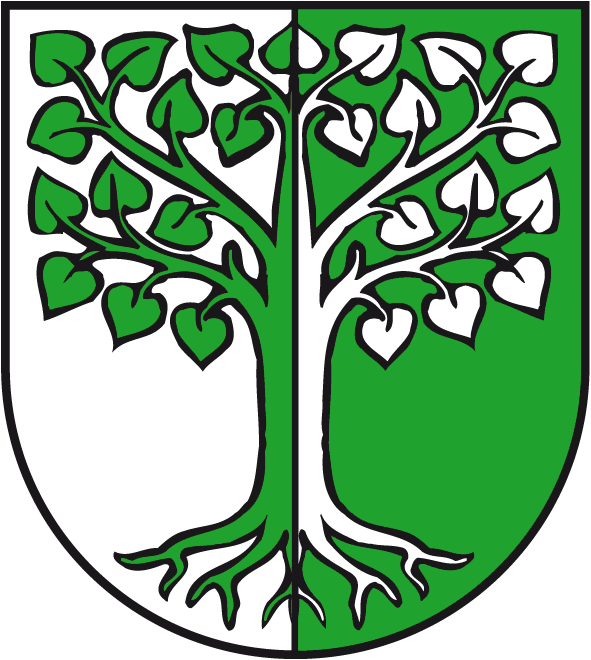
Party per pale argent and vert, a tree eradicated counterchanged. Arms of Behnsdorf.

Argent, an eagle displayed gules armed and wings charged with trefoils Or. Arms of Brandenburg.

Quarterly 1st and 4th Sable a lion rampant on a canton Argent a cross Gules; 2nd and 3rd quarterly Argent and Gules in the 2nd and 3rd quarters a fret Or overall on a bend Sable three escallops of the first and as an augmentation in chief an inescutcheon, Argent a cross Gules and thereon an inescutcheon Azure, three fleurs-de-lis Or. Arms of Churchill.

=== French vocabulary and grammar ===
Because heraldry developed at a time when English clerks wrote in Anglo-Norman French, many terms in English heraldry are of French origin. Some of the details of the syntax of blazon also follow French practice: thus, adjectives are normally placed after nouns rather than before.

A number of heraldic adjectives may be given in either a French or an anglicised form: for example, a cross pattée or a cross patty; a cross fitchée or a cross fitchy. In modern English blazons, the anglicised form tends to be preferred.

Where the French form is used, a problem may arise as to the appropriate adjectival ending, determined in normal French usage by gender and number.

To describe two hands as appaumées, because the word main is feminine in French, savours somewhat of pedantry. A person may be a good armorist, and a tolerable French scholar, and still be uncertain whether an escallop-shell covered with bezants should be blazoned as bezanté or bezantée.

— (John Edwin Cussans), The Handbook of Heraldry,

The usual convention in English heraldry is to adhere to the feminine singular form, for example: a chief undée and a saltire undée, even though the French nouns chef and sautoir are in fact masculine. Efforts have been made to ignore grammatical correctness, for example by J. E. Cussans, who suggested that all French adjectives should be expressed in the masculine singular, without regard to the gender and number of the nouns they qualify, thus a chief undé and a saltire undé.

== Principles of the composition or reading of a blazon ==
=== The shield ===
As the most central, most essential, and most often unique element of an armorial achievement, the shield is described first in the blazon, which sometimes limits itself to this description alone, either due to the absence of external ornaments, or because they do not bring anything significant.

The arms can be of different types, and the way to blazon depends on this type:

- simple arms form the general case of a field most often uniform, possibly charged with ordinaries or other charges (they are said to be plain otherwise);
- composed arms adjoin two or more arms, separated by partition lines forming quarters (this term being taken in an extended sense), each of them behaving like simple arms.

==== Simple arms ====
The first component of the shield to describe is the field.

| Simple field: the shield is entirely covered with a colour, a metal, or a fur, which may or may not receive ordinaries or other charges. The field's tincture is named, then the charges: Gules, a chevron or (Les Essarts). A field without charges is said to be plain. (Right: ermine plain for Brittany). See also: Colour (heraldry) |
| Divided field: the field is not of a single tincture, but of two (or rarely more) separated by some geometric pattern. The blazon specifies the partition, then the two (or more) tinctures, following the rule chief before base, then dexter before sinister. If a charge lies across such a partition, it are said to be "over all": Per fess argent and azure, over all a lion or, armed and langued gules (left, Villeroux family). In a divided field, a charge crossing the partition is sometimes counterchanged: Per pale argent and azure, a fleur-de-lis counterchanged (right, Hoecklin de Steineck family), meaning that the half of the fleur-de-lis resting on the argent half is azure, and vice versa, argent on the azure half. |
| Patterned field: the field is divided into many small regular elements, most often using two alternating colors. Each element being too small to constitute an autonomous element, the entire field is often described as a simple field with a specific name according to the type of partition: lozengy or and gules (left, ancient counts of Angoulême). If it is charged, the charges are blazoned as overall on this composed field: Lozengy vert and gules, overall in dexter chief a mullet with a comet's tail curved in bend all or (right, Lachassagne). Similarly to the previous case, an ordinary can be counterchanged, which can lead to complex geometric patterns despite a relatively simple description. |

After stating the field, one enumerates the charges, starting with the largest or most central.

| The charge is an ordinary: it has an assigned place, and in the simplest case, it suffices to specify its color. Argent, a fess gules (left, Béthune). If the ordinary is bounded by other than straight lines, these are described before the tincture. If the ordinary is itself charged, this is blazoned afterwards. Ex: ermine, on a chief indented gules, a scallop or (right, Mortrée). |
| A non-ordinary charge has no specific place, but by default, it is placed in the center of the field. Argent, a rose gules (left, Pacy-sur-Eure). If the charge has particularities (of shape, posture, etc.), this must be blazoned with specific terms (most often participles of verbs). Any charge can itself be charged, although this is quite rare other than on ordinaries. ex.: Gules, an eight-pointed star or charged with a double-headed eagle sable, membered, beaked, and crowned of the field (right, Marquis de Sade). |
| Exceptions.: Some diminutives of ordinaries can, like other charges, be found in unusual places.; Or, a bend gules charged in chief with a cross trefly argent set palewise (left). |

In English blazon, an ordinary is followed by any surrounding charges, and then finally by any charges on the ordinary: Gules, on a bend or between two mullets argent, three crescents sable. In French blazon, the order differs: De gueueles à la bande d'or, chargée de trois croissants de sable et accompagnée de deux molets d'argent (literally Of gules with the bend of gold, charged by three crescents of sable and accompanied by two mullets of silver; tinctures are nouns in French, adjectives in English).

==== Composed arms ====
| In composed arms, the blazon consists of several areas adjoined according to one or more simple partition figures, each area most often forming pre-existing arms designating a bearer. One states the partition, then each quarter is described in turn, the priority being: "chief before base, then dexter before sinister". – If necessary, one specifies for each quarter its order of appearance, which is marked in its simplest expression by a simple number (in 1, in 2, etc.) sometimes followed by a closing parenthesis (in 1), in 2), etc.): or with an ordinal in letters (in the first, in the second, etc.) or in figures (in the 1st, etc.): quartered in saltire: in the first azure a donjon argent, in the second gules a bunch of grapes, stalked and leaved argent, in the third gules a dexter arm argent with the index finger pointed, vested azure semé of fleurs-de-lis or, from which two drops also argent fall, in the fourth azure three fleurs-de-lis or ill-ordered (left, Écrouves). If two quarters are identical, which is frequent, they are described together at the time of the appearance of the first of the two: Quartered, in 1 and 4 of Navarre, in 2 of Bourbon, in 3 of Béarn (right, Antoine de Bourbon, King of Navarre). |
| Bearers: The quarters of composed arms are simpler arms, whose bearer it is possible to name in the blazon: Quartered, azure three fleurs-de-lis or, which is of France modern, and gules, which is of Albret. It is also possible to describe arms solely by the bearers, if the latter is sufficiently known for his blazon to be implicit: Quartered of France and England. |

=== The whole ===
In all cases, one then blazons the possible charges affecting the whole.

| The whole designates the entire shield that has been described up to this point, and which can be charged with complementary figures, which are then arranged as if everything preceding was plain: quartered in 1 and 4 azure three fleurs-de-lis or and in 2 and 3 gules three leopards or, a label argent overall (arms of Edward of Westminster). The designation of the whole can be ambiguous, in the case of composed arms, if the last quarter receives a figure overall on its whole, because several levels can be in the process of description not yet completed. In this case, it is better to specify on the whole of the quarter: Quartered, in I party: in 1 gules three leopards or (of England) and in 2 or, a lion gules, within a double tressure flory counter-flory of the same (of Scotland); in II azure three fleurs-de-lis or (of France); in III azure, a harp or stringed argent (of Ireland) and in IV tierced in pairle reversed, 1, gules, two leopards or; 2, or, semé of hearts gules, a lion azure, armed and langued of the second, overall; 3, gules, a horse rampant argent, harnessed or, an escutcheon gules overall on the whole of the quarter, a label of three points argent overall (George III). Here, if one did not specify overall on the whole, the label could only bear on the last named quarter whose description is still open, that is, not the escutcheon gules (since its description was closed by saying it was on the whole of the quarter) but on the tierced in pairle reversed. |

=== External ornaments ===
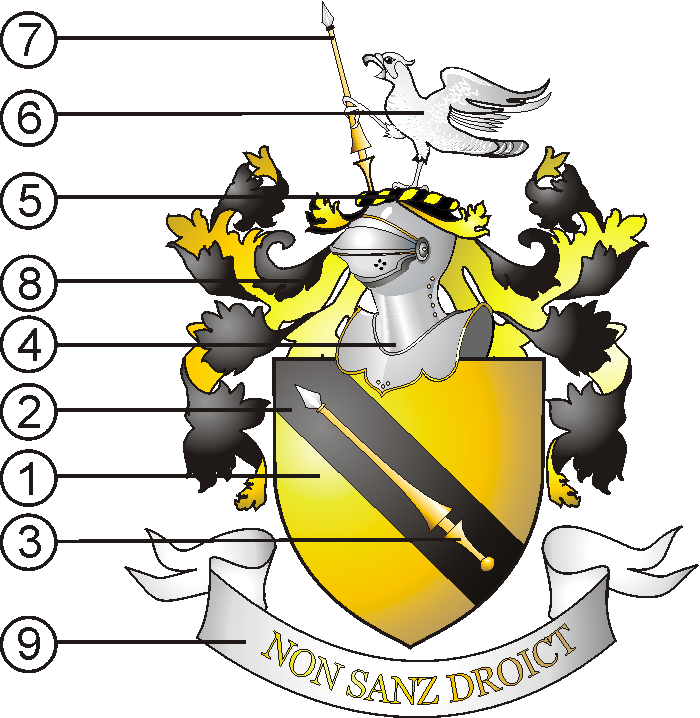
Examples of ornaments (blazon of the Shakespeares): helm (4) surmounted by (6&7) with mantling (8) topped by a crest (6) resting on a torse (9).

One blazons the external ornaments following the shield, going from the foreground to the background, and from the shield outward, but this order is not strictly fixed.

The external ornaments (headgear, collar and cords, supporters and compartment, mantles, flags, weapons, batons, scepters and hands of justice, keys, crosiers, motto, etc.) surround the shield to form the complete coat of arms, and sometimes specify the attributes of the bearer (his rank, his function… - especially in Empire heraldry).

These external ornaments can be very varied, and they are normally described with the same language as for the shield. However, the rigor is much less outside the shield than inside, the same goes for the language used, which must adapt to all the fantasies, licit in this part of the coat of arms.

As for the shield, shortcuts are common: thus for a coat of arms including flags, it is theoretically possible to describe each of them, but it is much clearer and simpler to indicate the presence of the flags "of France", "of Germany" and "of Poland", rather than to make their individual description.

Some figures are specific to external ornaments (flags, mantles), but in principle, any other external ornament can appear in the coat of arms.

== Complexity ==
Full descriptions of shields range in complexity, from a single word to a convoluted series describing compound shields:

- Arms of Brittany: Ermine
- Azure, a Bend Or, over which the families of Scrope and Grosvenor fought a famous legal battle (see Scrope v. Grosvenor and image above).
- Arms of Östergötland, Sweden: Gules, a Griffin with dragon wings tail and tongue rampant Or armed beaked langued and membered Azure between four Roses Argent.
- Arms of Hungary dating from 1867, when part of Austria-Hungary:

Quarterly I. Azure three Lions' Heads affronté Crowned Or (for Dalmatia); II. chequy Argent and Gules (for Croatia); III. Azure a River in Fess Gules bordered Argent thereon a Marten proper beneath a six-pointed star Or (for Slavonia); IV. per Fess Azure and Or over all a Bar Gules in the Chief a demi-Eagle Sable displayed addextré of the Sun-in-splendour and senestré of a Crescent Argent in the Base seven Towers three and four Gules (for Transylvania); enté en point Gules a double-headed Eagle proper on a Peninsula Vert holding a Vase pouring Water into the Sea Argent beneath a Crown proper with bands Azure (for Fiume); over all an escutcheon Barry of eight Gules and Argent impaling Gules on a Mount Vert a Crown Or issuant therefrom a double-Cross Argent (for Hungary).

Arms of Brittany

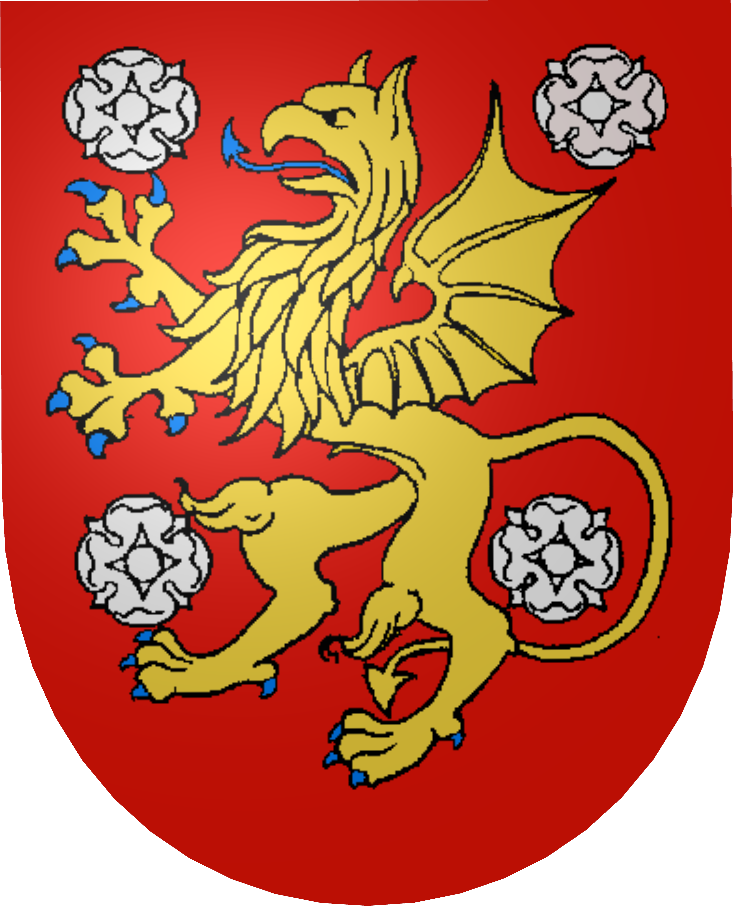
Arms of Östergötland

Arms of Hungary (1867)

== Simple example ==

- The former Alsace blazons thus: per pale, first, gules a bend argent between two cotises fleury of the same and second also gules a bend or between six crowns of the same, three in chief and three inverted in base.

== Complex examples ==
Principality of Liège.

Province of Liège.

- Principality of Liège: Quartered: 1. of Bouillon; 2. of Franchimont; 3. of Looz; 4. of Horn; overall of Liège (originally borne without L and G).
- Province of Liège: Quartered: 1. of Liège; 2. of Bouillon; 3. of Franchimont; 4. of Looz; enté in base of Horn.
  - Liège (City of Liège): Gules, a perron raised, supported by three lions on three steps, mounted with a pine cone, topped with a crosslet, all or, flanked by the capital letters L and G of the same.
  - Bouillon (Duchy of Bouillon): Gules, a fess argent.
  - Franchimont (Marquisate of Franchimont): Argent, three lion cubs vert, armed and langued gules, and crowned or.
  - Looz (County of Looz): Burely (10) or and gules.
  - Horn (County of Horn): Or, three hunting horns gules ill-ordered, ringed and stringed argent.

Arms of the Dukes of Mayenne.

- Arms of the Dukes of Mayenne:

"Quartered, in 1 and 4: per fess and per pale in 3, in the first barry gules and argent, in the second azure semé of fleurs-de-lis or and a label gules, in the third argent a cross potent or, cantoned with four crosslets of the same, in the fourth or four pallets gules, in the fifth azure semé of fleurs-de-lis or and a bordure gules, in the sixth azure a lion contourné or, armed, langued and crowned gules, in the seventh or a lion sable armed and langued gules, in the eighth azure semé of crosslets or and two barbels or. Overall or a bend gules charged with three alerions argent the whole differenced by a label gules; in 2 and 3 counter-quartered in 1 and 4 azure, an eagle argent, beaked, langued and crowned or and in 2 and 3 azure, three fleurs-de-lis or, a bordure indented gules and or."

| Heraldic term | Comment | Arms |
|---|---|---|
| Quartered, | Formed of four elements, which will be numbered 1, 2, 3, and 4, the reading order being from left to right then from top to bottom. | |
| in 1 and 4: | The elements at top left (1) and bottom right (4) are identical, and the description follows (these are the arms of the Dukes of Guise): | |
| per fess and per pale in 3, | This first element will be divided by a per fess (a horizontal line) and three per pale (vertical lines), making eight sub-elements. The numbering order will be from left to right 1, 2, 3, 4 (top row) then 5, 6, 7, and 8 (bottom row). | |
| in the first barry gules and argent, | (1) Arms of Hungary: banner of Árpád, founder of the first dynasty of kings of Hungary. | |
| in the second azure semé of fleurs-de-lis or and a label gules, | (2) Ancient arms of Anjou, on the field of France ancient. | |
| in the third argent a cross potent or, cantoned with four crosslets of the same | (3) Arms of the Kingdom of Jerusalem. | |
| in the fourth or four pallets gules | (4) Arms of the Kingdom of Aragon. Last element of the top row, moving to the next row. | |
| in the fifth azure semé of fleurs-de-lis or and a bordure gules, | (5) Arms of the Counts of Valois. | |
| in the sixth azure a lion contourné or, armed, langued and crowned gules, | (6) Duchy of Guelders, contourné by courtesy because these arms are joined to the following. | |
| in the seventh or a lion sable armed and langued gules, | (7) Duchy of Jülich, attached to the previous after 1379. | |
| in the eighth azure semé of crosslets or and two barbels or. | (8) Duchy of Bar, and end of the bottom row. | |
| Overall | Overall, thus forming an escutcheon brochant on the previous series: | |
| or a bend gules charged with three alerions argent | Arms of Lorraine. | |
| the whole differenced by a label gules; | The whole, therefore the entire quarter (and not only the arms of Lorraine). | |
| in 2 and 3 | The first grand quarter having been described, we move to the second, which is identical to the third. These are the arms of the Este family between 1431 and 1452. | |
| counter-quartered | The quarter is divided into four elements by a per fess (a horizontal line) and a per pale (vertical line). | |
| in 1 and 4 azure, an eagle argent, beaked, langued and crowned or | The top left quarter is repeated bottom right. Primitive arms of the House of Este. | |
| and in 2 and 3 azure, three fleurs-de-lis or, a bordure indented gules and or. | The top right quarter is repeated bottom left. Arms of the Duchy of Modena. | |

These quartered arms are classically those of a couple, which can be identified (in the genealogy of the Dukes of Guise) as that formed by Francis, Duke of Guise, known as le Balafré (1519-1563), and Anna d'Este and Ferrara. From this union was born a cadet, Charles, Duke of Mayenne, ancestor of this cadet branch.

== Divisions of the field ==
A shield parted per pale and per fir twig fess

The field of a shield in heraldry can be divided into more than one tincture, as can the various heraldic charges. Many coats of arms consist simply of a division of the field into two contrasting tinctures. These are considered divisions of a shield, so the rule of tincture can be ignored. For example, a shield divided azure and gules would be perfectly acceptable. A line of partition may be straight or it may be varied. The variations of partition lines can be wavy, indented, embattled, engrailed, nebuly, or made into myriad other forms; see Line (heraldry).

== Ordinaries ==
In the early days of heraldry, very simple bold rectilinear shapes were painted on shields. These could be easily recognized at a long distance and could be easily remembered. They therefore served the main purpose of heraldry: identification. As more complicated shields came into use, these bold shapes were set apart in a separate class as the "honorable ordinaries". They act as charges and are always written first in blazon. Unless otherwise specified they extend to the edges of the field. Though ordinaries are not easily defined, they are generally described as including the cross, the fess, the pale, the bend, the chevron, the saltire, and the pall.

There is a separate class of charges called sub-ordinaries which are of a geometrical shape subordinate to the ordinary. According to Friar, they are distinguished by their order in blazon. The sub-ordinaries include the inescutcheon, the orle, the tressure, the double tressure, the bordure, the chief, the canton, the label, and flaunches.

Ordinaries may appear in parallel series, in which case blazons in English give them different names such as pallets, bars, bendlets, and chevronels. French blazon makes no such distinction between these diminutives and the ordinaries when borne singly. Unless otherwise specified an ordinary is drawn with straight lines, but each may be indented, embattled, wavy, engrailed, or otherwise have their lines varied.

== Charges ==
A charge is any object or figure placed on a heraldic shield or on any other object of an armorial composition. Any object found in nature or technology may appear as a heraldic charge in armory. Charges can be animals, objects, or geometric shapes. Apart from the ordinaries, the most frequent charges are the cross – with its hundreds of variations – and the lion and eagle. Other common animals are stags, wild boars, martlets, and fish. Dragons, bats, unicorns, griffins, and more exotic monsters appear as charges and as supporters.

Animals are found in various stereotyped positions or attitudes. Quadrupeds can often be found rampant (standing on the left hind foot). Another frequent position is passant, or walking, like the lions of the coat of arms of England. Eagles are almost always shown with their wings spread, or displayed. A pair of wings conjoined is called a vol.

In English heraldry the crescent, mullet, martlet, annulet, fleur-de-lis, and rose may be added to a shield to distinguish cadet branches of a family from the senior line. These cadency marks are usually shown smaller than normal charges, but it still does not follow that a shield containing such a charge belongs to a cadet branch. All of these charges occur frequently in basic undifferenced coats of arms.

== Marshalling ==
To marshal two or more coats of arms is to combine them in one shield. This can be done in a number of ways, of which the simplest is impalement: dividing the field per pale and putting one whole coat in each half. Impalement replaced the earlier dimidiation – combining the dexter half of one coat with the sinister half of another – because dimidiation can create ambiguity.

A more versatile method is quartering, division of the field by both vertical and horizontal lines. As the name implies, the usual number of divisions is four, but the principle has been extended to very large numbers of "quarters".

The third common mode of marshalling is with an inescutcheon, a small shield placed in front of the main shield.

== Variations of the field ==
The field of a shield, or less often a charge or crest, is sometimes made up of a pattern of colours, or variation. A pattern of horizontal (barwise) stripes, for example, is called barry, while a pattern of vertical (palewise) stripes is called paly. A pattern of diagonal stripes may be called bendy or bendy sinister, depending on the direction of the stripes. Other variations include chevrony, gyronny and chequy. Wave shaped stripes are termed undy. For further variations, these are sometimes combined to produce patterns of barry-bendy, paly-bendy, lozengy and fusilly. Semés, or patterns of repeated charges, are also considered variations of the field. The Rule of tincture applies to all semés and variations of the field.

== Differencing and cadency ==
Cadency is any systematic way to distinguish arms displayed by descendants of the holder of a coat of arms when those family members have not been granted arms in their own right. Cadency is necessary in heraldic systems in which a given design may be owned by only one person at any time, generally the head of the senior line of a particular family. As an armiger's arms may be used "by courtesy", either by children or spouses, while they are still living, some form of differencing may be required so as not to confuse them with the original undifferenced or "plain coat" arms. Historically, arms were only heritable by males and therefore cadency marks had no relevance to daughters; in the modern era, Canadian and Irish heraldry include daughters in cadency. These differences are formed by adding to the arms small and inconspicuous marks called brisures, similar to charges but smaller. They are placed on the fess-point, or in-chief in the case of the label. Brisures are generally exempt from the rule of tincture. One of the best examples of usage from the medieval period is shown on the seven Beauchamp cadets in the stained-glass windows of St Mary's Church, Warwick.

== See also ==
- Glossary of vexillology
