= Château de Châtillon =

Château de Châtillon may refer to:

- Château de Châtillon-Coligny, a castle in Châtillon-Coligny, Loiret, France
- Château de Châtillon-d'Azergues, a castle in Châtillon, Rhône, France
- Château de Châtillon-sur-Chalaronne, a castle in Châtillon-sur-Chalaronne, Ain, France
