= Ambérieux =

Ambérieu or Ambérieux is the name or part of the name of several communes in France:

- Ambérieu-en-Bugey, in the Ain département
- Ambérieux, in the Rhône département
- Ambérieux-en-Dombes, in the Ain département
