= Serlin =

Serlin may refer to:

- Serlin Spur, Marie Byrd Land, Antarctica
- Edward Serlin House, a house in Pleasantville, New York, United States

== Persons with the surname Serlin ==
- Joey Serlin (born 1970), Canadian rock guitarist and songwriter
- Joseph Serlin (1868-1944), French politician
- Oscar Serlin (1901-1971), American Broadway producer
- Yosef Serlin (1906-1974), Israeli politician
