= Belmont-d'Azergues =

- Commune
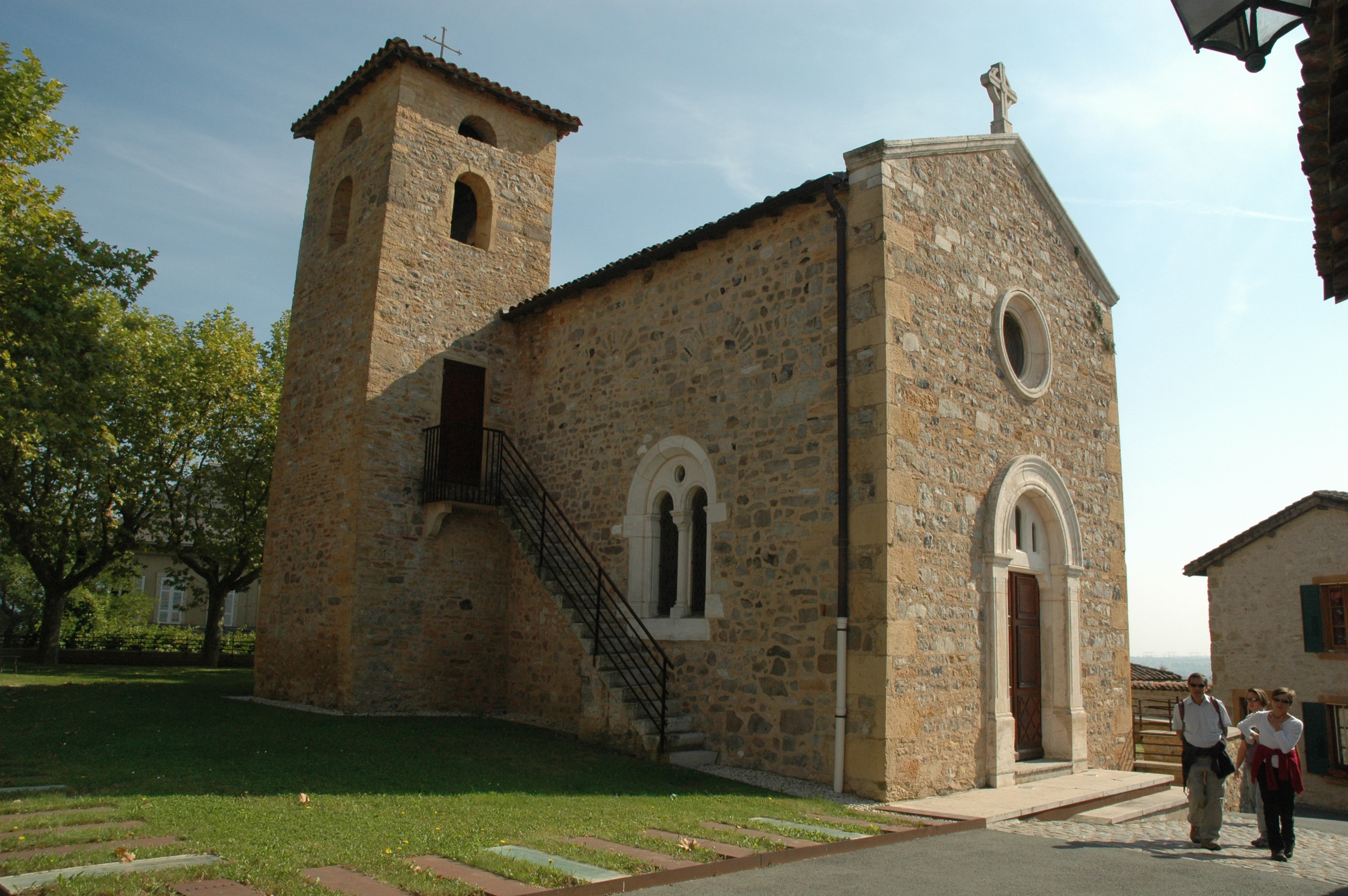
- The church of Saint-Julien, in Belmont-d'Azergues
- Location of Belmont-d'Azergues
- Location within France Location within Auvergne-Rhône-Alpes
- Coordinates: 45°52′08″N 4°40′13″E
- Country: France
- Region: Auvergne-Rhône-Alpes
- Department: Rhône
- Arrondissement: Villefranche-sur-Saône
- Canton: Val d'Oingt

Government
  - Mayor (2020–2026): Jean-Luc Tricot
- Area^{1}: 1.51 km^{2} (0.58 sq mi)
- Elevation: 300 m (980 ft)
- Population (2023): 720
  - Density: 480/km^{2} (1,200/sq mi)
- Time zone: UTC+01:00 (CET)
  - Summer (DST): UTC+02:00 (CEST)
- INSEE/Postal code: 69020 /69380
- ^{1} French Land Register data, which excludes lakes, ponds, glaciers > 1 km^{2} (0.386 sq mi or 247 acres) and river estuaries.

Belmont-d'Azergues (French pronunciation: [bɛlmɔ̃ dazɛʁɡ], literally Belmont of Azergues, before 1998: Belmont) is a commune of the Rhône department in eastern France.

== See also ==
- Communes of the Rhône department
