= Marcy, Rhône =

Marcy
- Commune
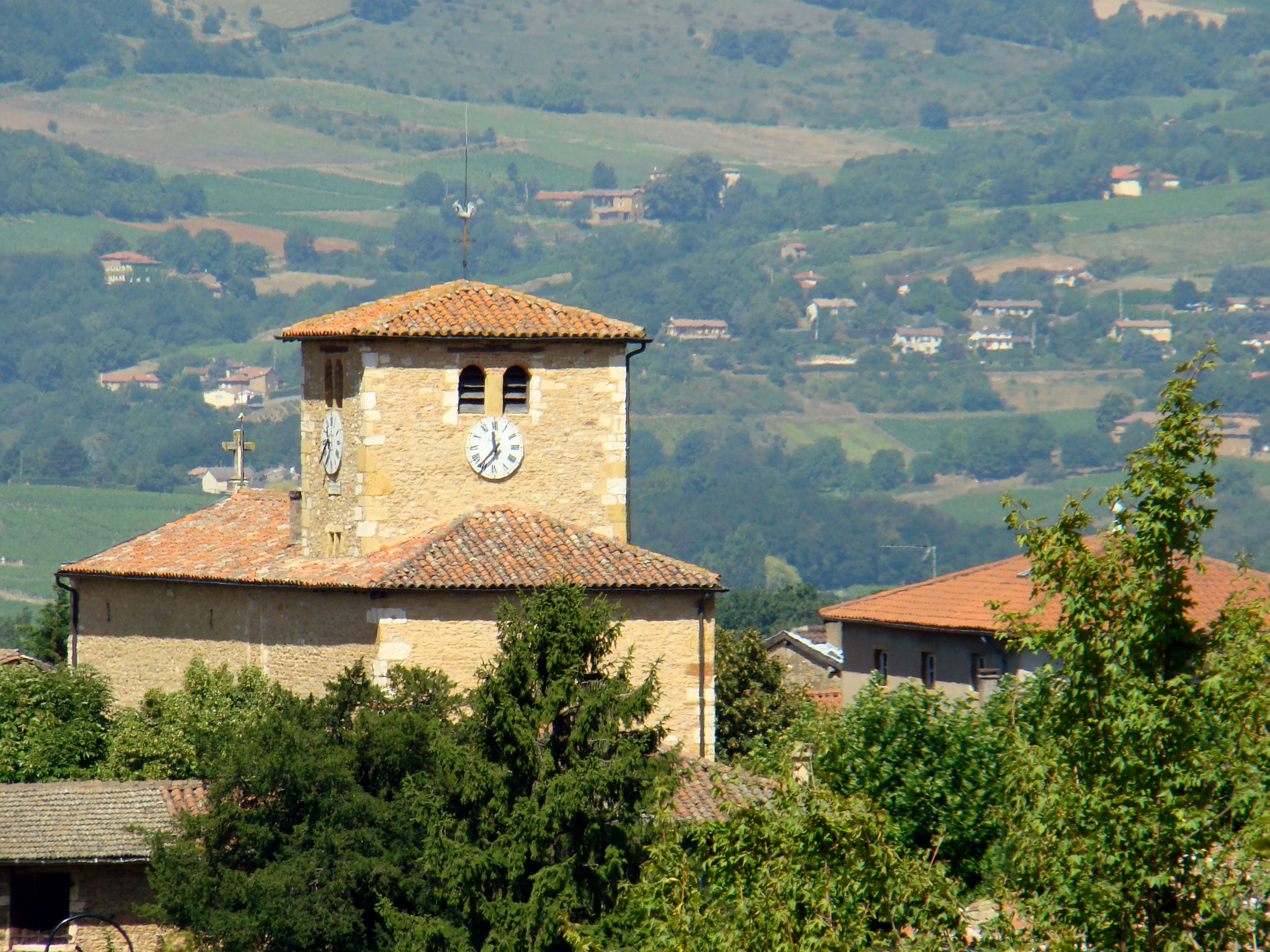
- The church in Marcy

- Coat of arms
- Location of Marcy
- Location within France Location within Auvergne-Rhône-Alpes
- Coordinates: 45°55′01″N 4°40′59″E
- Country: France
- Region: Auvergne-Rhône-Alpes
- Department: Rhône
- Arrondissement: Villefranche-sur-Saône
- Canton: Anse
- Intercommunality: Beaujolais-Pierres-Dorées

Government
  - Mayor (2020–2026): Philippe Soler
- Area^{1}: 3.33 km^{2} (1.29 sq mi)
- Elevation: 400 m (1,300 ft)
- Highest elevation: 409 m (1,342 ft)
- Lowest elevation: 300 m (980 ft)
- Population (2023): 916
  - Density: 275/km^{2} (712/sq mi)
- Time zone: UTC+01:00 (CET)
  - Summer (DST): UTC+02:00 (CEST)
- INSEE/Postal code: 69126 /69480
- ^{1} French Land Register data, which excludes lakes, ponds, glaciers > 1 km^{2} (0.386 sq mi or 247 acres) and river estuaries.

Marcy (French pronunciation: [maʁsi]) is a commune in the Rhône department in eastern France.

== See also ==
- Communes of the Rhône department
