= Ambérieux, Rhône =

Ambérieux
- Commune
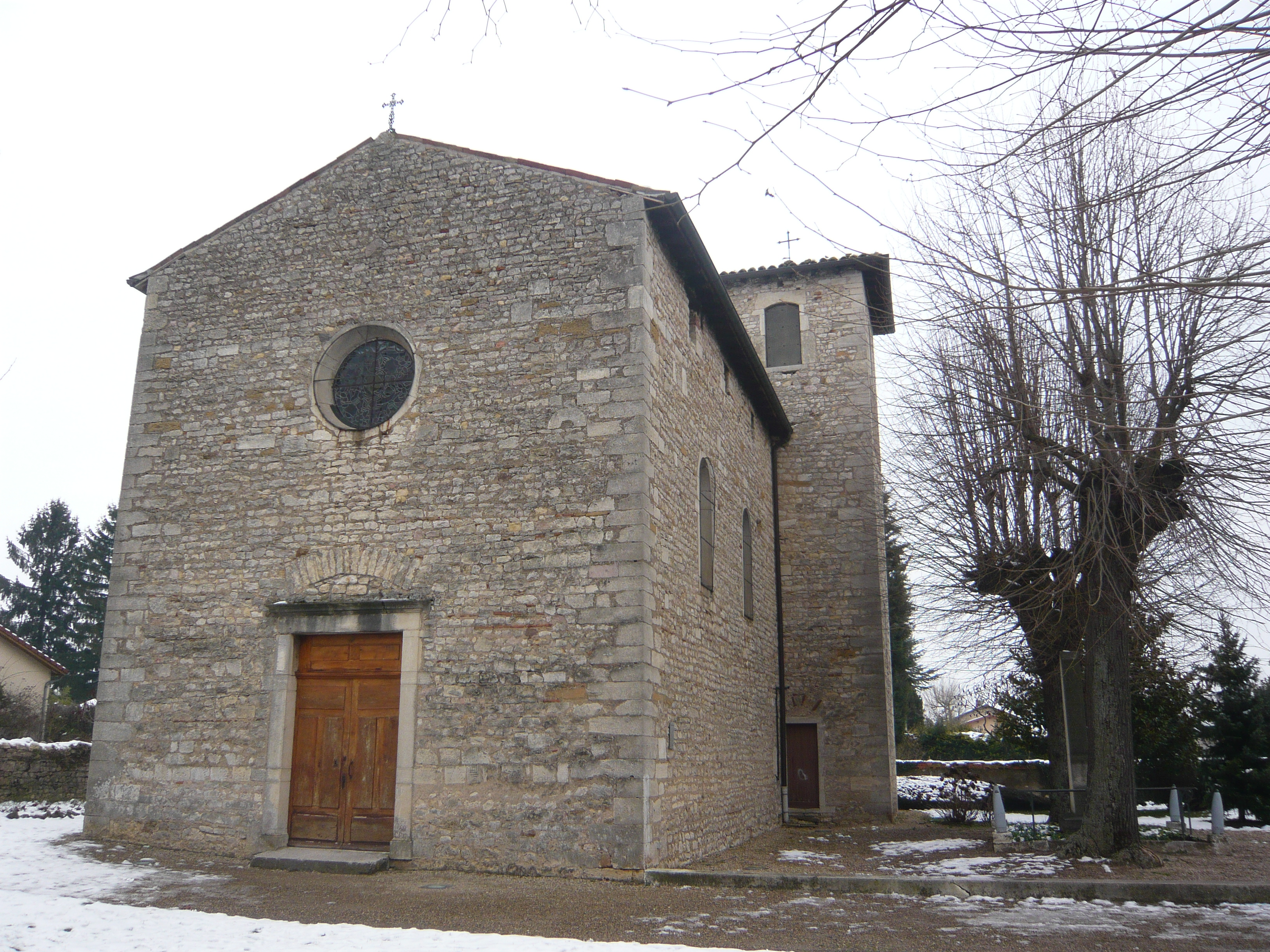
- The church in Ambérieux
- Location of Ambérieux
- Location within France Location within Auvergne-Rhône-Alpes
- Coordinates: 45°55′41″N 4°44′06″E
- Country: France
- Region: Auvergne-Rhône-Alpes
- Department: Rhône
- Arrondissement: Villefranche-sur-Saône
- Canton: Anse
- Intercommunality: Beaujolais-Pierres-Dorées

Government
  - Mayor (2020–2026): Nathalie Faye
- Area^{1}: 4.55 km^{2} (1.76 sq mi)
- Elevation: 176 m (577 ft)
- Highest elevation: 176 m (577 ft)
- Lowest elevation: 167 m (548 ft)
- Population (2023): 651
  - Density: 143/km^{2} (371/sq mi)
- Time zone: UTC+01:00 (CET)
  - Summer (DST): UTC+02:00 (CEST)
- INSEE/Postal code: 69005 /69480
- ^{1} French Land Register data, which excludes lakes, ponds, glaciers > 1 km^{2} (0.386 sq mi or 247 acres) and river estuaries.

Ambérieux, also known as Ambérieux-d'Azergues (French pronunciation: [ɑ̃beʁjø dazɛʁɡ]), is a commune in the Rhône department and the region of Auvergne-Rhône-Alpes, eastern France.

== See also ==
- Communes of the Rhône department
- Azergues
