= Pommiers, Rhône =

Pommiers
- Commune
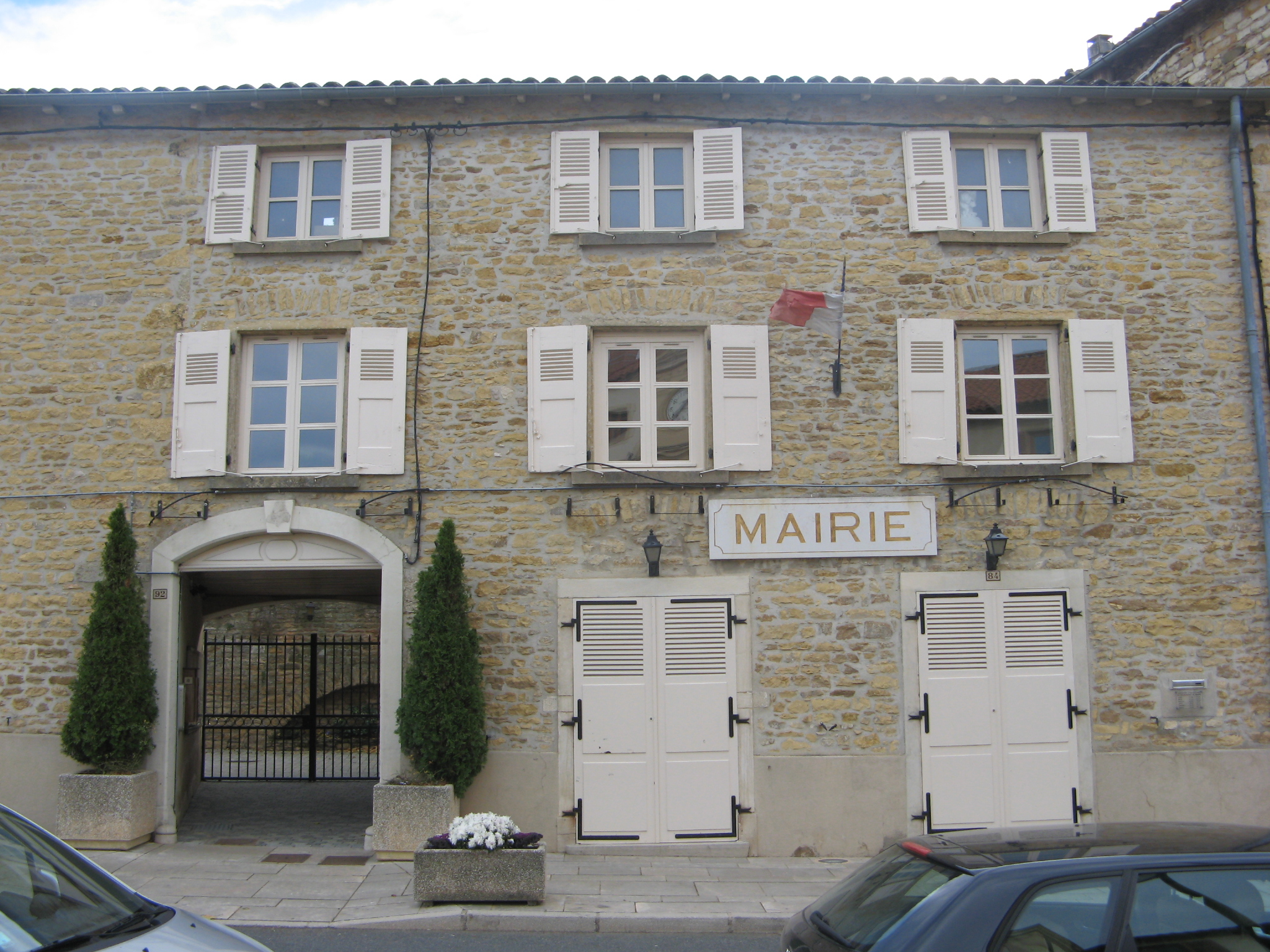
- The town hall in Pommiers

- Coat of arms
- Location of Pommiers
- Location within France Location within Auvergne-Rhône-Alpes
- Coordinates: 45°57′00″N 4°40′59″E
- Country: France
- Region: Auvergne-Rhône-Alpes
- Department: Rhône
- Arrondissement: Villefranche-sur-Saône
- Canton: Anse
- Intercommunality: Beaujolais-Pierres-Dorées

Government
  - Mayor (2020–2026): René Blanchet
- Area^{1}: 7.76 km^{2} (3.00 sq mi)
- Elevation: 357 m (1,171 ft)
- Highest elevation: 352 m (1,155 ft)
- Lowest elevation: 169 m (554 ft)
- Population (2023): 2,618
  - Density: 337/km^{2} (874/sq mi)
- Time zone: UTC+01:00 (CET)
  - Summer (DST): UTC+02:00 (CEST)
- INSEE/Postal code: 69156 /69480
- ^{1} French Land Register data, which excludes lakes, ponds, glaciers > 1 km^{2} (0.386 sq mi or 247 acres) and river estuaries.

Pommiers (French pronunciation: [pɔmje]) is a commune in the Rhône department in eastern France.

== Population ==
Historical population
Year	Pop.	±% p.a.
1968	1,040	—
1975	1,196	+2.02%
1982	1,443	+2.72%
1990	1,619	+1.45%
1999	1,804	+1.21%
2007	2,149	+2.21%
2012	2,311	+1.46%
2017	2,637	+2.67%
2023	2,618	−0.12%
Source: INSEE

== See also ==
- Communes of the Rhône department
