= Canton of Anse =

Coordinates: 45.92°N 4.71°E

Anse
- Canton
- Country: France
- Region: Auvergne-Rhône-Alpes
- Department: Rhône
- No. of communes: {{{nbcomm}}}
- Area: 114.41 km^{2} (44.17 sq mi)
- Population (2023): 42,173
  - Density: 368.61/km^{2} (954.70/sq mi)
- INSEE code: 6901

The Canton of Anse is a French administrative division, located in the Rhône department.

The canton was modified by decree of 27 February 2014 which came into force in March 2015.

== Composition ==
The canton of Anse is composed of 15 communes:

Communes	Population (2012)
Ambérieux	552
Anse	6,450
Chasselay	2,687
Chazay-d'Azergues	3,943
Civrieux-d'Azergues	1,512
Dommartin	2,671
Lachassagne	953
Lentilly	5,317
Les Chères	1,430
Lozanne	2,483
Lucenay	1,844
Marcilly-d'Azergues	872
Marcy	617
Morancé	2,104
Pommiers	2,311

== See also ==
- Cantons of the Rhône department
- Communes of the Rhône department
