= Lucenay =

- Commune
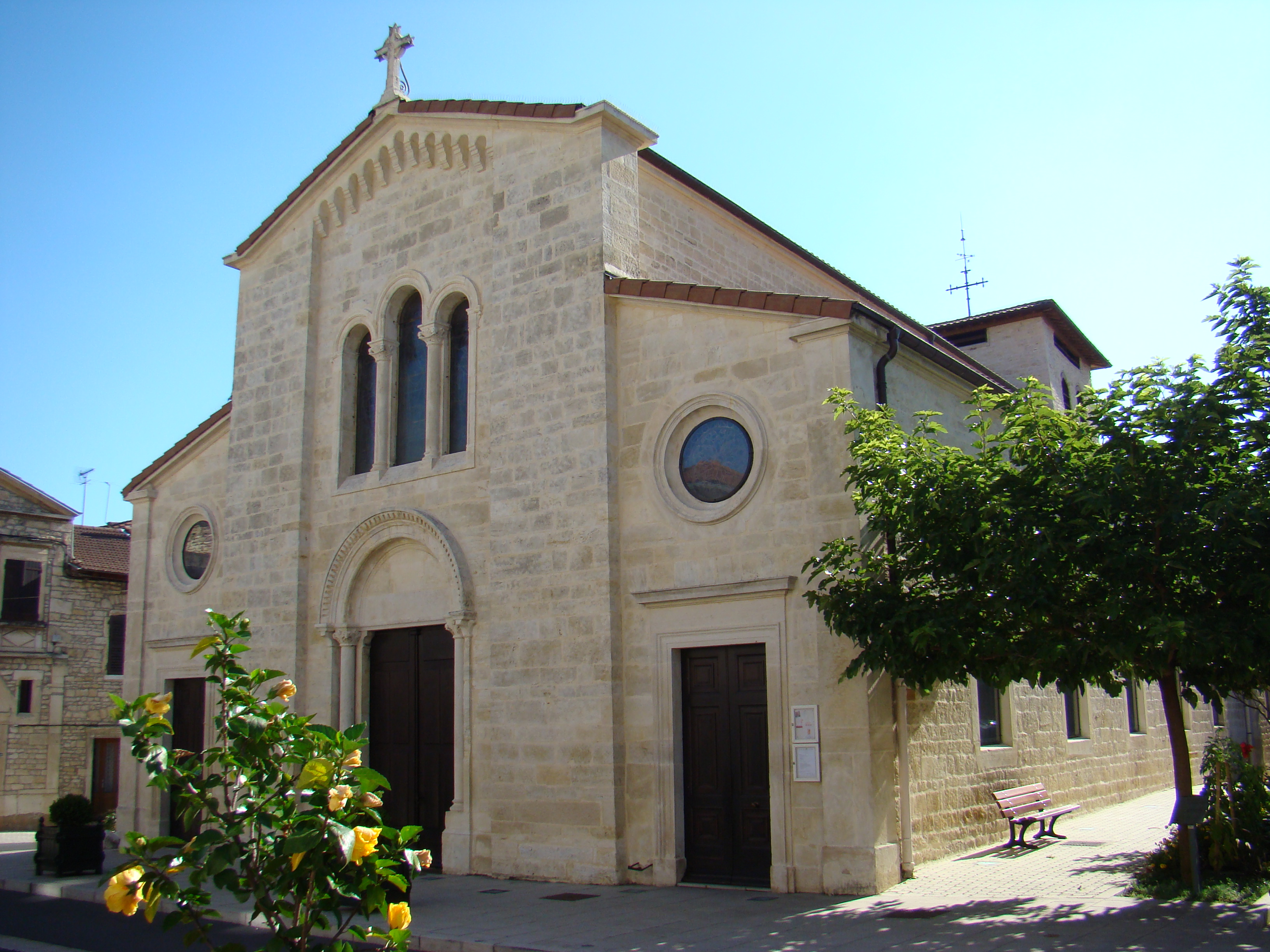
- The church in Lucenay

- Coat of arms
- Location of Lucenay
- Location within France Location within Auvergne-Rhône-Alpes
- Coordinates: 45°55′01″N 4°42′00″E
- Country: France
- Region: Auvergne-Rhône-Alpes
- Department: Rhône
- Arrondissement: Villefranche-sur-Saône
- Canton: Anse
- Intercommunality: Beaujolais-Pierres-Dorées

Government
  - Mayor (2020–2026): Valérie Dugelay
- Area^{1}: 6.27 km^{2} (2.42 sq mi)
- Elevation: 200 m (660 ft)
- Highest elevation: 360 m (1,180 ft)
- Lowest elevation: 173 m (568 ft)
- Population (2023): 2,070
  - Density: 330/km^{2} (855/sq mi)
- Time zone: UTC+01:00 (CET)
  - Summer (DST): UTC+02:00 (CEST)
- INSEE/Postal code: 69122 /69480
- ^{1} French Land Register data, which excludes lakes, ponds, glaciers > 1 km^{2} (0.386 sq mi or 247 acres) and river estuaries.

Lucenay (French pronunciation: [lysnɛ]) is a commune in the Rhône department in eastern France.

== Population ==
Historical population
| Year | Pop. | ±% p.a. |
|---|---|---|
| 1968 | 719 | — |
| 1975 | 878 | +2.90% |
| 1982 | 1,071 | +2.88% |
| 1990 | 1,205 | +1.48% |
| 1999 | 1,368 | +1.42% |
| 2007 | 1,581 | +1.83% |
| 2012 | 1,844 | +3.13% |
| 2017 | 1,808 | −0.39% |
| 2023 | 2,070 | +2.28% |
Source: INSEE

== See also ==
- Communes of the Rhône department
