= Civrieux-d'Azergues =

- Commune
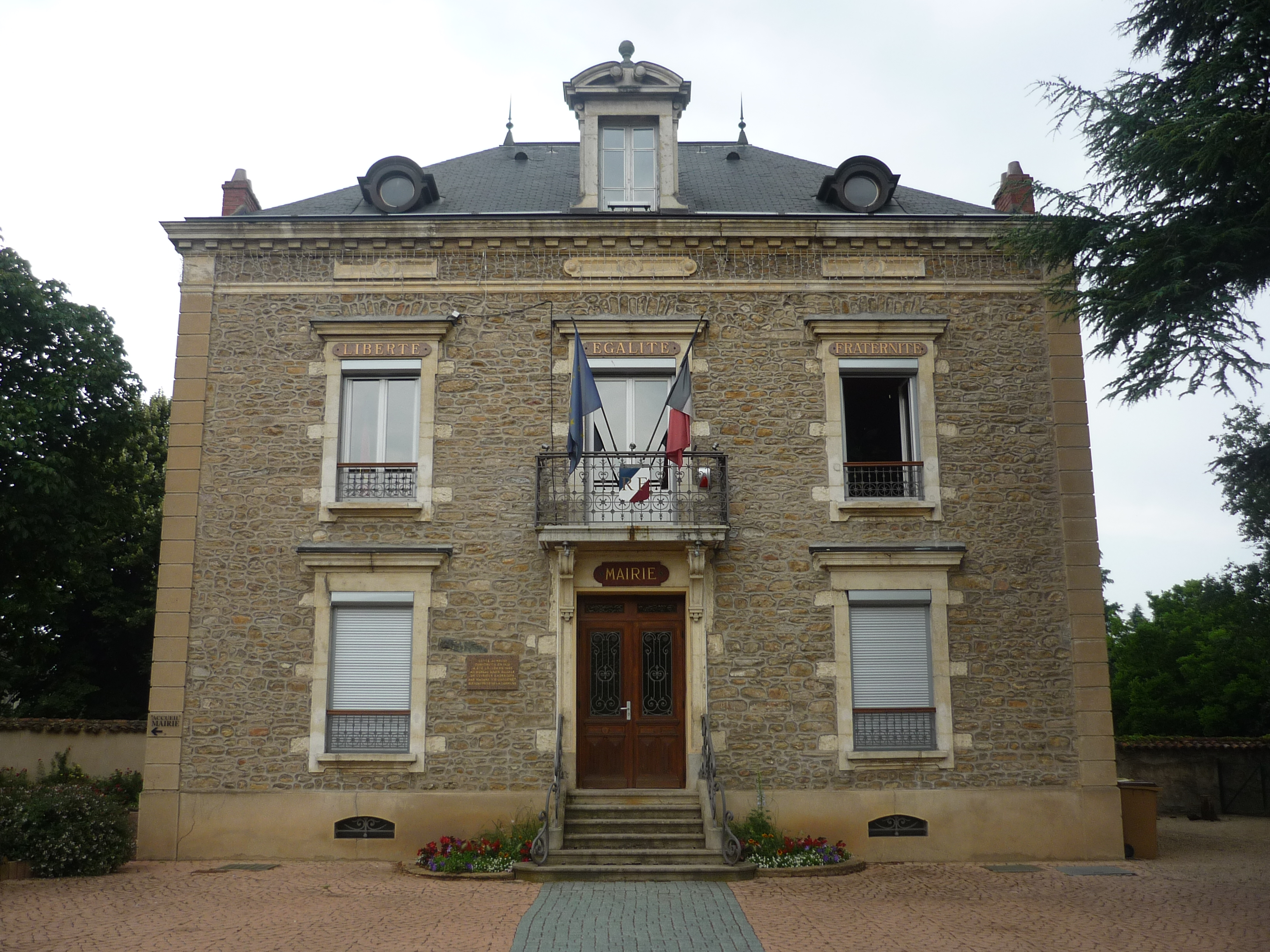
- The town hall in Civrieux d'Azergues

- Coat of arms
- Location of Civrieux-d'Azergues
- Location within France Location within Auvergne-Rhône-Alpes
- Coordinates: 45°51′32″N 4°42′50″E
- Country: France
- Region: Auvergne-Rhône-Alpes
- Department: Rhône
- Arrondissement: Villefranche-sur-Saône
- Canton: Anse
- Intercommunality: Beaujolais-Pierres Dorées

Government
  - Mayor (2020–2026): Marie-Pierre Teyssier
- Area^{1}: 5.02 km^{2} (1.94 sq mi)
- Elevation: 189 m (620 ft)
- Highest elevation: 303 m (994 ft)
- Lowest elevation: 189 m (620 ft)
- Population (2023): 1,675
  - Density: 334/km^{2} (864/sq mi)
- Time zone: UTC+01:00 (CET)
  - Summer (DST): UTC+02:00 (CEST)
- INSEE/Postal code: 69059 /69380
- ^{1} French Land Register data, which excludes lakes, ponds, glaciers > 1 km^{2} (0.386 sq mi or 247 acres) and river estuaries.

Civrieux-d'Azergues (French pronunciation: [sivʁijø dazɛʁɡ], literally Civrieux of Azergues) is a commune in the Rhône department in eastern France.

== See also ==
- Communes of the Rhône department
