= Château de Châtillon-d'Azergues =

Castle ruins in France

Coordinates: 45°52′44″N 4°38′43″E

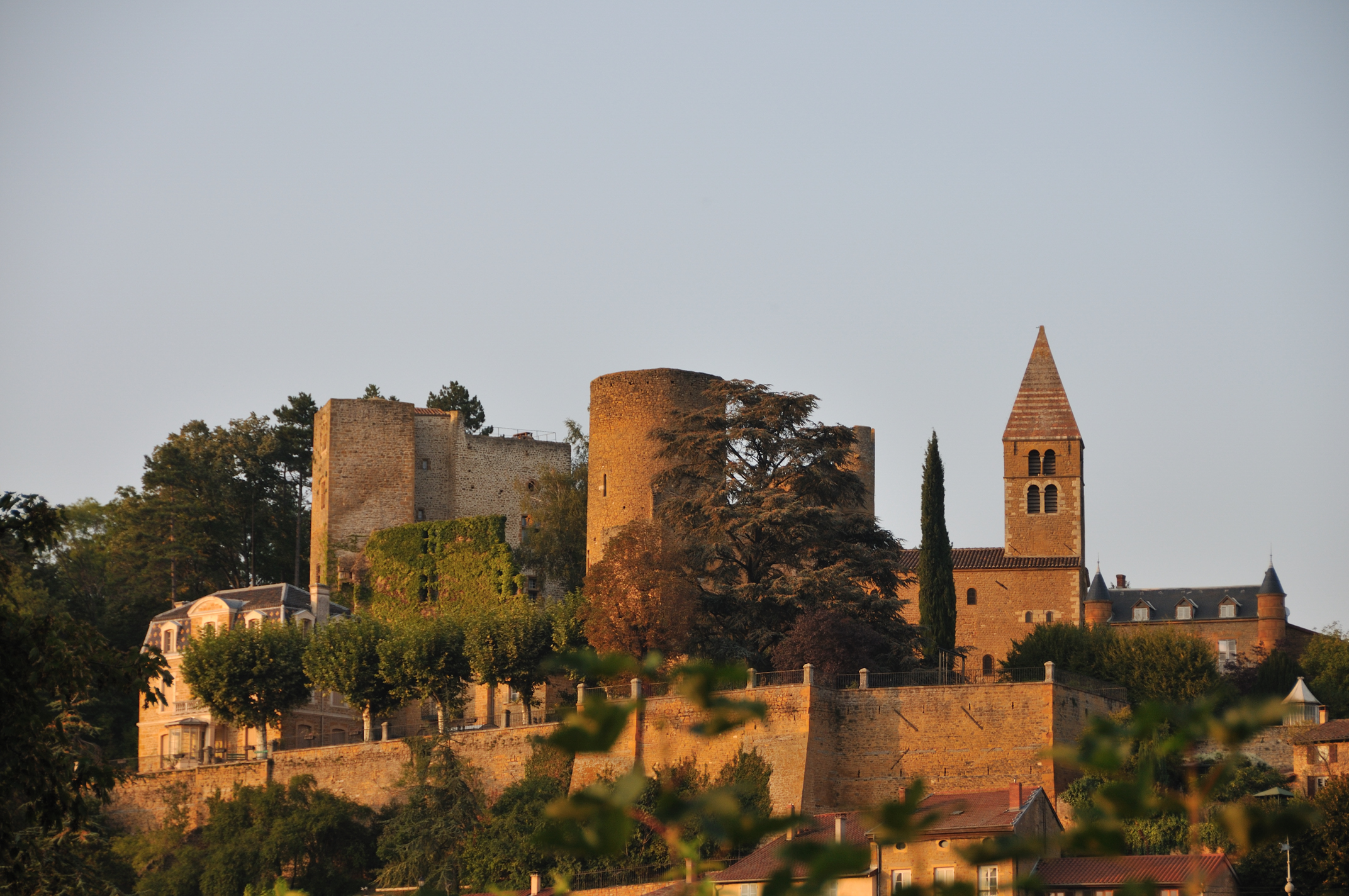
General view

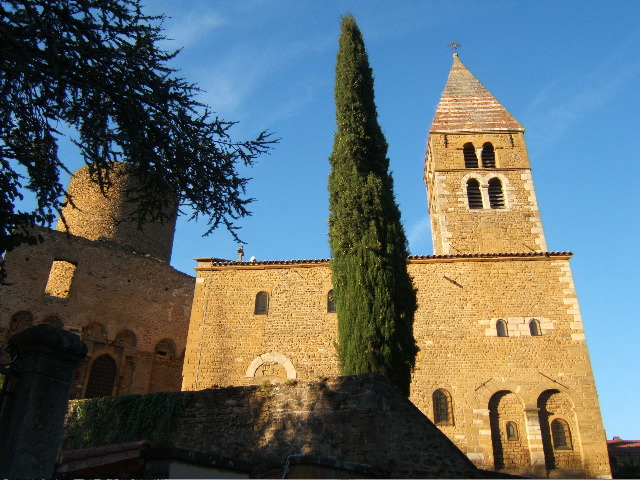
The chapel and castle

The Château de Châtillon-d'Azergues is a ruined castle in the commune of Châtillon (formerly Châtillon-d'Azergues) in the Rhône département of France.

The castle's construction is dated to the 13th and 15th centuries. All that remains of the castle is the keep and a tower. The 12th century Chapel of Saint-Barthélémy, known as Notre-Dame-de-Bon-Secours, is at the side of the castle.

== History ==
A Châtillon family was recorded from the end of the 10th or the 11th centuries. In 1173, the castle was the property of the Count of Forez, who ceded it to the Archbishop of Lyon. During the 13th century, the Oingt family had possession before it passed by marriage to the Albons. In 1260, the keep was mentioned in an act which stipulated that "les habitants de Châtillon sont tenus à travailler aux réparations du château, mais rien ne peut leur être imposé pour le donjon qui sert exclusivement de retraite au seigneur" ("the inhabitants of Châtillon are required to work on repairs of the castle, but nothing can be imposed on them for the keep which is used exclusively as retirement for the lord").

== Description ==
The site consists of a polygonal enceinte with several buildings from the 13th to 16th centuries. In the centre of the enceinte is the 13th century cylindrical keep. It is 30 m high and 9.5 m in diameter with walls 1.5 m thick. Only the ground floor was vaulted. During the 15th century, a hexagonal staircase towers was attached which asloserved the other buildings. The oldest part of the castle is a 12th-century rectangular building supported by very flat buttresses, connected to each other by blind arcades forming a decoration known as a frise lombarde (Lombardy frieze).

The 12th century Saint-Barthélémy chapel, known as Notre-Dame-de-Bon-Secours, situated to the east of the castle, was the original castle chapel.

The castle is privately owned and closed to the public. The chapel was listed in 1862 as a monument historique by the French Ministry of Culture; the castle itself has been listed since 1937.

== See also ==
- List of castles in France
