= Château de Châtillon-sur-Chalaronne =

Ruined castle in the Ain département of France

Coordinates: 46.117°N 4.955°E

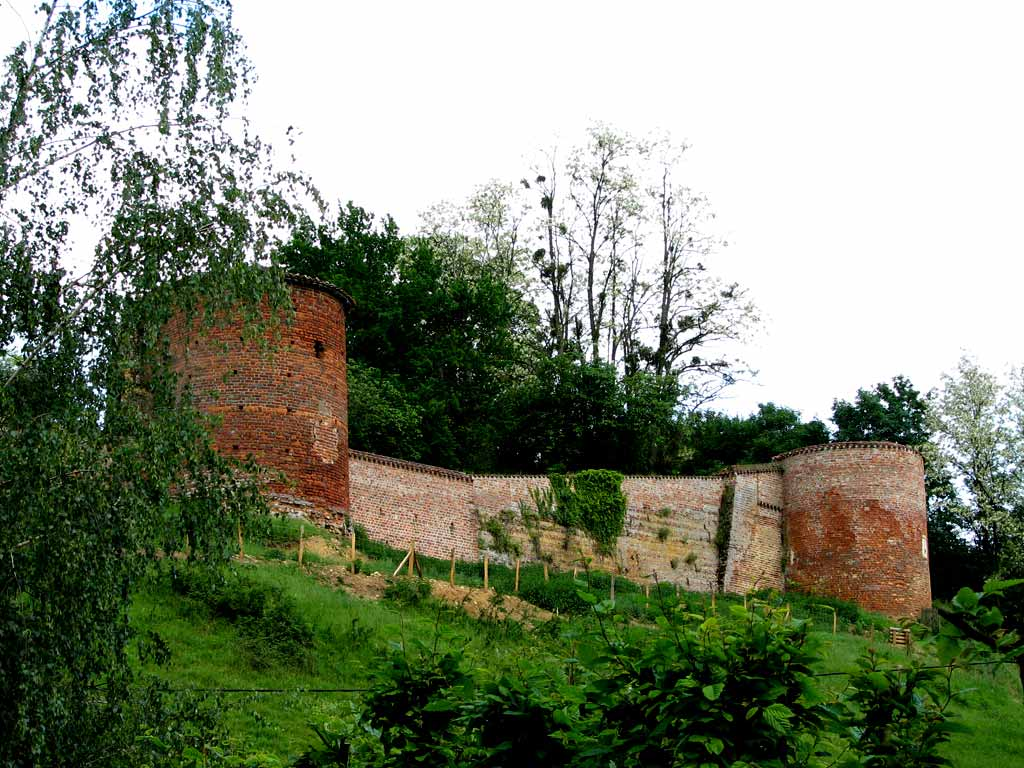
The Château de Châtillon-sur-Chalaronne

The Château de Châtillon-sur-Chalaronne is a ruined castle in the commune of Châtillon-sur-Chalaronne in the Ain département of France.

== History ==
Constructed by the seigneurs of Châtillon around 1000, it was the birthplace, around 1155, of Saint Étienne de Châtillon, the future Carthusian monk and Bishop of Die. It fell in 1272 to the counts of Savoie who found a considerable strategic interest it. Moreover, the size of the buildings allowed them to hold receptions there.

In 1600, Henri IV declared war on Duchy of Savoy. Bresse was invaded and the castle was razed. All that was left was the enceinte with its entrance gateway with its ogival arch and the foundations of four of the original seven towers.

== Description ==
A large work of rehabilitation made it possible to raise the four towers and to make safe the site, which offers an exceptional view today when one arrives by the D936 road. (Bourg-en-Bresse - Villefranche-sur-Saône). Visitors can rest on the lawn created inside this enclosure, or attend one of the many historical shows which are put on there in summer. In order to benefit further from this site, the commune undertook work and is forming a pedestrian path around the old castle.

The property of the commune, it has been listed since 1927 as a monument historique by the French Ministry of Culture.

== See also ==
- List of castles in France
