= Lentilly =

- Commune
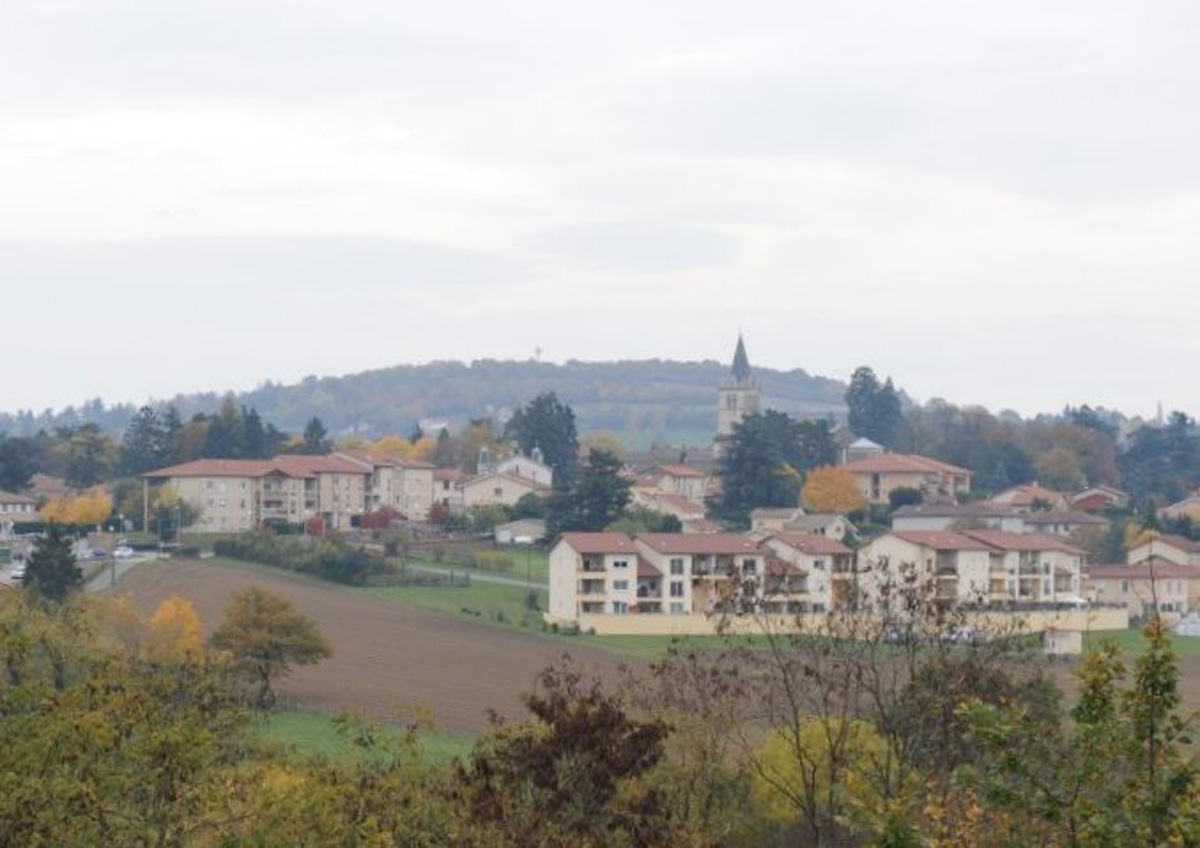
- A view of Lentilly, from Napoleon road

- Coat of arms
- Location of Lentilly
- Location within France Location within Auvergne-Rhône-Alpes
- Coordinates: 45°49′11″N 4°39′49″E
- Country: France
- Region: Auvergne-Rhône-Alpes
- Department: Rhône
- Arrondissement: Villefranche-sur-Saône
- Canton: Anse
- Intercommunality: Pays de L'Arbresle

Government
  - Mayor (2020–2026): Nathalie Sorin
- Area^{1}: 18.39 km^{2} (7.10 sq mi)
- Elevation: 250 m (820 ft)
- Highest elevation: 565 m (1,854 ft)
- Lowest elevation: 240 m (790 ft)
- Population (2023): 6,623
  - Density: 360.1/km^{2} (932.8/sq mi)
- Time zone: UTC+01:00 (CET)
  - Summer (DST): UTC+02:00 (CEST)
- INSEE/Postal code: 69112 /69210
- ^{1} French Land Register data, which excludes lakes, ponds, glaciers > 1 km^{2} (0.386 sq mi or 247 acres) and river estuaries.

Lentilly (French pronunciation: [lɑ̃tiji]) is a commune in the Rhône department in eastern France.

== Population ==
Historical population
Year	Pop.	±% p.a.
1968	1,434	—
1975	2,113	+5.69%
1982	2,537	+2.65%
1990	3,819	+5.25%
1999	4,719	+2.38%
2007	5,174	+1.16%
2012	5,317	+0.55%
2017	5,793	+1.73%
2023	6,623	+2.26%
Source: INSEE

== See also ==
- Communes of the Rhône department
