= Joseph Serlin =

French politician

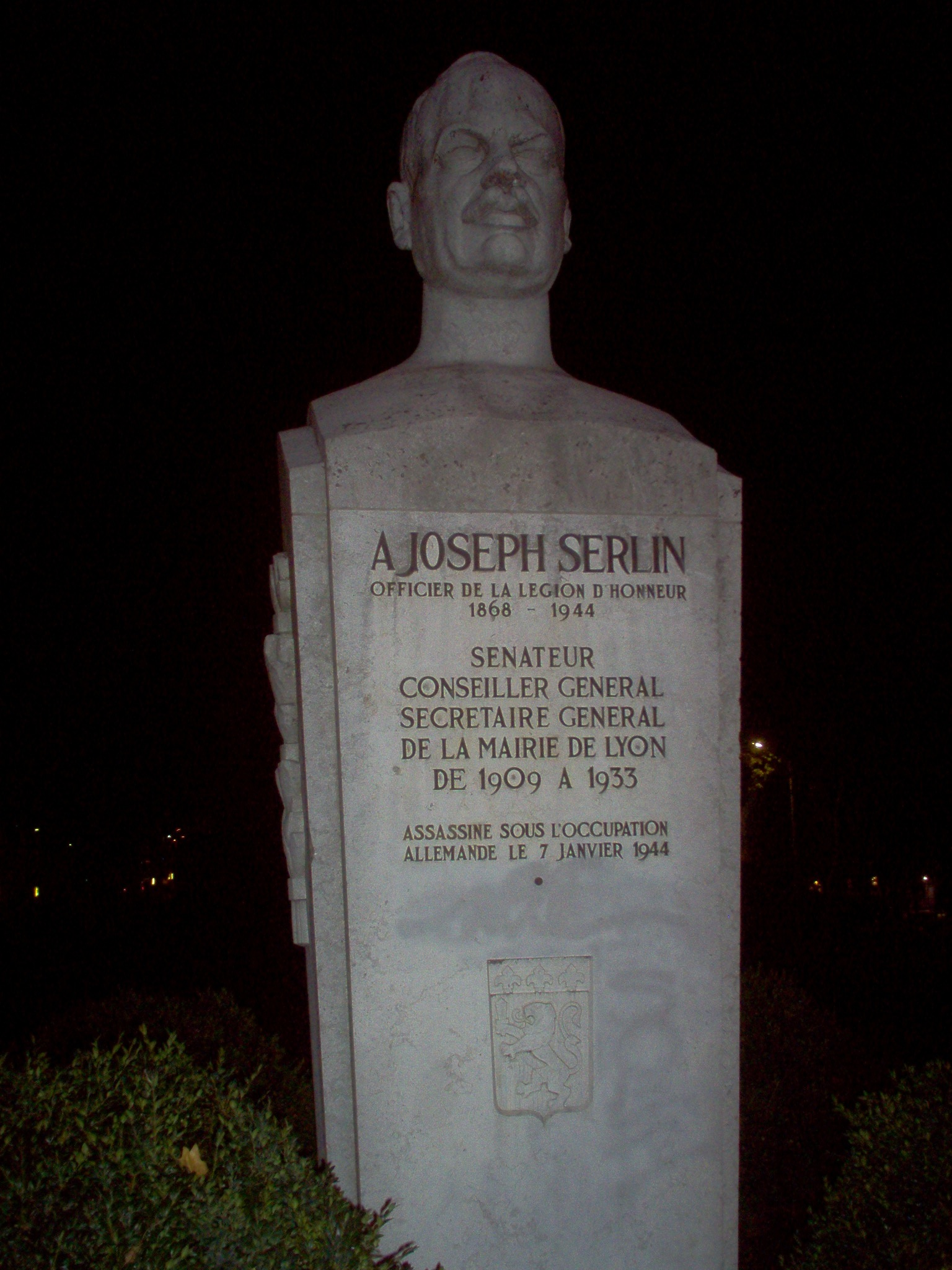
- Commemorative statue of Joseph Serlin in Lyon
- Born: 11 October 1868; Crachier, Isère, France
- Died: 7 January 1944 (aged 75); Dommartin, Rhône, France
- Occupation: Politician

Joseph Serlin (1868-1944) was a French politician. He served as a member of the French Senate from 1933 to 1941, representing Isère. He was assassinated by pro-German forces for his ties to the French Resistance.
