= Chazay-d'Azergues =

- Commune
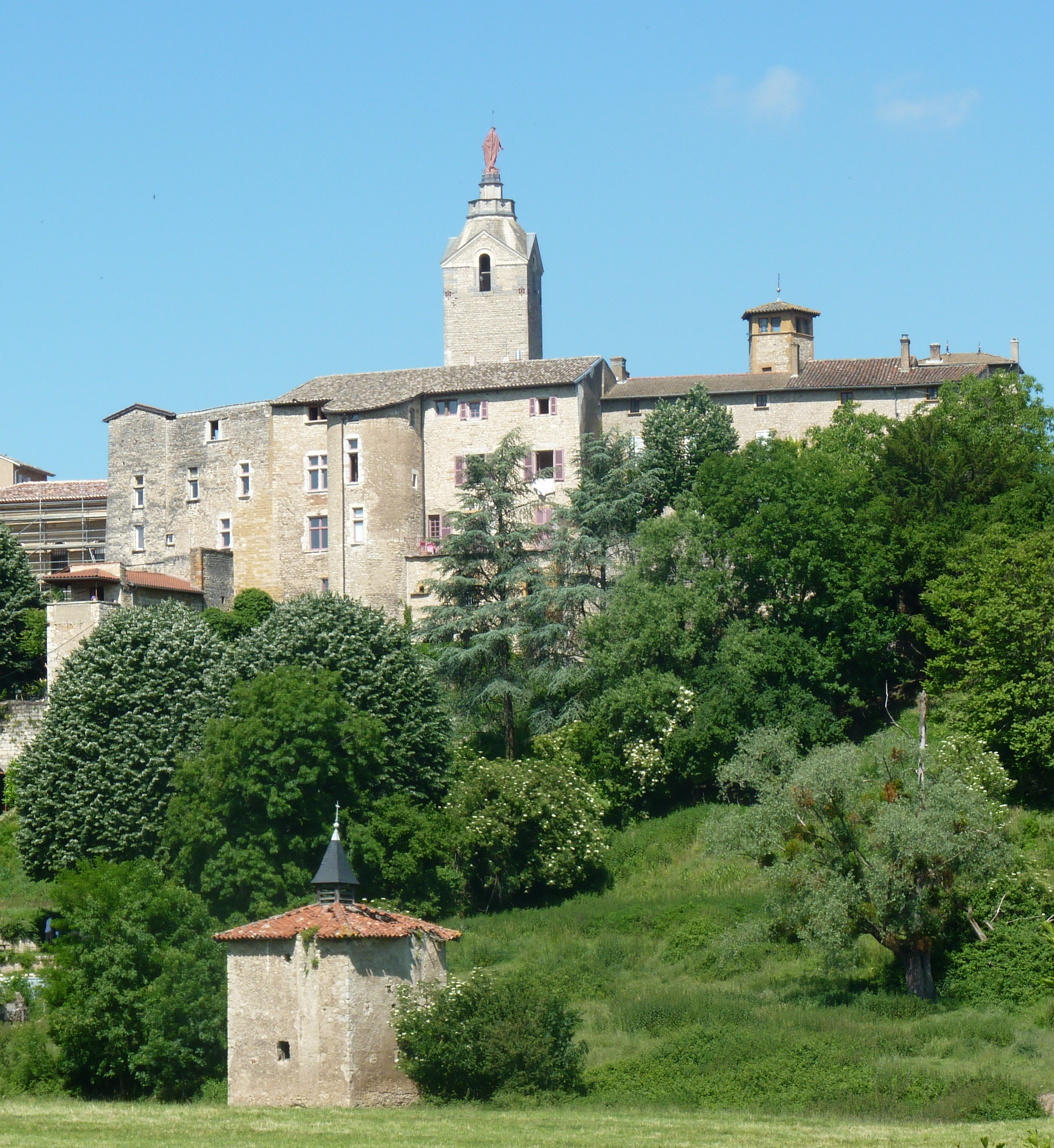
- A view of the citadel of Chazay-d'Azergues

- Coat of arms
- Location of Chazay-d'Azergues
- Location within France Location within Auvergne-Rhône-Alpes
- Coordinates: 45°52′01″N 4°43′01″E
- Country: France
- Region: Auvergne-Rhône-Alpes
- Department: Rhône
- Arrondissement: Villefranche-sur-Saône
- Canton: Anse
- Intercommunality: CC Beaujolais Pierres Dorées

Government
  - Mayor (2020–2026): Pascale Bay
- Area^{1}: 5.94 km^{2} (2.29 sq mi)
- Elevation: 210 m (690 ft)
- Highest elevation: 311 m (1,020 ft)
- Lowest elevation: 179 m (587 ft)
- Population (2023): 4,410
  - Density: 742/km^{2} (1,920/sq mi)
- Time zone: UTC+01:00 (CET)
  - Summer (DST): UTC+02:00 (CEST)
- INSEE/Postal code: 69052 /69380
- Website: www.chazaydazergues.fr
- ^{1} French Land Register data, which excludes lakes, ponds, glaciers > 1 km^{2} (0.386 sq mi or 247 acres) and river estuaries.

Chazay-d'Azergues (French pronunciation: [ʃazɛ dazɛʁɡ], literally Chazay of Azergues, before 1962: Chazay) is a commune in the Rhône department in eastern France.

== Population ==
Historical population
Year	Pop.	±% p.a.
1968	1,479	—
1975	2,054	+4.80%
1982	2,712	+4.05%
1990	3,314	+2.54%
1999	3,903	+1.83%
2007	3,906	+0.01%
2012	3,943	+0.19%
2017	4,130	+0.93%
2023	4,410	+1.10%
Source: INSEE

== See also ==
Communes of the Rhône department
