= John Edwin Cussans =

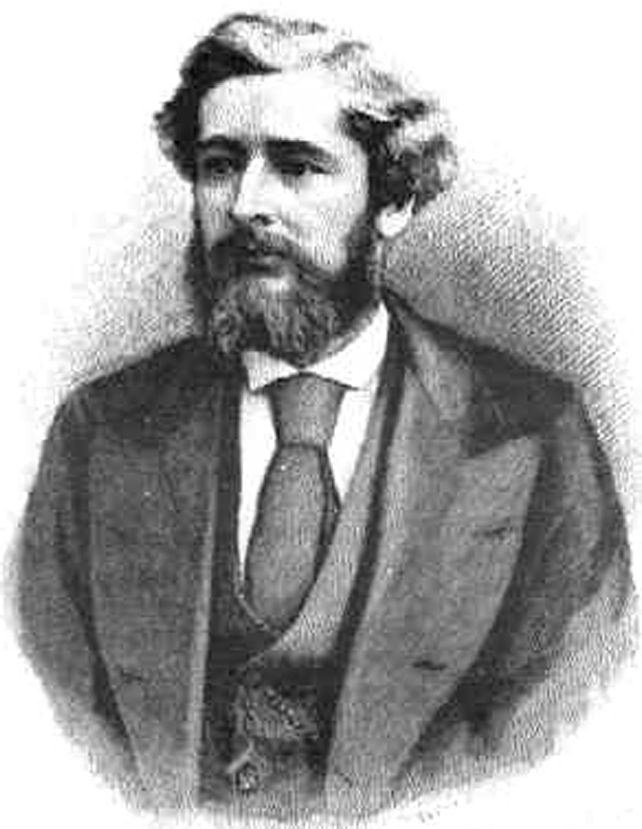
John Edwin Cussans

John Edwin Cussans (1837–1899) was an English antiquary.

== Life ==
Cussans was born in Plymouth 30 October 1837, the fifth child of Thomas Cussans, who had been a lieutenant in the Madras Horse Artillery, by his wife Matilda Ann (née Goodman). After education at North Hill School, Plymouth, he entered a commercial house, and he visited America (1858) and Russia (1861) on business.

After his marriage in 1863 he took up writing, working on heraldic and genealogical studies, living in north London. The preface of his History of Hertfordshire was dated from 4 Wyndham Crescent, Junction Road, London, on Christmas Day 1880. Cussans subsequently moved to 46 St. John's Park, Upper Holloway, where he died on 11 September 1899 and was buried in Highgate Cemetery. From 1881 to 1897 Cussans had been secretary of the Anglo-Californian Bank in Austin Friars. He married, on 10 March 1863, Emma Prior, second surviving daughter of John Ward of Hackney, by whom he left eight children.

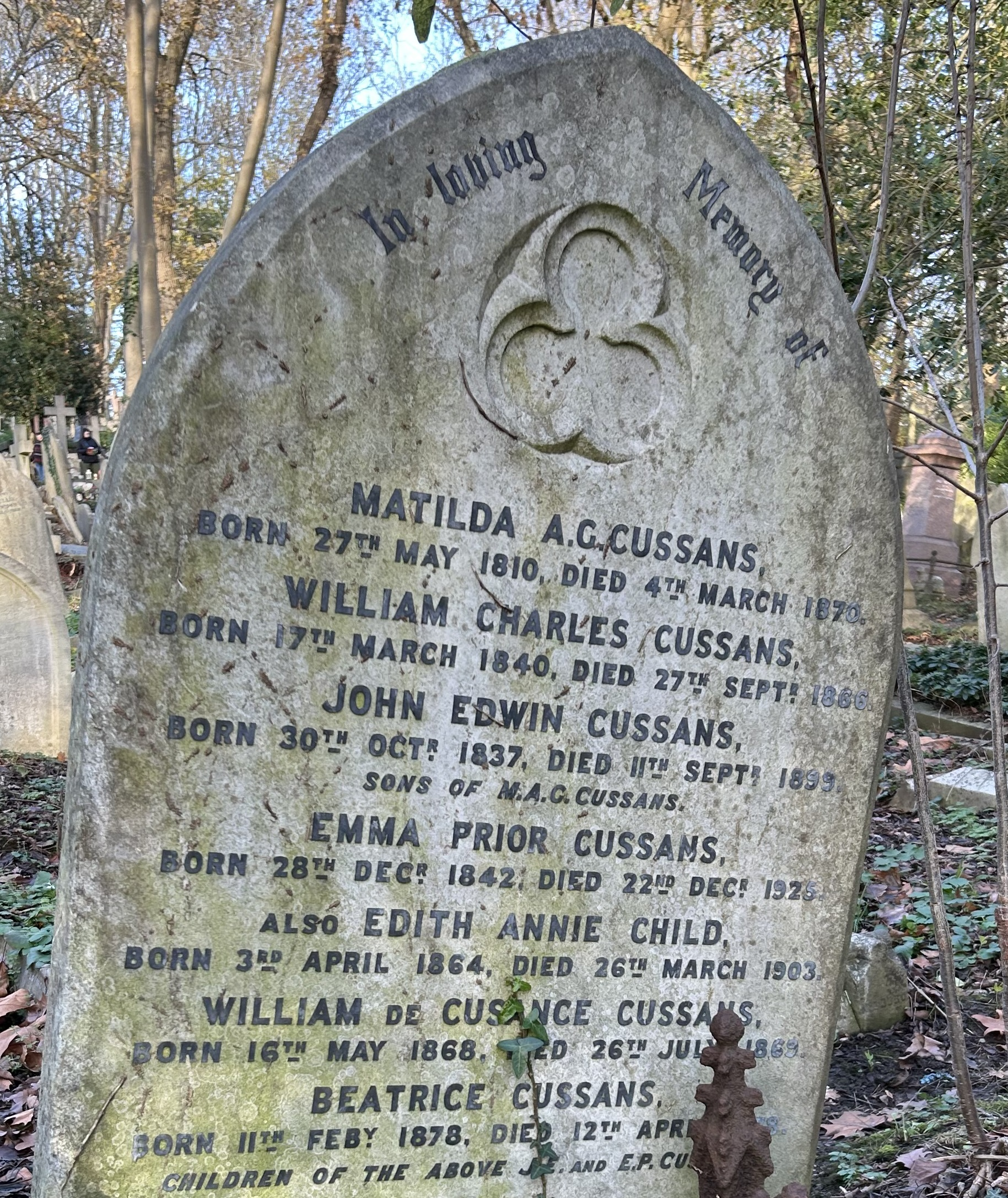
Grave of John Edwin Cussans in Highgate Cemetery

== Works ==
His first work, The Grammar of Heraldry, with the Armorial Bearings of all the Landed Gentry in England prior to the Sixteenth Century (London, 1866), was followed in 1867 by Handbook of Heraldry ... with Instructions for tracing Pedigrees and deciphering Manuscripts (London, several editions). He worked for fifteen years on his county history, A History of Hertfordshire, containing an account of the Descents of the various Manors, Pedigrees of Families, Antiquities, Local Customs, &c. (Hertford, 16 parts forming three folio volumes, 1870–81). It supplemented the existing histories of Henry Chauncy and Robert Clutterbuck.
