= Dommartin, Rhône =

Dommartin
- Commune
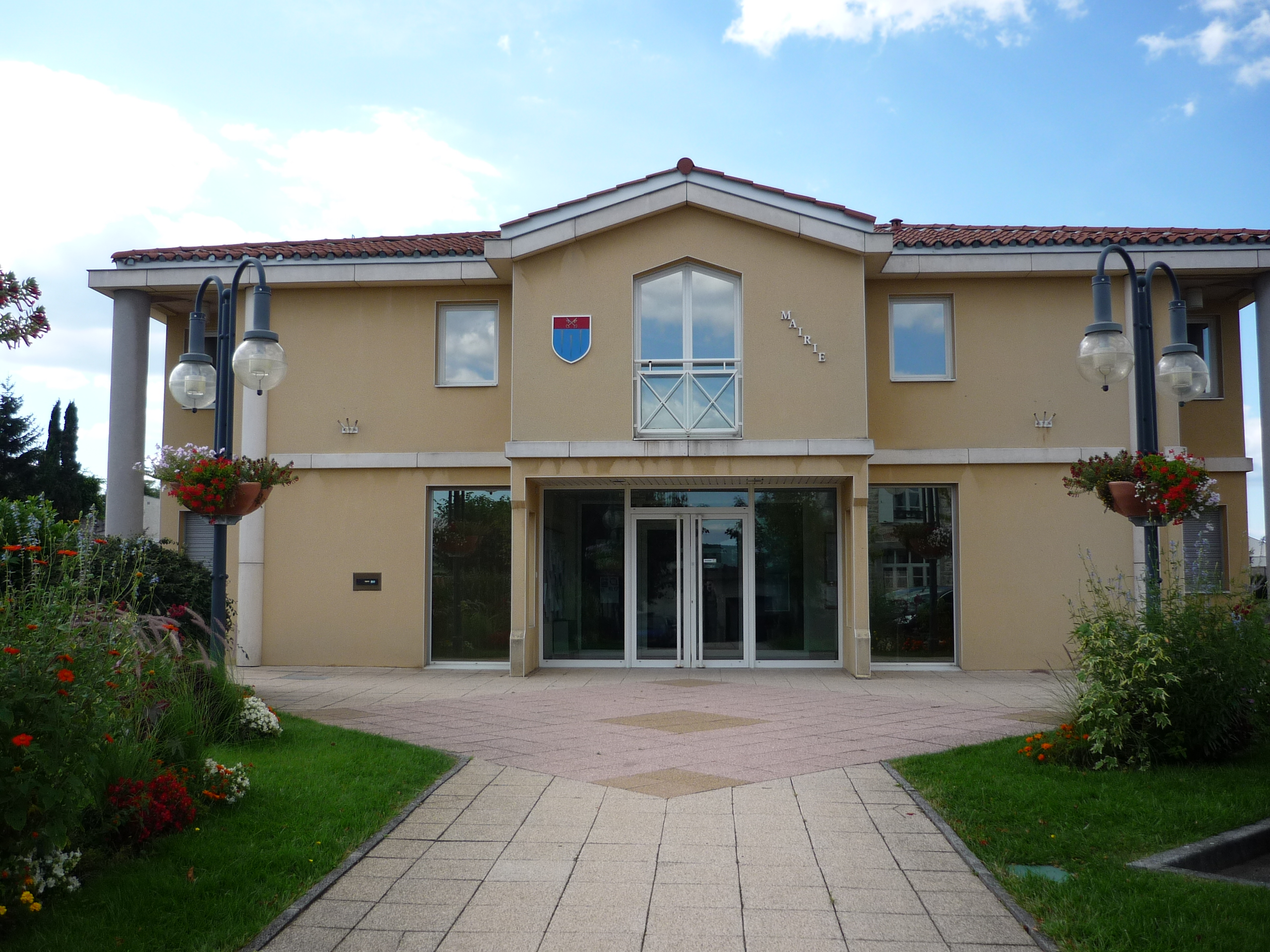
- The town hall in Dommartin

- Coat of arms
- Location of Dommartin
- Location within France Location within Auvergne-Rhône-Alpes
- Coordinates: 45°50′09″N 4°42′43″E
- Country: France
- Region: Auvergne-Rhône-Alpes
- Department: Rhône
- Arrondissement: Villefranche-sur-Saône
- Canton: Anse
- Intercommunality: Pays de L'Arbresle

Government
  - Mayor (2020–2026): Alain Thivillier
- Area^{1}: 7.22 km^{2} (2.79 sq mi)
- Elevation: 291 m (955 ft)
- Highest elevation: 350 m (1,150 ft)
- Lowest elevation: 235 m (771 ft)
- Population (2023): 2,687
  - Density: 372/km^{2} (964/sq mi)
- Time zone: UTC+01:00 (CET)
  - Summer (DST): UTC+02:00 (CEST)
- INSEE/Postal code: 69076 /69380
- ^{1} French Land Register data, which excludes lakes, ponds, glaciers > 1 km^{2} (0.386 sq mi or 247 acres) and river estuaries.

Dommartin (French pronunciation: [dɔ̃maʁtɛ̃]) is a commune in the Rhône department in central-eastern France.

== History ==
On January 7, 1944, former Senator Joseph Serlin was executed at Dommartin by the German occupation authorities, due to his links with the French Resistance.

== Population ==
Historical population
Year	Pop.	±% p.a.
1968	506	—
1975	1,142	+12.33%
1982	1,451	+3.48%
1990	1,616	+1.36%
1999	2,288	+3.94%
2007	2,662	+1.91%
2012	2,671	+0.07%
2017	2,576	−0.72%
2023	2,687	+0.71%
Source: INSEE

== See also ==
- Communes of the Rhône department
