= Lachassagne =

- Commune
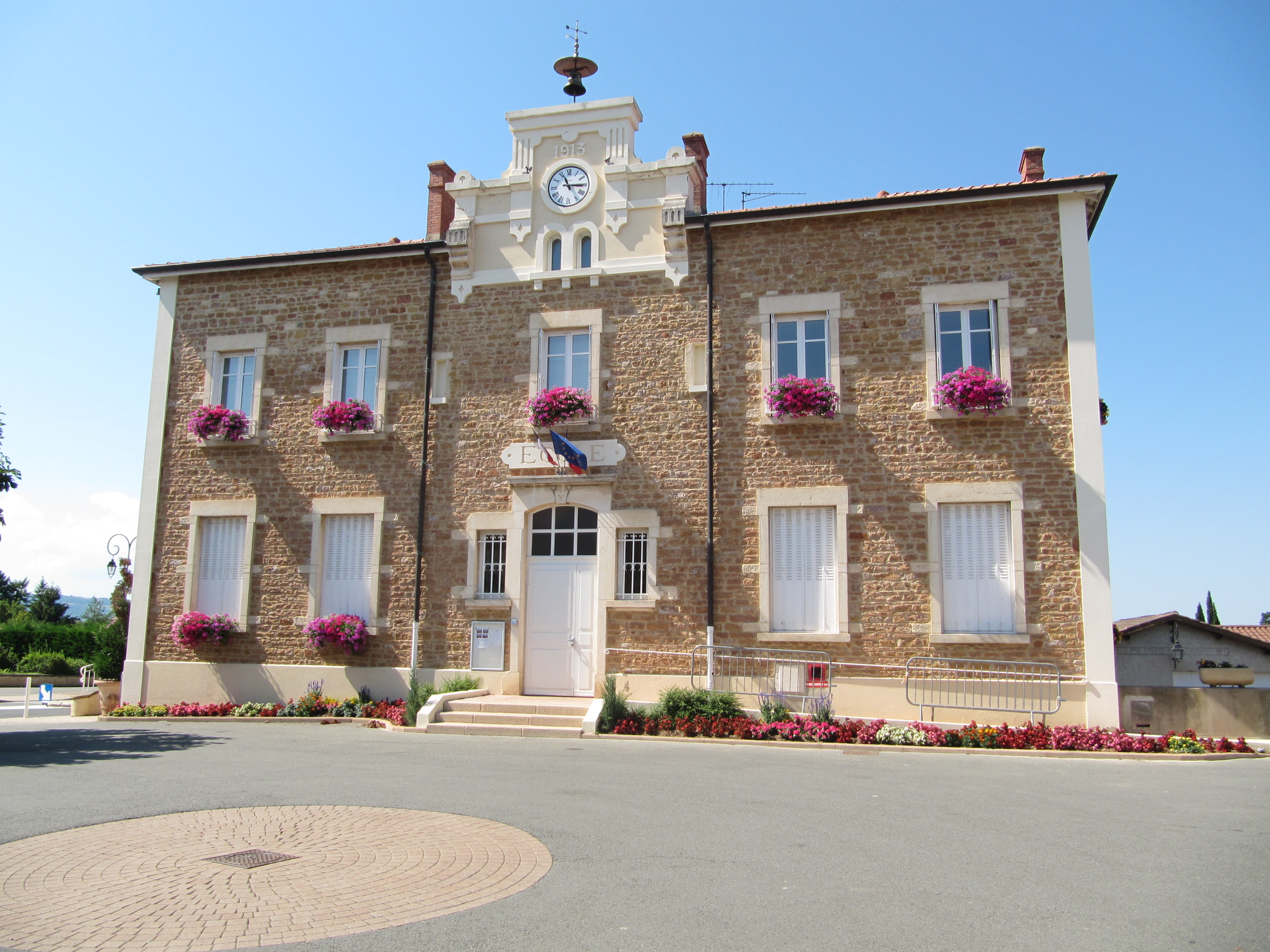
- The town hall in Lachassagne

- Coat of arms
- Location of Lachassagne
- Location within France Location within Auvergne-Rhône-Alpes
- Coordinates: 45°55′59″N 4°40′59″E
- Country: France
- Region: Auvergne-Rhône-Alpes
- Department: Rhône
- Arrondissement: Villefranche-sur-Saône
- Canton: Anse
- Intercommunality: CC Beaujolais Pierres Dorées

Government
  - Mayor (2020–2026): Jean-Paul Hyvernat
- Area^{1}: 3.53 km^{2} (1.36 sq mi)
- Highest elevation: 402 m (1,319 ft)
- Lowest elevation: 250 m (820 ft)
- Population (2023): 1,332
  - Density: 377/km^{2} (977/sq mi)
- Demonym(s): Arlequin, Arlequine
- Time zone: UTC+01:00 (CET)
  - Summer (DST): UTC+02:00 (CEST)
- INSEE/Postal code: 69106 /69480
- ^{1} French Land Register data, which excludes lakes, ponds, glaciers > 1 km^{2} (0.386 sq mi or 247 acres) and river estuaries.

Lachassagne (French pronunciation: [laʃasaɲ]) is a commune in the Rhône department in eastern France.

== See also ==
- Communes of the Rhône department
