= Châtillon, Rhône =

Châtillon
- Commune
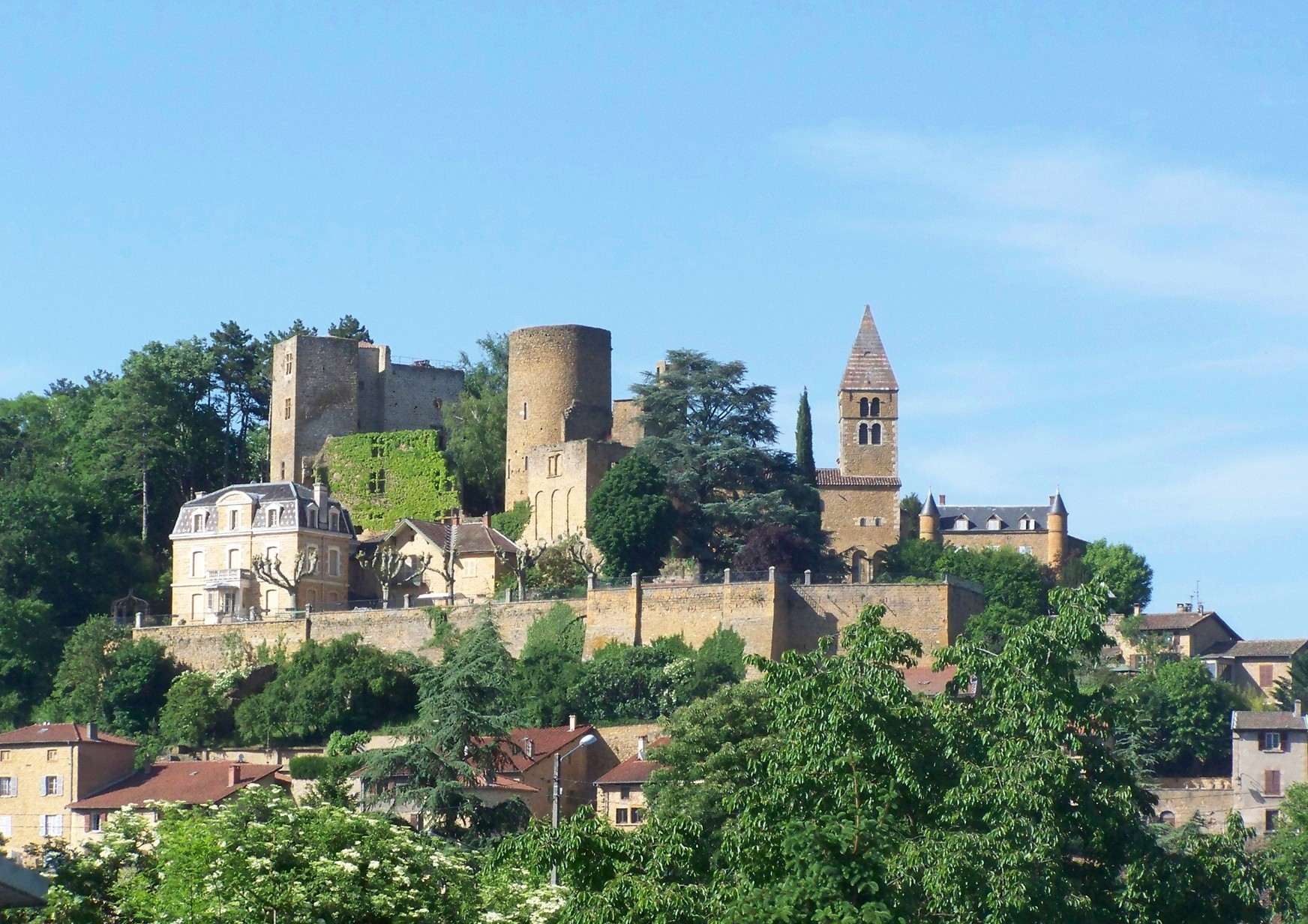
- The village of Châtillon d'Azergues

- Coat of arms
- Location of Châtillon
- Location within France Location within Auvergne-Rhône-Alpes
- Coordinates: 45°52′41″N 4°38′46″E
- Country: France
- Region: Auvergne-Rhône-Alpes
- Department: Rhône
- Arrondissement: Villefranche-sur-Saône
- Canton: Val d'Oingt
- Intercommunality: Beaujolais Pierres Dorées

Government
  - Mayor (2020–2026): Bernard Marconnet
- Area^{1}: 10.71 km^{2} (4.14 sq mi)
- Elevation: 216 m (709 ft)
- Highest elevation: 334 m (1,096 ft)
- Lowest elevation: 199 m (653 ft)
- Population (2023): 2,252
  - Density: 210.3/km^{2} (544.6/sq mi)
- Time zone: UTC+01:00 (CET)
  - Summer (DST): UTC+02:00 (CEST)
- INSEE/Postal code: 69050 /69380
- ^{1} French Land Register data, which excludes lakes, ponds, glaciers > 1 km^{2} (0.386 sq mi or 247 acres) and river estuaries.

Châtillon (French pronunciation: [ʃatijɔ̃]), formerly known as Châtillon-d'Azergues (pronounced [ʃatijɔ̃ dazɛʁɡ]), is a commune in the Rhône department, eastern France.

== Population ==
Historical population
Year	Pop.	±% p.a.
1968	1,211	—
1975	1,381	+1.89%
1982	1,446	+0.66%
1990	1,591	+1.20%
1999	1,873	+1.83%
2007	2,093	+1.40%
2012	2,192	+0.93%
2017	2,137	−0.51%
2023	2,252	+0.88%
Source: INSEE

== Sites and monuments ==
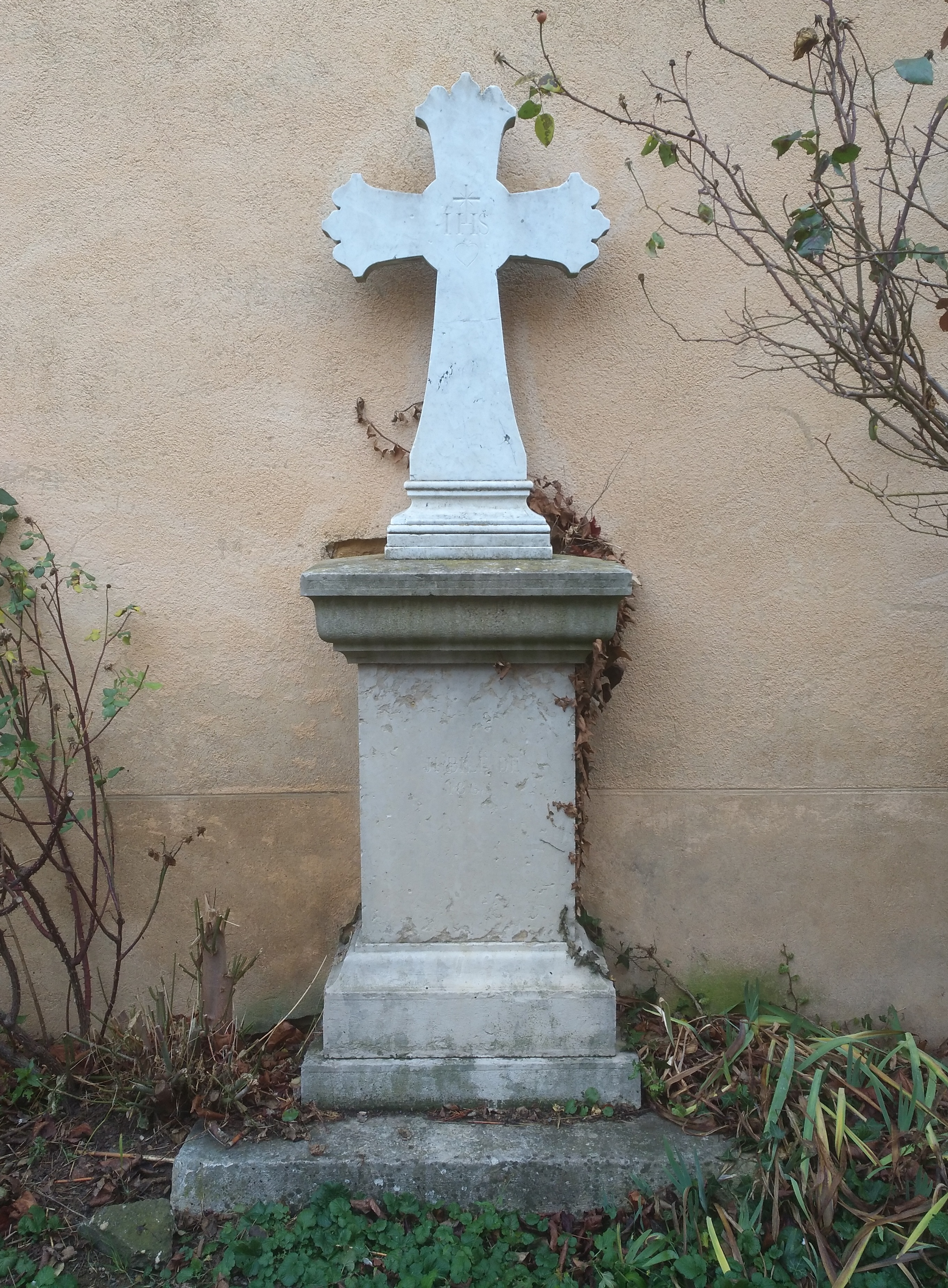
Cross Châtillon-d'Azergues

The Château de Châtillon-d'Azergues, a ruined 13th to 15th century castle, dominates the village. The 12th century Chapel of Saint-Barthélémy, known as Notre-Dame-de-Bon-Secours, is at the side of the castle.

The chapel was listed in 1862 as a monument historique by the French Ministry of Culture; the castle itself has been listed since 1937.

== See also ==
- Communes of the Rhône department
- Azergues
