= Anse, Rhône =

Anse
- Commune
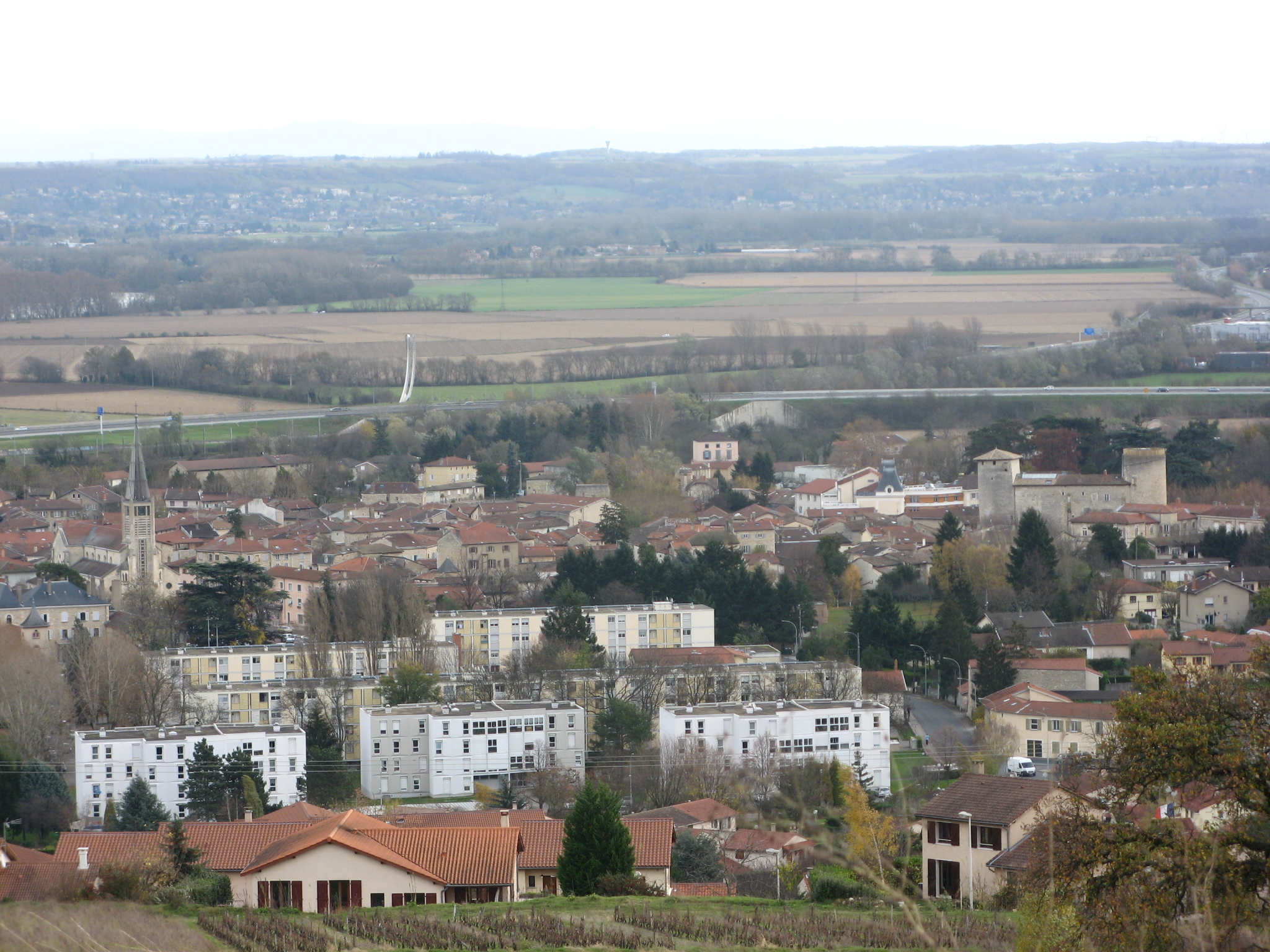
- A general view of Anse

- Coat of arms
- Location of Anse
- Location within France Location within Auvergne-Rhône-Alpes
- Coordinates: 45°56′06″N 4°43′05″E
- Country: France
- Region: Auvergne-Rhône-Alpes
- Department: Rhône
- Arrondissement: Villefranche-sur-Saône
- Canton: Anse
- Intercommunality: CC Beaujolais Pierres Dorées

Government
  - Mayor (2020–2026): Daniel Pomeret
- Area^{1}: 15.23 km^{2} (5.88 sq mi)
- Elevation: 176 m (577 ft)
- Highest elevation: 358 m (1,175 ft)
- Lowest elevation: 167 m (548 ft)
- Population (2023): 8,206
  - Density: 538.8/km^{2} (1,395/sq mi)
- Demonym: Ansois
- Time zone: UTC+01:00 (CET)
  - Summer (DST): UTC+02:00 (CEST)
- INSEE/Postal code: 69009 /69480
- ^{1} French Land Register data, which excludes lakes, ponds, glaciers > 1 km^{2} (0.386 sq mi or 247 acres) and river estuaries.

Anse (French pronunciation: [ɑ̃s]) is a commune in the Rhône department in eastern France. It is situated on the river Saône, approx. 7 km south of Villefranche-sur-Saône (near Lyon).

== Councils of Anse ==
Several medieval councils were held in this French town.

That of 994 decreed, among other disciplinary measures, abstinence from servile labour after three o'clock (None) on Saturday, i.e. the observance of the vigil of Sunday.

The council of 1025 was held for the purpose of settling a conflict between the monks of Cluny Abbey and the Bishop of Mâcon, who complained that, though their monastery was situated in his diocese, the monks had obtained ordination from the Archbishop of Vienne. Odilon of Cluny was present and exhibited a papal privilege exempting his monastery from the episcopal jurisdiction of Mâcon. But the fathers of the council caused to be read the ancient canons ordaining that in every country the abbots and monks should be subject to their own bishop, and declared null a privilege contrary to the canons. The Archbishop of Vienne was required to apologize to the Bishop of Mâcon.

In 1076 a council was held for the purpose of furthering the ecclesiastical reforms of Gregory VII.

At the council of 1100, Hugues, Archbishop of Lyon, demanded from the assembled fathers, among whom was Anselm of Canterbury, a subsidy for the expenses of the journey that, with the Pope's permission, he was about to make to Jerusalem.

== Population ==
Historical population
Year	Pop.	±% p.a.
1968	2,630	—
1975	3,116	+2.45%
1982	3,705	+2.50%
1990	4,458	+2.34%
1999	4,744	+0.69%
2007	5,033	+0.74%
2012	6,450	+5.09%
2017	7,178	+2.16%
2023	8,206	+2.26%
Source: INSEE

== People ==
- John Claudius Neraz, (1828–1894), born in Anse, Roman Catholic priest, bishop of San Antonio, Texas.

== See also ==
- Chemin de fer Touristique d'Anse
- Communes of the Rhône department
