= Azergues =

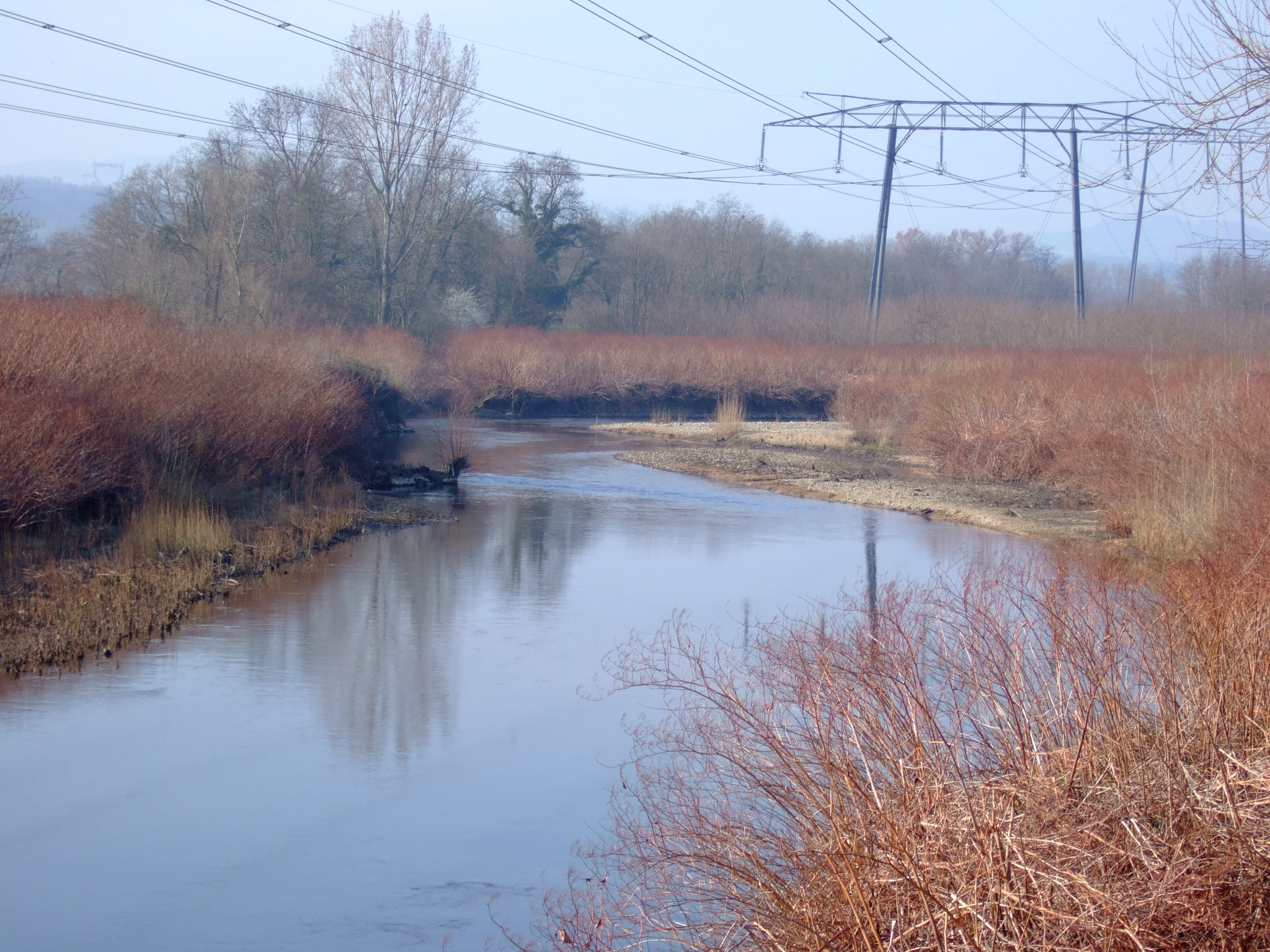

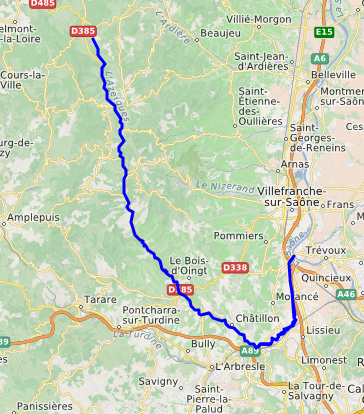

Location
- Country: France

Physical characteristics
- Mouth
  - location: Saône
  - coordinates: 45°56′30″N 4°43′45″E
- Length: 62 km (39 mi)
- Basin size: 886 km^{2} (342 mi^{2})
- Discharge
  - average: 75 m^{3}/s (2,600 cu ft/s)

Basin features
- Progression: Saône→ Rhône→ Mediterranean Sea

The Azergues (French pronunciation: [azɛʁɡ]) is a river in the department of Rhône, eastern France. It is a right tributary of the Saône, which it joins in Anse. It is 62.4 km (38.8 mi) long. Its source is in the Beaujolais hills, near Chénelette. The Azergues flows through the following towns: Lamure-sur-Azergues, Le Bois-d'Oingt, Chessy, Châtillon, Chazay-d'Azergues and Anse.

== Etymology ==
It has been suggested that the name Azergues comes from the Arabic "Azraq" (أزرق), which means blue.
