= Tornado outbreak of November 15–16, 1955 =

Weather event in the United States

Meteorological history
- Formed: November 15, 1955
- Dissipated: November 16, 1955

Tornado outbreak
- Tornadoes: 18
- Max. rating: F3 tornado
- Duration: 14 hours and 20 minutes
- Highest winds: 91 mph (146 km/h)
- Largest hail: 7.5 in (19 cm)

Overall effects
- Fatalities: 1 (+13 non-tornadic)
- Injuries: 35 (+≥32 non-tornadic injuries)
- Damage: $4.7 million (1955 USD)
- Areas affected: Mississippi and Ohio Valleys
- Part of the tornado outbreaks of 1955

An unusually intense fall outbreak of tornadoes caused considerable damage to the Mississippi and Ohio Valleys. One person was killed, 35 others were injured, and damages reached $4.665 million (1955 USD). A total of 13 other people were killed and over 32 others were injured by non-tornadic events as well.

== Meteorological synopsis ==
A low-pressure system formed over Nevada on November 14 and moved quickly eastward into Nebraska by the next day. It slowed down and rapidly deepened as it moved through Northwestern Iowa into Wisconsin by November 16. Favorable conditions led to a huge blow up of thunderstorms across the Mississippi and Ohio Valleys. These storms quickly became severe and tornadic as they moved generally eastward.

== Confirmed tornadoes ==
Confirmed tornadoes by Fujita rating
FU	F0	F1	F2	F3	F4	F5	Total
0	1	7	5	5	0	0	18

Note: The CDNS list several other suspected tornadoes that were not included in the final total.

- A suspected tornado accompanied by damaging straight-line winds destroyed two homes, damaged four others, and downed wires and trees in Kirklin, Terhune and Elizaville, Indiana on November 15.
- A suspected tornado accompanied by straight-line winds and heavy rain smashed several barns and damaged three homes in Polks Park, Indiana before moving into Gentryville, where two filling stations were demolished and three homes were damaged on November 15.

=== November 15 event ===
List of confirmed tornadoes – Tuesday, November 15, 1955 (Note: All dates are based on the local time zone where the tornado touched down; however, all times are in Coordinated Universal Time and dates are split at midnight CST/CDT for consistency.) (Note: Prior to 1994, only the average widths of tornado paths were officially listed.)
F#	Location	County / Parish	State	Start coord.	Time (UTC)	Path length	Max. width	Summary
F1	S of Witter	Madison	AR	35.90°N 93.67°W	18:00–?	0.1 miles (0.16 km)	10 yards (9.1 m)	A brief tornado developed over Buffalo Tower on the Nubbin Ridge, damaging a house. Losses only totaled $250.
F1	N of Longview	Champaign	IL	39.90°N 88.07°W	21:00–?	0.1 miles (0.16 km)	10 yards (9.1 m)	A brief tornado threw a 20 by 30-foot building 1/4 mile (0.40 km) from its original location. No monetary damage value was given.
F3	Heber Springs to Hutchinson to Huff to Northern Newark	Cleburne, Independence	AR	35.48°N 92.03°W	21:17–22:00	36.5 miles (58.7 km)	133 yards (122 m)	1 death – See section on this tornado – Four people were injured and damage was estimated at $1 million.
F2	Casa	Perry	AR	35.03°N 93.05°W	21:26–?	1.5 miles (2.4 km)	73 yards (67 m)	A strong tornado touched down five or six times as it moved northeastward through the north side of Casa. Two homes and two other buildings were destroyed while three other homes and 13 other buildings were damaged. Some brick building "appeared to show explosive action." Damages were estimated at $250,000. A loud roaring sound was heard by Weather Bureau meteorologists that were hunting in the Ouachita National Forest about 25 miles (40 km) southwest of town.
F1	SSE of Schuline to SSE of Sparta	Randolph	IL	38.07°N 89.77°W	21:30–?	4.5 miles (7.2 km)	880 yards (800 m)	This large tornado accompanied by large hail moved over open terrain. Although officially listed as causing no monetary damages, the CDNS report list $10,500 in damage, with hail doing an additional $5,000 in damage.
F1	Southeastern Schram City	Montgomery	IL	39.15°N 89.45°W	21:35–?	0.1 miles (0.16 km)	10 yards (9.1 m)	A brief, but destructive tornado completely destroyed a barn east of Hillsboro. Losses totaled $25,000. Severe winds and hail caused more damage to buildings, trees, and power lines further downwind in Ohlman and Rosamond.
F1	Southwestern Pana	Christian	IL	29.95°N 93.93°W	22:45–?	0.1 miles (0.16 km)	10 yards (9.1 m)	A brief tornado embedded within a larger swath of wind damage destroyed several farm buildings on the southwest side of Pana. No monetary damage was given. The tornado came from the same storm that produced the Schram City tornado. The storm itself traveled 50 miles (80 km) from there to Bethany in Moultrie County, causing $75,000 in damage.
F3	N of Hopewell	Cleburne	AR	35.43°N 92.08°W	23:00–?	0.1 miles (0.16 km)	10 yards (9.1 m)	A brief, but strong tornado occurred southwest of Heber Springs just under two hours after the previous F3 tornado hit the town. It blew a tree down onto a car before tossing it again. A barn was also blown over and destroyed. Losses totaled $25,000. The tornado was not listed as significant by Grazulis.
F0	E of Jamaica	Vermilion	IL	39.98°N 87.77°W	23:00–?	0.2 miles (0.32 km)	10 yards (9.1 m)	A brief tornado struck a farm, causing $250 in damage. The CDNS report list the damage as being $500.
F1	Boonville	Warrick	IN	38.05°N 87.27°W	00:00–?	0.1 miles (0.16 km)	10 yards (9.1 m)	A suspected damaging tornado was later confirmed to have touched down right over Boonville, blowing away and destroying a barn and knocking a tractor off the road. There was $2,500 in damage.
F3	Alicia of ESE of Calvin	Lawrence	AR	35.92°N 91.02°W	00:05–?	3.8 miles (6.1 km)	880 yards (800 m)	This large, strong tornado moved through Alicia, destroying nine homes and 12 other buildings while damaging six homes and eight other buildings. There were nine injuries and $250,000 in damage.
F3	Eastern Evansville	Vanderburgh	IN	37.97°N 87.53°W	01:20–?	2 miles (3.2 km)	50 yards (46 m)	See section on this tornado – Nine people were injured and damage was estimated at $250,000.
F2	NNW of Tuttle to Hartwell to N of Huntsville	Washington, Madison	AR	36.05°N 94.00°W	01:30–?	15 miles (24 km)	220 yards (200 m)	This tornado touched down over mountainous terrain and moved east-northeastward through rural areas, striking the town of Hartwell before dissipating. One person was injured and there was $2,500 in damage.
F3	W of Lynn, IN to Sharpeye, OH to Greenville, OH	Randolph (IN), Darke (OH)	IN, OH	40.10°N 84.63°W	01:30–?	21 miles (34 km)	400 yards (370 m)	See section on this tornado – There were eight injuries and $2.525 million in damage.
F1	Decker area	Knox	IN	38.52°N 87.52°W	04:00–?	0.1 miles (0.16 km)	10 yards (9.1 m)	A brief, but damaging tornado struck an area about 12 miles (19 km) west of Decker, twisting a barn to pieces and blowing out windows in three separate homes. Winds from the storm sounded like a "freight train" according to witnesses. Ping-pong-ball size hail that accompanied the tornado, which caused $25,000 in damage, struck the town of Decker itself, damaging churches, schools, and private homes while severely damaging roofs.
F2	Downtown Indianapolis	Marion	IN	38.52°N 87.52°W	04:35–?	0.1 miles (0.16 km)	10 yards (9.1 m)	A strong tornado touched down right over Downtown Indianapolis and moved east-northeastward. A garage was demolished, timber was scattered, an apple tree was uprooted, a large brick building was partially unroofed, and a few other buildings suffered some damage. There were two injuries, and losses totaled $25,000. The tornado was not listed as significant by Grazulis.

=== November 16 event ===
List of confirmed tornadoes – Wednesday, November 16, 1955
F#	Location	County / Parish	State	Start coord.	Time (UTC)	Path length	Max. width	Summary
F2	NE of South Fork to SW of Carson	Howell	MO	36.67°N 91.90°W	06:15–?	4.3 miles (6.9 km)	1,000 yards (910 m)	A large tornado hit the southern side of West Plains, missing the center part of town by only a mile. Three homes were destroyed and 23 other homes and 10 other buildings were damaged. One house was split in half. There were two injuries, which included a man being thrown 150 yards (140 m), and $25,000 in damage.
F2	NE of Valley Mission to E of Anna	Union	IL	37.43°N 89.27°W	08:20–?	4.5 miles (7.2 km)	150 yards (140 m)	This strong tornado accompanied by hail moved east-northeast through the south sides of Jonesboro and Anna before moving into a rural area and dissipating. Although the funnel was only a few yards in diameter, the destruction was 50 to 300 yards (46 to 274 m) wide. Multiple factory buildings were demolished and damage was estimated at $250,000. The CDNS stated that had the storm occurred during the day, many lives may have been lost.

=== Heber Springs–Hutchinson–Huff–Northern Newark, Arkansas ===
Heber Springs–Hutchinson–Huff–Northern Newark, Arkansas
F3 tornado
- on the Fujita scale

Overall effects
- Casualties: 1 fatality, 4 injuries
- Damage: $1 million (1955 USD)
- Areas affected: Eastern Ozarks

The only fatal one of the outbreak, this long-tracked, strong F3 tornado was first seen as a funnel cloud southwest of Heber Springs. The funnel moved northeastward before touching down on the southeast side of town and moving over Round Mountain. Severe property damage occurred in this area and one person was injured. It then crossed over the Little Red River, moving over mountainous terrain before moving into Independence County. Throughout Cleburne County, one person was injured, seven homes and four buildings were destroyed, 107 homes and 40 other buildings were damaged, and there was $250,000 in damage.

Moving into Independence County, the tornado caused catastrophic damage as it hit the town of Floral. Multiple structures in several areas were destroyed and one person was injured. It moved back over mountainous terrain before causing more destruction in Hutchinson, which saw $250,000 in damage when multiple areas were destroyed. The lone fatality from the entire outbreak, as well as two injuries, occurred here. The tornado then turned east-northeast and reached its peak intensity, causing heavy damage in Huff and near Rosie. The tornado then moved into Magness, damaging 20 homes, a church, a feed mill, and other buildings. The tornado was last spotted in Wycough Township north of Newark, where a home was destroyed and three houses and a church were damaged. Shortly afterwards, the tornado dissipated south of Mt. Carmel. Throughout Independence County, the tornado destroyed 22 homes and 18 other buildings, damaged 29 homes and 22 other buildings, and caused one death, three injuries, and $750,000 in damage.

The tornado was on the ground for at least 43 minutes, traveled 36.5 miles (58.7 km), was 133 yards (122 m) wide at its peak, and caused $1 million in damage. One person was killed and four others were injured. The tornado was rated F2 by Grazulis.

=== Eastern Evansville, Indiana ===
Eastern Evansville, Indiana
F3 tornado
- on the Fujita scale

Overall effects
- Injuries: 9
- Damage: $250,000 (1955 USD)
- Areas affected: Evansville, Indiana

A very destructive, nighttime F3 tornado touched down right over Eastern Evansville and heavily damaged the area, destroying five homes and damaging 70 others. In one extreme case, a house was twisted off its foundation and blown away with its heavy window air conditioning unit thrown into the yard, a post driven through the storm door and through the roof before it was blown off, and a metal carport on the property being found over a mile away. Miraculously, all the three people, including the mother, survived, including two small children that were blown off their chairs, rolled up into the living room rug, and lodged under a stone planter box, protecting them from the tornado. The tornado traveled 2 miles (3.2 km) and was 50 yards (46 m) wide. It injured nine and caused $250,000 in damage. Witnesses did not see the funnel of the tornado due to the darkness, but did report a roar that sounded like an approaching airplane as it went through.

=== Lynn, Indiana/Sharpeye–Greenville, Ohio ===
Lynn, Indiana/Sharpeye–Greenville, Ohio
F3 tornado
- on the Fujita scale

Overall effects
- Injuries: 8
- Damage: $2.525 million (1955 USD)

This large, strong F3 tornado touched down west of Lynn, Indiana and moved northeastward. A home in the path was obliterated, injuring all seven occupants, including a young child who was stripped of clothing. The residents of the home heard a "train" roar as the tornado approached and a passing motorists saw the funnel and house before a bolt a lightning revealed the destroyed home. Two cars on the property were tossed into an adjacent field as well. In the vicinity of Carlos, Lynn, and Spartansburg, the tornado wrecked and smashed a garage and a school bus, damaged many roofs, sheds and barns, and flattened corn to the tune of 50% losses before crossing into Ohio. At this point, the tornado was moving more east-northeastward and skipping, passing Sharpeye, Longtown, and Nashville. It then touched down solidly again about 7 miles (11 km) west of Greenville. The Commodity Credit Corporation and the surrounding area suffered damage to farm buildings, utility lines, some standing crops, and large grain bins. One man was injured by flying glass in this area. The tornado then moved into areas just north of the city limits of Greenville before finally dissipating. The tornado traveled 21 miles (34 km) and was 440 yards (400 m) wide. There were eight injuries and $2.525 million in damage.

== Non-tornadic impacts ==
Many hail and wind reports came out of this event. A peak wind gust of 91 miles per hour (146 km/h) was recorded at Tyrrell, Ohio. Illinois saw many large hail reports on November 15 with baseball-sized hail being recorded in rural Northern Effingham County as well as Western Browns.

On November 15 in Gibson and near Fagus, Missouri, several barns were damaged by winds and lightning burned a house to the ground. In Spiceland, Indiana, a trailer and its contents were extensively damaged when it was picked and thrown by the winds and two people were killed when they came into contact with high-voltage power lines that were blown down. A young man was also killed in Huntington County, Indiana when he was struck by lightning while hunting. Lightning also destroyed a grain elevator in Gwynneville, Indiana. Many large and very large hail reports came out of Indiana, including some hailstones that reached 7.5 inches (19 cm) in diameter west of Lebanon. The towns of Milledgeville, Whitestown, Kingman, Alamo, Middleton, and New Market were all heavily damaged by severe hail with New Market describing it as "rough hunks of ice the size of hens' eggs". Overnight in Centerville, Ohio, straight-line winds and heavy rains damaged farm buildings and flooded basements, injuring three. High-tension lines were also downed, killing one person that came in contact with it. The event was unofficially referred to as a tornado, although a through investigation determined that it was straight-line winds. Early the next morning in Franklin, Arkansas, very heavy rain forced the Sugar Creek and Youngs Creek out of their banks, necessitating evacuation of 45-50 families and causing damage to household furnishings, some commercial establishments, warehouses, and basements, closed the main highway in town, and undermined some sections of pavement. Straight-line winds on November 16 destroyed a cinder block house in Somerset County, Pennsylvania, injuring three while five others were injured in Chicago due to winds breaking out a store window. Chicago also saw broken trees, downed power lines, and more shattered windows.

The storm system transitioned when it got into Iowa on November 15, producing blizzard conditions in Wisconsin while also generating snow and high winds over Iowa, Michigan and New York. This was the deadliest part of the event, killing nine and injuring over 20, including one 12-year-old boy in Washburn County, Wisconsin that suffocated in heavy snow on November 17.

== See also ==
- List of North American tornadoes and tornado outbreaks
