= East Fork =

East Fork is the name of the following places in the United States of America:

- East Fork, Alaska
- East Fork, Arizona
- East Fork, California
- East Fork Township, Montgomery County, Illinois
- East Fork Township, Clinton County, Illinois
- East Fork, Kentucky
- East Fork Township, Benson County, North Dakota
- East Fork Township, Williams County, North Dakota
- East Fork State Park, Ohio
- East Fork, Pennsylvania

== Computing ==
- East Fork was an early name for the Intel Viiv initiative

== See also ==
- East Fork Township (disambiguation)
