= Coalton, Illinois =

- Village
- Location in Montgomery County, Illinois
- Coordinates: 39°17′05″N 89°18′11″W
- Country: United States
- State: Illinois
- County: Montgomery
- Township: Nokomis

Area
  - Total: 0.53 sq mi (1.37 km^{2})
  - Land: 0.53 sq mi (1.37 km^{2})
  - Water: 0 sq mi (0.00 km^{2})
- Elevation: 676 ft (206 m)

Population (2020)
  - Total: 317
  - Density: 598.6/sq mi (231.13/km^{2})
- Time zone: UTC-6 (CST)
  - Summer (DST): UTC-5 (CDT)
- ZIP code: 62075 (Nokomis)
- Area code: 217
- FIPS code: 17-15209
- GNIS feature ID: 2398590

Coalton is a village in Montgomery County, Illinois, United States. The population was 317 at the 2020 census.

== Geography ==
Coalton is in eastern Montgomery County and is bordered to the northeast by the city of Nokomis. Illinois Route 16 runs along the northwest edge of the village, leading southwest 15 miles (24 km) to Hillsboro, the county seat, and northeast 14 miles (23 km) to Pana.

According to the U.S. Census Bureau, Coalton has a total area of 0.53 square miles (1.37 km^{2}), all land. The village drains northwest to the East Fork of Shoal Creek, a south-flowing tributary of the Kaskaskia River.

== Demographics ==
Historical population
Census	Pop.	Note	%±
1920	991		—
1930	611		−38.3%
1940	459		−24.9%
1950	402		−12.4%
1960	352		−12.4%
1970	304		−13.6%
1980	406		33.6%
1990	359		−11.6%
2000	307		−14.5%
2010	304		−1.0%
2020	317		4.3%
U.S. Decennial Census

As of the census of 2000, there were 307 people, 123 households, and 79 families residing in the village. The population density was 592.1 inhabitants per square mile (228.6/km^{2}). There were 132 housing units at an average density of 254.6 per square mile (98.3/km^{2}). The racial makeup of the village was 97.07% White, 0.33% Native American, 0.65% Asian, 0.33% from other races, and 1.63% from two or more races. Hispanic or Latino of any race were 0.98% of the population.

There were 123 households, out of which 34.1% had children under the age of 18 living with them, 57.7% were married couples living together, 4.9% had a female householder with no husband present, and 35.0% were non-families. 32.5% of all households were made up of individuals, and 22.0% had someone living alone who was 65 years of age or older. The average household size was 2.50 and the average family size was 3.24.

In the village, the population was spread out, with 29.0% under the age of 18, 7.8% from 18 to 24, 22.5% from 25 to 44, 24.4% from 45 to 64, and 16.3% who were 65 years of age or older. The median age was 40 years. For every 100 females, there were 83.8 males. For every 100 females age 18 and over, there were 83.2 males.

The median income for a household in the village was $37,500, and the median income for a family was $46,250. Males had a median income of $40,455 versus $15,938 for females. The per capita income for the village was $21,901. About 13.5% of families and 22.6% of the population were below the poverty line, including 38.1% of those under the age of eighteen and 12.2% of those 65 or over.

Coalton became significant during the early to mid-twentieth century with its shaft mining operations, hence its village name.

== Notable people ==
- Red Ruffing, pitcher for the New York Yankees and 1967 inductee in the Baseball Hall of Fame, was raised in Coalton.
