= Walshville, Illinois =

- Village
- Location in Montgomery County, Illinois
- Coordinates: 39°04′08″N 89°37′08″W
- Country: United States
- State: Illinois
- County: Montgomery
- Township: Walshville

Area
  - Total: 0.25 sq mi (0.66 km^{2})
  - Land: 0.25 sq mi (0.66 km^{2})
  - Water: 0 sq mi (0.00 km^{2})
- Elevation: 614 ft (187 m)

Population (2020)
  - Total: 61
  - Density: 240/sq mi (92.6/km^{2})
- Time zone: UTC-6 (CST)
  - Summer (DST): UTC-5 (CDT)
- ZIP code: 62091
- Area code: 217
- FIPS code: 17-78656
- GNIS feature ID: 2400089

Walshville is a small village in Montgomery County, Illinois, United States. The population was 61 at the 2020 census.

== Geography ==
Walshville is in southwestern Montgomery County, 12 miles (19 km) southwest of Hillsboro, the county seat, 10 miles (16 km) south of Litchfield, and 6 miles (10 km) east of Mount Olive.

According to the U.S. Census Bureau, Walshville has a total area of 0.25 square miles (0.65 km^{2}), all land. The village drains east to tributaries of the Lake Fork of Shoal Creek, part of the Kaskaskia River watershed.

== Demographics ==
Historical population
Census	Pop.	Note	%±
1880	188		—
1890	167		−11.2%
1900	130		−22.2%
1910	169		30.0%
1920	180		6.5%
1930	118		−34.4%
1940	130		10.2%
1950	113		−13.1%
1960	123		8.8%
1970	100		−18.7%
1980	106		6.0%
1990	44		−58.5%
2000	89		102.3%
2010	64		−28.1%
2020	61		−4.7%
U.S. Decennial Census

As of the census of 2000, there were 89 people, 28 households, and 23 families residing in the village. The population density was 348.1 inhabitants per square mile (134.4/km^{2}). There were 29 housing units at an average density of 113.4 per square mile (43.8/km^{2}). The racial makeup of the village was 100.00% White.

There were 28 households, out of which 53.6% had children under the age of 18 living with them, 67.9% were married couples living together, 10.7% had a female householder with no husband present, and 14.3% were non-families. 10.7% of all households were made up of individuals, and 7.1% had someone living alone who was 65 years of age or older. The average household size was 3.18 and the average family size was 3.38.

In the village, the population was spread out, with 34.8% under the age of 18, 6.7% from 18 to 24, 33.7% from 25 to 44, 15.7% from 45 to 64, and 9.0% who were 65 years of age or older. The median age was 31 years. For every 100 females, there were 102.3 males. For every 100 females age 18 and over, there were 114.8 males.

The median income for a household in the village was $19,219, and the median income for a family was $19,375. Males had a median income of $80,102 versus $20,625 for females. The per capita income for the village was $11,080. There were 24.1% of families and 40.0% of the population living below the poverty line, including 65.5% of under eighteens and none of those over 64.
