= Witt, Illinois =

- City
- Location in Montgomery County, Illinois
- Coordinates: 39°15′04″N 89°20′58″W
- Country: United States
- State: Illinois
- County: Montgomery
- Township: Witt

Area
  - Total: 1.24 sq mi (3.21 km^{2})
  - Land: 1.24 sq mi (3.21 km^{2})
  - Water: 0 sq mi (0.00 km^{2})
- Elevation: 659 ft (201 m)

Population (2020)
  - Total: 785
  - Density: 634.1/sq mi (244.84/km^{2})
- Time zone: UTC−6 (CST)
  - Summer (DST): UTC−5 (CDT)
- ZIP code: 62094
- Area code: 217
- FIPS code: 17-82725
- GNIS feature ID: 2397356

Witt is a city in Montgomery County, Illinois, United States. The population was 785 at the 2020 census, down from 903 in 2010.

== Geography ==
Witt is in eastern Montgomery County along Illinois Route 16, which leads 11 miles (18 km) southwest to Hillsboro, the county seat, and 4.5 miles (7.2 km) northeast to Nokomis.

According to the U.S. Census Bureau, Witt has a total area of 1.2 square miles (3.1 km^{2}), all land.

== Demographics ==
Historical population
Census	Pop.	Note	%±
1900	428		—
1910	2,170		407.0%
1920	2,443		12.6%
1930	1,516		−37.9%
1940	1,490		−1.7%
1950	1,156		−22.4%
1960	1,101		−4.8%
1970	1,040		−5.5%
1980	1,205		15.9%
1990	866		−28.1%
2000	991		14.4%
2010	903		−8.9%
2020	785		−13.1%
U.S. Decennial Census

As of the census of 2000, there were 991 people, 438 households, and 261 families residing in the city. The population density was 710.9 inhabitants per square mile (274.5/km^{2}). There were 480 housing units at an average density of 344.3 per square mile (132.9/km^{2}).

The racial makeup of the city was 99.50% White, 0.10% African American, 0.20% Asian, and 0.20% from two or more races. Hispanic or Latino of any race were 0.20% of the population.

There were 438 households, out of which 26.5% had children under the age of 18 living with them, 47.9% were married couples living together, 7.5% had a female householder with no husband present, and 40.4% were non-families. 35.4% of all households were made up of individuals, and 19.2% had someone living alone who was 65 years of age or older. The average household size was 2.26 and the average family size was 2.94.

In the city the population was spread out, with 23.8% under the age of 18, 6.0% from 18 to 24, 27.1% from 25 to 44, 23.0% from 45 to 64, and 20.1% who were 65 years of age or older. The median age was 40 years. For every 100 females, there were 87.7 males. For every 100 females age 18 and over, there were 85.0 males.

The median income for a household in the city was $25,329, and the median income for a family was $32,344. Males had a median income of $31,927 versus $19,861 for females. The per capita income for the city was $14,817. About 17.2% of families and 21.4% of the population were below the poverty line, including 28.5% of those under age 18 and 10.1% of those age 65 or over.

== Notable person ==
- Glen Hobbie, pitcher for the Chicago Cubs and St. Louis Cardinals
