= Taylor Springs, Illinois =

- Village
- Location in Montgomery County, Illinois
- Coordinates: 39°07′45″N 89°30′05″W
- Country: United States
- State: Illinois
- County: Montgomery
- Township: Hillsboro

Area
  - Total: 1.09 sq mi (2.82 km^{2})
  - Land: 1.05 sq mi (2.73 km^{2})
  - Water: 0.035 sq mi (0.09 km^{2})
- Elevation: 623 ft (190 m)

Population (2020)
  - Total: 724
  - Density: 686.2/sq mi (264.93/km^{2})
- Time zone: UTC-6 (CST)
  - Summer (DST): UTC-5 (CDT)
- ZIP code: 62089
- Area code: 217
- FIPS code: 17-74561
- GNIS feature ID: 2399958
- Website: taylorspringsil.com

Taylor Springs is a village in Montgomery County, Illinois, United States. The population was 724 at the 2020 census.

== Geography ==
The village is in south-central Montgomery County and is bordered to the north and east by Hillsboro, the county seat. Illinois Route 127 passes through the east side of the village, leading north into Hillsboro and south 18 miles (29 km) to Greenville. Illinois Route 185 crosses the northeast corner of Taylor Springs and leads southeast 26 miles (42 km) to Vandalia.

According to the U.S. Census Bureau, Taylor Springs has a total area of 1.09 square miles (2.82 km^{2}), of which 0.03 square miles (0.08 km^{2}), or 3.03%, are water. The village drains west toward the Middle Fork of Shoal Creek, a south-flowing tributary of the Kaskaskia River.

== Demographics ==
Historical population
Census	Pop.	Note	%±
1910	380		—
1920	1,526		301.6%
1930	774		−49.3%
1940	624		−19.4%
1950	627		0.5%
1960	550		−12.3%
1970	620		12.7%
1980	671		8.2%
1990	670		−0.1%
2000	583		−13.0%
2010	690		18.4%
2020	724		4.9%
U.S. Decennial Census

As of the census of 2000, there were 583 people, 250 households, and 162 families residing in the village. The population density was 677.1 inhabitants per square mile (261.4/km^{2}). There were 264 housing units at an average density of 306.6 per square mile (118.4/km^{2}). The racial makeup of the village was 98.80% White, 0.17% Native American, 0.69% from other races, and 0.34% from two or more races. Hispanic or Latino of any race were 1.03% of the population.

There were 250 households, out of which 31.2% had children under the age of 18 living with them, 52.4% were married couples living together, 9.2% had a female householder with no husband present, and 34.8% were non-families. 31.2% of all households were made up of individuals, and 13.2% had someone living alone who was 65 years of age or older. The average household size was 2.33 and the average family size was 2.91.

In the village, the population was spread out, with 24.7% under the age of 18, 7.5% from 18 to 24, 29.2% from 25 to 44, 22.0% from 45 to 64, and 16.6% who were 65 years of age or older. The median age was 39 years. For every 100 females, there were 107.5 males. For every 100 females age 18 and over, there were 99.5 males.

The median income for a household in the village was $29,773, and the median income for a family was $35,000. Males had a median income of $37,361 versus $18,056 for females. The per capita income for the village was $14,279. About 3.8% of families and 9.1% of the population were below the poverty line, including 5.4% of those under age 18 and 15.1% of those age 65 or over.
