= Lake Glenn Shoals =

- Location within Illinois
- Location: Montgomery County, Illinois
- Coordinates: 39°12′19″N 89°27′55″W
- Type: reservoir
- Primary inflows: Shoal Creek
- Primary outflows: Shoal Creek
- Basin countries: United States
- Max. length: 4 mi (6.4 km)
- Max. width: 0.4 mi (0.64 km)
- Surface area: 1,250 acres (510 ha)
- Average depth: 10 ft (3.0 m)
- Shore length^{1}: 26.8 miles (43.1 km)
- Surface elevation: 571 ft (174 m)
- ^{1} Shore length is not a well-defined measure.

Lake Glenn Shoals is a 1,250-acre (510 ha) reservoir located in Montgomery County, Illinois. Created in 1976 by damming the Middle Fork of Illinois's Shoal Creek, it was built for recreation, sport fishing, and water supply purposes. The lake is 4 miles (6.4 km) long and 0.4 miles (0.64 km) wide. The nearest town is Hillsboro, Illinois, south of Springfield, Illinois and northeast of Saint Louis, Missouri.

Lake Glenn Shoals is managed for bass, bluegill, catfish, crappie, and tiger muskie. The lake is managed in two halves, north and south of the Irving Township bridge, with boats able to go as fast as 35 miles per hour (56 km/h) south of the bridge but only 5 miles per hour (8.0 km/h) north of the structure. The nearest interstate highway exit is Exit 52 on Interstate 55, near Litchfield.

The Illinois Environmental Protection Agency classified Lake Glenn Shoals in April 2006 as an "impaired" lake, due largely to the large quantities of phosphorus, suspended silt, and algae in the lake. These findings could be connected to the significant use of the lake's drainage catchment area by commercial farmers.

The municipality of Hillsboro operates the lake and keeps it stocked with fish. A city permit is required for boaters seeking to use the lake.
