= East Fork Township, North Dakota =

East Fork Township may refer to the following townships in the U.S. state of North Dakota:

- East Fork Township, Benson County, North Dakota
- East Fork Township, Williams County, North Dakota

See also

- East Fork Township (disambiguation)
