= Butler, Illinois =

- Village
- Location in Montgomery County, Illinois
- Coordinates: 39°11′51″N 89°31′56″W
- Country: United States
- State: Illinois
- County: Montgomery
- Township: Butler Grove

Area
  - Total: 0.59 sq mi (1.54 km^{2})
  - Land: 0.59 sq mi (1.54 km^{2})
  - Water: 0 sq mi (0.00 km^{2})
- Elevation: 650 ft (200 m)

Population (2020)
  - Total: 164
  - Density: 275.2/sq mi (106.27/km^{2})
- Time zone: UTC-6 (CST)
  - Summer (DST): UTC-5 (CDT)
- ZIP Code: 62015
- Area code: 217
- FIPS code: 17-10149
- GNIS feature ID: 2397512

Butler is a small village in Montgomery County, Illinois, United States. The population was 164 at the 2020 census.

== Geography ==
Butler is in central Montgomery County, along Illinois Route 127, which runs along the east edge of the village center. IL 127 leads southeast 4 miles (6 km) to Hillsboro, the county seat, and north-northwest 8 miles (13 km) to Raymond.

According to the U.S. Census Bureau, Butler has a total area of 0.60 square miles (1.55 km^{2}), all land. The village drains east to Cress Creek, a south-flowing tributary of the Middle Fork of Shoal Creek, and west to Brush Creek, a south-flowing tributary of the West Fork of Shoal Creek. Shoal Creek is a south-flowing tributary of the Kaskaskia River.

== Demographics ==
Historical population
Census	Pop.	Note	%±
1870	1,648		—
1880	387		−76.5%
1890	311		−19.6%
1900	292		−6.1%
1910	233		−20.2%
1920	275		18.0%
1930	250		−9.1%
1940	246		−1.6%
1950	283		15.0%
1960	249		−12.0%
1970	233		−6.4%
1980	225		−3.4%
1990	156		−30.7%
2000	197		26.3%
2010	180		−8.6%
2020	164		−8.9%
U.S. Decennial Census

As of the census of 2000, there were 197 people, 77 households, and 50 families residing in the village. The population density was 345.7 inhabitants per square mile (133.5/km^{2}). There were 84 housing units at an average density of 147.4 per square mile (56.9/km^{2}). The racial makeup of the village was 99.49% White and 0.51% African American.

There were 77 households, out of which 29.9% had children under the age of 18 living with them, 53.2% were married couples living together, 9.1% had a female householder with no husband present, and 33.8% were non-families. 31.2% of all households were made up of individuals, and 18.2% had individuals living alone who were 65 years of age or older. The average household size was 2.56 and the average family size was 3.20.

In the village, the population was spread out, with 28.4% under the age of 18, 6.1% from 18 to 24, 29.9% from 25 to 44, 18.8% from 45 to 64, and 16.8% who were 65 years of age or older. The median age was 35 years. For every 100 females, there were 87.6 males. For every 100 females age 18 and over, there were 85.5 males.

The median income for a household in the village was $31,364, and the median income for a family was $32,500. Males had a median income of $27,500 versus $15,417 for females. The per capita income for the village was $11,081. About 17.2% of families and 17.5% of the population were below the poverty line, including 5.8% of those under the age of 18 and 27.1% of those 65 or over.

== Protected areas ==
Butler is the northwestern end of the Arches Rail Trail, a 3-mile (5 km) trail that connects Butler with nearby Hillsboro.
