= Arches Rail Trail =

Illinois 4.8km trail

Coordinates: 39.1998°N 89.5259°W

The Arches Rail Trail is a 3.0-mile (4.8 km) rail trail from Hillsboro, Illinois to Butler, Illinois in Butler Grove Township in central Montgomery County.

The trail occupies part of what was the Terre Haute & Alton, an 1850s railroad built to connect the state of Indiana with the Mississippi River port of Alton. After a numerous series of mergers and consolidations, the trackage eventually became part of the New York Central system before being completely abandoned in the late 1960s. A three-mile section of the former railroad track was acquired by a local citizen, Conrad Kee, who is credited with saving the right-of-way for future trail use. Montgomery County purchased the linear property from Kee in 2007.

== Current status ==
After redevelopment, the trail was reopened to the public in October 2012. It was named "Arches Rail Trail" in honor of two bridges, built of cut limestone by stonemasons in the 1850s, that carried the railroad over tributary creeks of the Kaskaskia River. The trail is maintained by the Montgomery County Natural Area Guardians.

As of the 2010s the trail right-of-way has been out of commercial use for half a century, and woodland life has been allowed to regrow. The soil on both sides of the trail is sandy and well-drained, with water not far down for trees with tap roots. A canopy of tall trees, including black walnuts, arches over the trail.
