= Staunton Township, Macoupin County, Illinois =

Staunton Township
- Township

- Location of Illinois in the United States
- Coordinates: 39°1′N 89°45′W
- Country: United States
- State: Illinois
- County: Macoupin
- Settled: November 1, 1870

Area
  - Total: 18.26 sq mi (47.3 km^{2})
  - Land: 18.12 sq mi (46.9 km^{2})
  - Water: 0.14 sq mi (0.36 km^{2}) 0.77%
- Elevation: 640 ft (200 m)

Population (2020)
  - Total: 5,526
  - Density: 305.0/sq mi (117.7/km^{2})
- Time zone: UTC-6 (CST)
  - Summer (DST): UTC-5 (CDT)
- FIPS code: 17-117-72416

Staunton Township (S1/2 T7N R6W) is located in Macoupin County, Illinois, United States. As of the 2020 census, its population was 5,526 and it contained 2,595 housing units.

== Geography ==
According to the 2021 census gazetteer files, Staunton Township has a total area of 18.26 square miles (47.29 km^{2}), of which 18.12 square miles (46.93 km^{2}) (or 99.23%) is land and 0.14 square miles (0.36 km^{2}) (or 0.77%) is water.

== Demographics ==
As of the 2020 census there were 5,526 people, 2,390 households, and 1,353 families residing in the township. The population density was 302.66 inhabitants per square mile (116.86/km^{2}). There were 2,595 housing units at an average density of 142.13 per square mile (54.88/km^{2}). The racial makeup of the township was 93.67% White, 0.29% African American, 0.22% Native American, 0.45% Asian, 0.00% Pacific Islander, 0.31% from other races, and 5.07% from two or more races. Hispanic or Latino of any race were 1.79% of the population.

There were 2,390 households, out of which 27.90% had children under the age of 18 living with them, 40.84% were married couples living together, 11.26% had a female householder with no spouse present, and 43.39% were non-families. 30.20% of all households were made up of individuals, and 16.70% had someone living alone who was 65 years of age or older. The average household size was 2.28 and the average family size was 2.93.

According to the 2020 American Community Survey, township's age distribution consisted of 19.7% under the age of 18, 9.6% from 18 to 24, 22.3% from 25 to 44, 31.1% from 45 to 64, and 17.3% who were 65 years of age or older. The median age was 44.1 years. For every 100 females, there were 92 males. For every 100 females age 18 and over, there were 89.7 males.

The median income for a household in the township was $52,746, and the median income for a family was $64,792. Males had a median income of $39,574 versus $28,390 for females. The per capita income for the township was $28,157. About 7.7% of families and 14.4% of the population were below the poverty line, including 18.2% of those under age 18 and 5.7% of those age 65 or over.

Historical population
Census	Pop.	Note	%±
2000	5,731		—
2010	5,795		1.1%
2020	5,526		−4.6%
U.S. Decennial Census

== Adjacent townships ==
- Mount Olive Township (north)
- Walshville Township, Montgomery County (east)
- New Douglas Township, Madison County (southeast)
- Olive Township, Madison County (south)
- Dorchester Township (west)
