= Jesse J. Phillips =

American judge

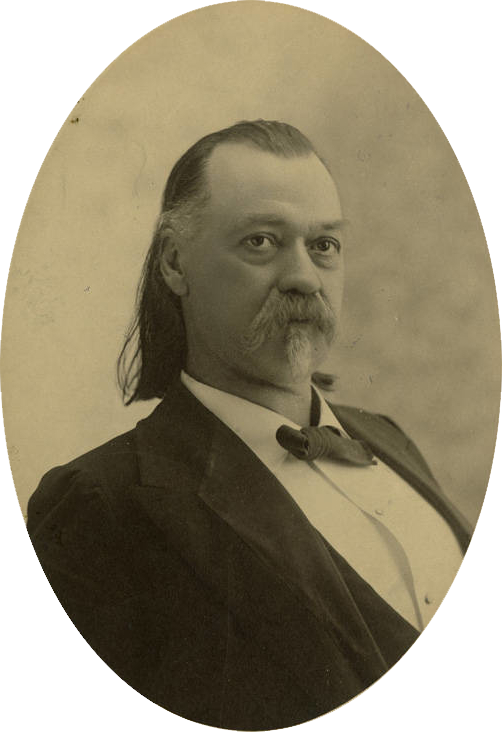

Justice of the Illinois Supreme Court
- In office 1893 – February 16, 1901

Personal details
- Born: February 22, 1837 Montgomery County, Illinois, U.S.
- Died: February 16, 1901 (aged 63) Hillsboro, Illinois, U.S.
- Occupation: Jurist, military officer

Jesse J. Phillips (February 22, 1837 – February 16, 1901) was an American jurist and military officer.

== Biography ==
Born in Montgomery County, Illinois, Phillips served in the 9th Illinois Volunteer Infantry Regiment during the American Civil War and was brevetted brigadier general. In 1879, Phillips was elected an Illinois circuit court judge. He served on the Illinois Supreme Court from 1893 until his death in 1901 and was chief justice in 1897. Phillips died at his home in Hillsboro, Illinois.

Party political offices
Preceded by Alexander Starne	Democratic nominee for Illinois Treasurer; 1866, 1868	Succeeded by Charles Ridgely
