= John R. Challacombe =

American businessman and politician

John Robert Challacombe (sometime in the 19th century – January 6, 1935) was an American businessman and politician.

Challacombe was born on a farm in Macoupin County, Illinois. He went to the Alton, Illinois public schools and to McKendree College. Challacombe lived in Hillsboro, Illinois and was involved in the grain, implement, and hardware businesses. He was also involved with the banking and steel businesses. Challacombe also owned a ranch in Oakwood, Texas. Challacombe served on the Hillsboro City Council and the Montgomery County Board. Challacombe served in the Illinois House of Representatives in 1895 and 1896 and was a Republican. Challacombe died at his home in Hillsboro, Illinois after being ill for several months.
