= Rountree Township, Montgomery County, Illinois =

Rountree Township
- Township
- Location of Illinois in the United States
- Coordinates: 39°18′N 89°25′W
- Country: United States
- State: Illinois
- County: Montgomery
- Settled: November 5, 1872

Area
  - Total: 35.81 sq mi (92.7 km^{2})
  - Land: 35.81 sq mi (92.7 km^{2})
  - Water: 0 sq mi (0 km^{2})
- Elevation: 636 ft (194 m)

Population (2010)
  - Estimate (2016): 230
  - Density: 6.7/sq mi (2.6/km^{2})
- Time zone: UTC-6 (CST)
  - Summer (DST): UTC-5 (CDT)
- FIPS code: 17-135-66092

Rountree Township (T10N R3W) is located in Montgomery County, Illinois, United States. As of the 2010 census, its population was 240 and it contained 111 housing units.

According to the 2010 census, the township has a total area of 35.81 square miles (92.7 km^{2}), all land.

Historical population
Census	Pop.	Note	%±
2016 (est.)	230
U.S. Decennial Census

== Adjacent townships ==
- Ricks Township, Christian County (north)
- Greenwood Township, Christian County (northeast)
- Nokomis Township (east)
- Witt Township (southeast)
- Irving Township (south)
- Butler Grove Township (southwest)
- Raymond Township (west)
- King Township, Christian County (northwest)
