= Mount Olive Township =

Mount Olive Township may refer to the following townships in the United States:

- Mount Olive Township, New Jersey
- Mount Olive Township, Macoupin County, Illinois
