= Raymond Township, Montgomery County, Illinois =

Raymond Township
- Township
- Location of Illinois in the United States
- Coordinates: 39°18′N 89°32′W
- Country: United States
- State: Illinois
- County: Montgomery
- Settled: November 5, 1872

Area
  - Total: 36.11 sq mi (93.5 km^{2})
  - Land: 36.06 sq mi (93.4 km^{2})
  - Water: 0.05 sq mi (0.13 km^{2})
- Elevation: 636 ft (194 m)

Population (2010)
  - Estimate (2016): 1,151
  - Density: 33.3/sq mi (12.9/km^{2})
- Time zone: UTC-6 (CST)
  - Summer (DST): UTC-5 (CDT)
- FIPS code: 17-135-62978

Raymond Township (T10N R4W) is located in Montgomery County, Illinois, United States. As of the 2010 census, its population was 1,200 and it contained 545 housing units.

== Geography ==
According to the 2010 census, the township has a total area of 36.11 square miles (93.5 km^{2}), of which 36.06 square miles (93.4 km^{2}) (or 99.86%) is land and 0.05 square miles (0.13 km^{2}) (or 0.14%) is water.

== Demographics ==
Historical population
Census	Pop.	Note	%±
2016 (est.)	1,151
U.S. Decennial Census

== Adjacent townships ==
- Harvel Township (north)
- King Township, Christian County (north)
- Ricks Township, Christian County (northeast)
- Rountree Township (east)
- Irving Township (southeast)
- Butler Grove Township (south)
- North Litchfield Township (southwest)
- Zanesville Township, Montgomery County (west)
- Pitman Township (northwest)
