= Lake Lou Yaeger =

- Location within Illinois Location within the United States
- Location: Montgomery County, Illinois
- Coordinates: 39°13′49″N 89°36′15″W
- Type: reservoir
- Primary inflows: Shoal Creek
- Primary outflows: Shoal Creek
- Basin countries: United States
- Max. length: 8 mi (13 km)
- Max. width: 0.5 mi (0.80 km)
- Surface area: 1,300 acres (530 ha)
- Surface elevation: 590 ft (180 m)

Lake Lou Yaeger is a 1,300-acre (530 ha) reservoir located in Montgomery County, Illinois. Created by damming the West Fork of Illinois's Shoal Creek, it was built for recreation, sport fishing, and flood control purposes. The lake is 8 miles (13 km) long and 0.5 miles (0.80 km) wide. The nearest town is Litchfield, Illinois (7 miles). The lake is south of Springfield, Illinois (41 miles) and north of St. Louis, Missouri (61 miles).

Lake Lou Yaeger is managed for bass, bluegill, catfish, and crappie. The fish yield is enjoyed by many species; bald eagles began to nest at the lake in 2005. Boaters enjoy the absence of both speed and power limits such as are enforced on many other lakes in central and southern Illinois. Visitors to the lake often arrive by means of Interstate 55, which closely approaches the lake north of Litchfield.

The municipality of Litchfield operates the lake's largest park, the 266-acre (108 ha) Shoal Creek Conservation Area. The park contains patches of oak-hickory woodland and some patches of prairie, locally called prairie "barrens." There are 1.15 miles (1.85 km) of trails for foot, bike, or horse use. The total number of acres reserved for recreation and conservation surrounding the lake is 4,641.
