= Schram City, Illinois =

- Village
- Location in Montgomery County, Illinois
- Coordinates: 39°09′34″N 89°28′01″W
- Country: United States
- State: Illinois
- County: Montgomery
- Township: East Fork

Area
  - Total: 0.67 sq mi (1.74 km^{2})
  - Land: 0.67 sq mi (1.74 km^{2})
  - Water: 0 sq mi (0.00 km^{2})
- Elevation: 627 ft (191 m)

Population (2020)
  - Total: 563
  - Density: 840/sq mi (323/km^{2})
- Time zone: UTC-6 (CST)
  - Summer (DST): UTC-5 (CDT)
- ZIP code: 62049 (Hillsboro)
- Area code: 217
- FIPS code: 17-68120
- GNIS feature ID: 2399772

Schram City is a village in Montgomery County, Illinois, United States. The population was 563 at the 2020 census.

== Geography ==
Schram City is in central Montgomery County and is bordered to the north, west, and south by the city of Hillsboro, the county seat. Illinois Route 16 passes through the village, leading west 2 miles (3 km) to the center of Hillsboro and northeast 14 miles (23 km) to Nokomis.

According to the U.S. Census Bureau, Schram City has a total area of 0.67 square miles (1.74 km^{2}), all land. The village is drained by northwest-flowing tributaries of the Middle Fork of Shoal Creek, part of the Kaskaskia River watershed. Lake Hillsboro, a reservoir on one of the unnamed tributaries, is just north of the village limits.

== Demographics ==
Historical population
Census	Pop.	Note	%±
1910	516		—
1920	1,200		132.6%
1930	867		−27.7%
1940	836		−3.6%
1950	793		−5.1%
1960	698		−12.0%
1970	657		−5.9%
1980	708		7.8%
1990	692		−2.3%
2000	653		−5.6%
2010	586		−10.3%
2020	563		−3.9%
U.S. Decennial Census

As of the census of 2000, there were 700 people, 263 households, and 188 families residing in the village. The population density was 891.1 inhabitants per square mile (344.1/km^{2}). There were 287 housing units at an average density of 391.7 per square mile (151.2/km^{2}). The racial makeup of the village was 99.08% White, 0.46% African American, 0.15% Native American, 0.15% Asian, and 0.15% from two or more races. Hispanic or Latino of any race were 0.31% of the population.

There were 263 households, out of which 33.1% had children under the age of 18 living with them, 54.0% were married couples living together, 13.3% had a female householder with no husband present, and 28.5% were non-families. 26.2% of all households were made up of individuals, and 15.2% had someone living alone who was 65 years of age or older. The average household size was 2.46 and the average family size was 2.91.

In the village, the population was spread out, with 24.3% under the age of 18, 8.0% from 18 to 24, 28.0% from 25 to 44, 22.8% from 45 to 64, and 16.8% who were 65 years of age or older. The median age was 39 years. For every 100 females, there were 98.5 males. For every 100 females age 18 and over, there were 97.6 males.

The median income for a household in the village was $33,750, and the median income for a family was $41,500. Males had a median income of $31,667 versus $20,625 for females. The per capita income for the village was $16,994. About 4.9% of families and 7.9% of the population were below the poverty line, including 7.1% of those under age 18 and 12.0% of those age 65 or over.
