= Demetris Th. Gotsis =

Greek poet and author residing in Cyprus (born 1945 - died 2021)

Demetris Th. Gotsis (Greek: Δημήτρης Θ. Γκότσης; October 26, 1945 — April 21, 2021) was a Greek poet and author residing in Cyprus. He studied medicine at the Aristotle University of Thessaloniki and received musical education since his parents were trained opera singers.

== Background ==
He specialized in Germany, where he worked for several years. His first collection of poetry was published when he was already 44. Since 1986, he has been living in Paphos, Cyprus. Lyrics of Gotsis were compiled in French, English, German, Spanish and Finnish Anthologies. Also, poems of Gotsis originally written in German, have been published in anthologies in Munich and in Kiel. He was awarded the second prize for Poetry of the Republic of Cyprus in 1995 and the first prize at the International Competition for Poetry of "Griechisch Kunst - und Literatur-Verein" in Munich, Germany in 2002. He is a founding member of the Paphos' Society of Littérateurs, a member of the Cyprus' Union of Littérateurs, member of PEN Club-Cyprus and of the Association Internationale des Critiques Litéraires.

== Works ==
=== Poetry ===
- The Yoke's Rod (Έστωρ, Nicosia, 1989).
- Vestments (Ιμάτια, Nicosia, 1990).
- Songs of Theodore Oesten (Του Έστεν τα τραγούδια), Children's poetry for Oesten's music in Greek, Nicosia, 1991.
- ... and highland is the Garden (...και Ορεινός ο Κήπος, Nicosia, 1992).
- Yard of Easter, Songs for the Imprisoned Graves (Αυλή του Πάσχα, Άσματα για τα Φυλακισμένα Μνήματα), foreword by Takis Varvitsiotis, Nicosia, 1994). Prize for Poetry of the Republic of Cyprus, 1995.
- The Journey's Ends (Ταξιδίου Τέρματα, Nicosia, 1998).
- About the Darkness (Της Ευφρόνης, Nicosia, 2001).
- Concentric in Three Persons (Ομόκεντρον σε Τρία Πρόσωπα, Nicosia, 2003).
- Traveling with Malte (Ταξιδεύοντας με τον Μάλτε, Athens, Armos 2006).

=== Essays ===
- Essays about Dionysios Solomos, Andreas Kalvos, Konstantinos Kavafis, Giorgos Seferis, Demetris P. Papaditsas, Christos Malevitsis, Nikiphoros Vrettakos, Takis Varvitsiotis etc.

=== Theatre ===
- "Macedonian Women", Imitation of Old Greek Drama, 1991, performed in the Radio of Cyprus Broadcasting Corporation.

=== Translations ===
Ιnto Greek:

- Rainer Maria Rilke, "The Sonnets to Orpheus" -together with Andreas Petrides- (Τα Σονέττα στον Ορφέα, Nicosia, 1995) and "The Elegies of Duino", (Οι Ελεγείες του Ντουίνο, Athens, Armos , 2000).
- Friedrich Hölderlin, "Poems, large selection in three parts", (Ποιήματα, Μεγάλη Εκλογή σε Τρία Μέρη, Athens, Armos 2002).
- He has also translated other German and Austrian poets like: Johannes Bobrowski, Nelly Sachs, Peter Huchel, Joachim Ringelnatz, Sarah Kirsch, Ingeborg Bachmann, Ilse Aichinger, Georg Trakl, Stefan George.

=== Music ===
- Foreign Works for Chorus with Greek verse, (Ξένα Χορωδιακά Έργα με ελληνικό κείμενο), foreword by Antonis Kontogeorgiou, Hellenic Republic, Ministry of Culture, Centre for Choruses, editions Papagregoriou-Nakas , Athens, 1999.
