= Honey Point Township, Macoupin County, Illinois =

Honey Point Township
- Township

- Location of Illinois in the United States
- Coordinates: 39°13′N 89°45′W
- Country: United States
- State: Illinois
- County: Macoupin
- Settled: November 1, 1870

Area
  - Total: 37.03 sq mi (95.9 km^{2})
  - Land: 37.02 sq mi (95.9 km^{2})
  - Water: 0.01 sq mi (0.026 km^{2}) 0.02%
- Elevation: 663 ft (202 m)

Population (2020)
  - Total: 227
  - Density: 6.13/sq mi (2.37/km^{2})
- Time zone: UTC-6 (CST)
  - Summer (DST): UTC-5 (CDT)
- FIPS code: 17-117-35996

Honey Point Township (T9N R6W) is located in Macoupin County, Illinois, United States. As of the 2020 census, its population was 227 and it contained 77 housing units.

== Geography ==
According to the 2021 census gazetteer files, Honey Point Township has a total area of 37.03 square miles (95.91 km^{2}), of which 37.02 square miles (95.88 km^{2}) (or 99.98%) is land and 0.01 square miles (0.03 km^{2}) (or 0.02%) is water.

== Demographics ==
As of the 2020 census there were 227 people, 106 households, and 93 families residing in the township. The population density was 6.13 inhabitants per square mile (2.37/km^{2}). There were 77 housing units at an average density of 2.08 per square mile (0.80/km^{2}). The racial makeup of the township was 86.34% White, 1.32% African American, 0.44% Native American, 1.32% Asian, 0.00% Pacific Islander, 1.76% from other races, and 8.81% from two or more races. Hispanic or Latino of any race were 2.64% of the population.

There were 106 households, out of which 50.90% had children under the age of 18 living with them, 87.74% were married couples living together, 0.00% had a female householder with no spouse present, and 12.26% were non-families. 12.30% of all households were made up of individuals, and 0.00% had someone living alone who was 65 years of age or older. The average household size was 3.19 and the average family size was 3.49.

According to the 2020 American Community Survey, township's age distribution consisted of 31.7% under the age of 18, 7.7% from 18 to 24, 35.8% from 25 to 44, 24.9% from 45 to 64, and 0.0% who were 65 years of age or older. The median age was 38.5 years. For every 100 females, there were 104.5 males. For every 100 females age 18 and over, there were 101.1 males.

The median income for a household in the township was $145,972, and the median income for a family was $146,875. Males had a median income of $54,750 versus $73,750 for females. The per capita income for the township was $47,491. None of the population was below the poverty line.

Historical population
Census	Pop.	Note	%±
2000	225		—
2010	155		−31.1%
2020	227		46.5%
U.S. Decennial Census

== Adjacent townships ==
- Shaws Point Township (north)
- Zanesville Township, Montgomery County (northeast)
- North Litchfield Township, Montgomery County (east)
- South Litchfield Township, Montgomery County (southeast)
- Cahokia Township (south)
- Gillespie Township (southwest)
- Brushy Mound Township (west)
- Carlinville Township (northwest)
