= Max Oesten =

German musician (1843–1917)

Max Oesten (var: Otto Max Oesten, Max Otto Östen, Otto Östen) 1843–1917, was a German pianist, organist and prolific composer.

== Life ==
Max Oesten was born in Berlin the son of the German composer Theodore Oesten. He spent most of his professional life as a church organist in Königsburg. Oesten was a pupil of August Wilhelm Bach. Among Oesten's pupils was the German-American fiddler Otto Funk.

== List of works ==
=== Choral ===
- op. ? (1879) Aufforderung zum Tanz: polka-rondo (mixed choir and piano).
- op. 151 (c.1887) Drei Lieder Songs for Male-voice choir: 'Frühlingsahnung', 'Waldeseinsamkeit', 'Fröhliche Fahrt'.
- op. 225 (1914) Für Kaiser und Reich (male-voice choir and orchestra).

=== Harmonium and/or Organ ===
- op. 26 (n.d.) Trauermarsch (after Beethoven op. 26) arr. for harmonium/organ.
- op. 196 (1897) Twelve easy voluntaries: second set (harmonium/organ).
- op. 205 (1899) Festival times: ten short and easy pieces (harmonium/organ).
- op. ? (1899) Twelve Select voluntaries (harmonium/organ).
- op. 215 (1902) Twelve short voluntaries: third set (harmonium/organ).

=== Harmonium and/or piano ===
- op. 131 (1885) [Schubert] Lieder ... concertmässig als Duos (harmonium and piano).
- op. 135 (1885) Lieder der Heimat: fanntasien über beliebte Volksweisen (harmonium and piano).
- op. 138 (1886-7) Die Oper am Harmonium. Fantasien über beliebte Opern (harmonium, and piano; two pianos).
- op. 140 Träume am Harmonium (harmonium).
- op. 141 (1887) Leichte Original-Duos (harmonium and piano; two pianos).
- op. 222 (n.d.) Klänge am Harmonium: 50 geistliche Lieder und Gesänge (harmonium).

=== Harp ===
- op. ? (n.d.) Largo (from 'Serse' by Handel) arr, for harp, harmonium and piano/organ.

=== Piano ===
- op. ? (1869) Felice Notte (piano).
- op. ? (1869) La Belle Espagnole (piano).
- op. ? (1869) Champagne Pearls, morceau de salon (piano).
- op. ? (1870) Abendglockenklänge (piano).
- op. ? (1870) Accents du Cœur/Herzensklänge: nocturne (piano).
- op. ? (1870) Melodiengrüsse: kleine Fantasien über beliebte Volkslieder (piano).
- op. ? (1870) Féodora: polka-mazurka (piano).
- op. ? (1870) La Jolie Vivandière. Die hübsche Marketenderin (piano).
- op. ? (1870) Langage des Fleurs: rêverie (piano).
- op. ? (1870) Leontine: nocturne (piano).
- op. ? (1872) Ma Tourterelle: mélodie (piano)
- op. ? (1873) Bluebells (piano).
- op. ? (1873) Spielmanns Gruss: romanze (piano).
- op. ? (1874) Accents du Cœur (piano).
- op. ? (1874) Evening Bells (piano).
- op. 40 (n.d.) Schweizerbilder: im leichteren Salonstyl (piano).
- op. 45 (n.d.) Mein Stern (piano)
- op. 71 (1878) Frühlingsglaube, after F. Ries (piano).
- op. 77 (1878) Schlusslied (piano).
- op. 124 (1887) Elfengeflüster: characterstück (piano).
- op. 126 (1884) Weihnachtsidyll: tonbild (piano).
- op. 128 (1885) Glockenthürmers Töchterlein (piano: four hamds).
- op. 129 (1885) Sommerfäden (piano: four hands).
- op. 130 (1887) Abendgebet (violin, 'cello, piano and harmonium/organ)
- op. 168 (1890) Weihnachtsklänge (piano)

=== Solo strings ===
- op. 142 (1885) Stunden der Weihe. (Six pieces for violin/'cello and harmonium/organ/piano).
- op. ? (1898) Six easy pieces (violin and piano).
- op. 201 (1899) Six easy pieces: second set) (violin and piano).
