= Cahokia Township, Macoupin County, Illinois =

Cahokia Township
- Township

- Location of Illinois in the United States
- Coordinates: 39°8′N 89°45′W
- Country: United States
- State: Illinois
- County: Macoupin
- Settled: November 1, 1870

Area
  - Total: 36.88 sq mi (95.5 km^{2})
  - Land: 36.61 sq mi (94.8 km^{2})
  - Water: 0.27 sq mi (0.70 km^{2}) 0.74%
- Elevation: 650 ft (200 m)

Population (2020)
  - Total: 3,151
  - Density: 86.07/sq mi (33.23/km^{2})
- Time zone: UTC-6 (CST)
  - Summer (DST): UTC-5 (CDT)
- FIPS code: 17-117-10357

Cahokia Township (T8N R6W) is located in Macoupin County, Illinois, United States. As of the 2020 census, its population was 3,151 and it contained 1,519 housing units.

== Geography ==
According to the 2021 census gazetteer files, Cahokia Township has a total area of 36.88 square miles (95.52 km^{2}), of which 36.61 square miles (94.82 km^{2}) (or 99.26%) is land and 0.27 square miles (0.70 km^{2}) (or 0.74%) is water.

== Demographics ==
As of the 2020 census there were 3,151 people, 1,367 households, and 859 families residing in the township. The population density was 85.44 inhabitants per square mile (32.99/km^{2}). There were 1,519 housing units at an average density of 41.19 per square mile (15.90/km^{2}). The racial makeup of the township was 93.21% White, 0.32% African American, 0.35% Native American, 0.16% Asian, 0.00% Pacific Islander, 0.16% from other races, and 5.81% from two or more races. Hispanic or Latino of any race were 1.65% of the population.

There were 1,367 households, out of which 27.10% had children under the age of 18 living with them, 48.79% were married couples living together, 9.51% had a female householder with no spouse present, and 37.16% were non-families. 32.30% of all households were made up of individuals, and 9.60% had someone living alone who was 65 years of age or older. The average household size was 2.31 and the average family size was 2.92.

According to the 2020 American Community Survey, township's age distribution consisted of 19.6% under the age of 18, 7.2% from 18 to 24, 23% from 25 to 44, 32.1% from 45 to 64, and 18.1% who were 65 years of age or older. The median age was 45.1 years. For every 100 females, there were 105.8 males. For every 100 females age 18 and over, there were 99.2 males.

The median income for a household in the township was $45,163, and the median income for a family was $62,938. Males had a median income of $38,646 versus $23,636 for females. The per capita income for the township was $24,572. About 10.2% of families and 20.3% of the population were below the poverty line, including 30.3% of those under age 18 and 5.9% of those age 65 or over.

Historical population
Census	Pop.	Note	%±
2000	3,389		—
2010	3,378		−0.3%
2020	3,151		−6.7%
U.S. Decennial Census

== Adjacent townships ==
- Honey Point Township (north)
- North Litchfield Township, Montgomery County (northeast)
- South Litchfield Township, Montgomery County (east)
- Walshville Township, Montgomery County (southeast)
- Mount Olive Township (south)
- Dorchester Township (southwest)
- Gillespie Township (west)
- Brushy Mound Township (northwest)
