= Ohlman, Illinois =

- Village
- Location in Montgomery County, Illinois
- Coordinates: 39°20′36″N 89°13′07″W
- Country: United States
- State: Illinois
- County: Montgomery
- Township: Audubon

Area
  - Total: 0.32 sq mi (0.83 km^{2})
  - Land: 0.32 sq mi (0.83 km^{2})
  - Water: 0 sq mi (0.00 km^{2})
- Elevation: 686 ft (209 m)

Population (2020)
  - Total: 109
  - Density: 339.6/sq mi (131.12/km^{2})
- Time zone: UTC-6 (CST)
  - Summer (DST): UTC-5 (CDT)
- ZIP code: 62076
- Area code: 217
- FIPS code: 17-55418
- GNIS feature ID: 2399565

Ohlman is a village in Montgomery County, Illinois, United States. As of the 2020 census, the village had a population of 109, down from 135 in 2010.

== History ==
The village is named for Michael Ohlman, a Civil War captain of a Mississippi River steamboat. The settlement was located on the Chicago and Eastern Illinois Railroad.

== Geography ==
Ohlman is in northeastern Montgomery County and is bordered to the north by Christian County. Illinois Route 16 passes through the village, leading southwest 4.5 miles (7.2 km) to Nokomis and northeast 8 miles (13 km) to Pana. Hillsboro, the Montgomery county seat, is 21 miles (34 km) to the southwest via IL 16.

According to the U.S. Census Bureau, Ohlman has a total area of 0.32 square miles (0.83 km^{2}), all land.<"CenPopGazetteer2022"/> The village drains northwest toward the South Fork of the Sangamon River, a tributary of the Illinois River.

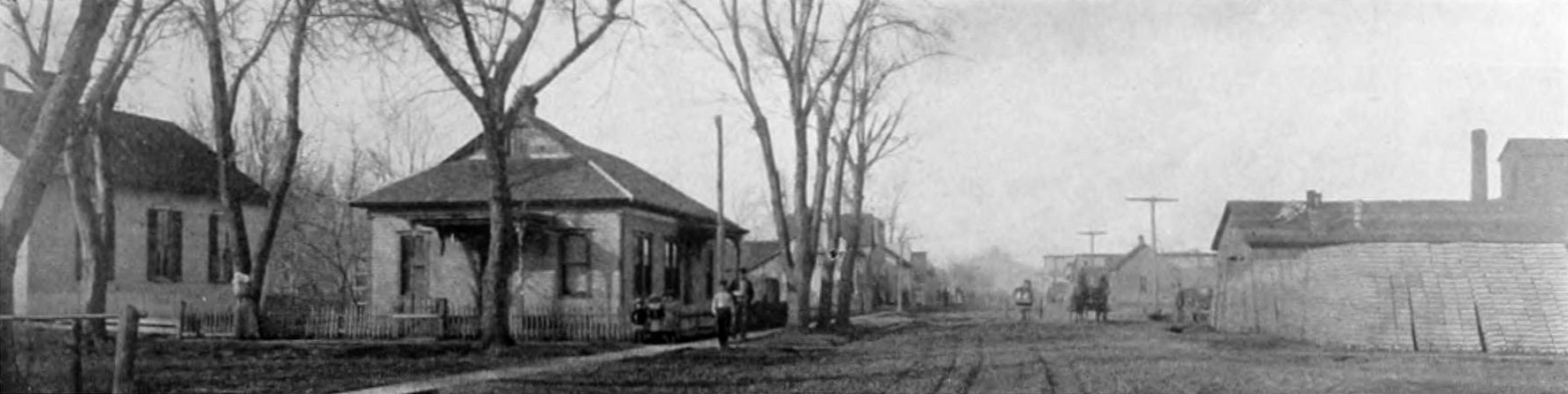
Ohlman, 1913

== Demographics ==
Historical population
Census	Pop.	Note	%±
1960	215		—
1970	193		−10.2%
1980	178		−7.8%
1990	82		−53.9%
2010	135		—
2020	109		−19.3%
U.S. Decennial Census

The census of 2000 showed there were no people living in the village; a recount in 2004 issued a revised population of 148.

== See also ==
- List of municipalities in Illinois
