= Grisham Township, Montgomery County, Illinois =

Grisham Township
- Township

- Location of Illinois in the United States
- Coordinates: 39°3′N 89°32′W
- Country: United States
- State: Illinois
- County: Montgomery
- Settled: Unknown

Area
  - Total: 24.4 sq mi (63 km^{2})
  - Land: 24.37 sq mi (63.1 km^{2})
  - Water: 0.03 sq mi (0.078 km^{2})
- Elevation: 577 ft (176 m)

Population (2010)
  - Estimate (2016): 603
  - Density: 25.8/sq mi (10.0/km^{2})
- Time zone: UTC-6 (CST)
  - Summer (DST): UTC-5 (CDT)
- FIPS code: 17-135-31836

Grisham Township (N2/3T7N R4W) is located in Montgomery County, Illinois, United States. As of the 2010 census, its population was 629 and it contained 318 housing units.

== Geography ==
According to the 2010 census, the township has a total area of 24.4 square miles (63 km^{2}), of which 24.37 square miles (63.1 km^{2}) (or 99.88%) is land and 0.03 square miles (0.078 km^{2}) (or 0.12%) is water.

== Demographics ==
Historical population
Census	Pop.	Note	%±
2016 (est.)	603
U.S. Decennial Census

== Adjacent townships ==
- Hillsboro Township (north)
- East Fork Township (northeast & east)
- La Grange Township, Bond County (southeast)
- Shoal Creek Township, Bond County (south)
- Walshville Township (west)
- South Litchfield Township (northwest)
