= Walshville Township, Montgomery County, Illinois =

Walshville Township
- Township

- Location of Illinois in the United States
- Coordinates: 39°3′N 89°38′W
- Country: United States
- State: Illinois
- County: Montgomery
- Settled: November 5, 1872

Area
  - Total: 36.78 sq mi (95.3 km^{2})
  - Land: 36.75 sq mi (95.2 km^{2})
  - Water: 0.02 sq mi (0.052 km^{2})
- Elevation: 620 ft (190 m)

Population (2010)
  - Estimate (2016): 332
  - Density: 9.4/sq mi (3.6/km^{2})
- Time zone: UTC-6 (CST)
  - Summer (DST): UTC-5 (CDT)
- FIPS code: 17-135-78669

Walshville Township (T7N R5W) is located in Montgomery County, Illinois, United States. As of the 2010 census, its population was 347 and it contained 162 housing units.

== Geography ==
According to the 2010 census, the township has a total area of 36.78 square miles (95.3 km^{2}), of which 36.75 square miles (95.2 km^{2}) (or 99.92%) is land and 0.02 square miles (0.052 km^{2}) (or 0.05%) is water.

Walshville Twp:

== Demographics ==
Historical population
Census	Pop.	Note	%±
2016 (est.)	332
U.S. Decennial Census

== Adjacent townships ==
- South Litchfield Township (north)
- Hillsboro Township (northeast)
- Grisham Township (east)
- Shoal Creek Township, Bond County (southeast)
- New Douglas Township, Madison County (south)
- Staunton Township, Macoupin County (west)
- Mount Olive Township, Macoupin County (west)
- Cahokia Township, Macoupin County (northwest)
