= Gillespie Township, Macoupin County, Illinois =

Gillespie Township
- Township

- Location of Illinois in the United States
- Coordinates: 39°8′N 89°52′W
- Country: United States
- State: Illinois
- County: Macoupin
- Settled: November 1, 1870

Area
  - Total: 36.16 sq mi (93.7 km^{2})
  - Land: 35.66 sq mi (92.4 km^{2})
  - Water: 0.51 sq mi (1.3 km^{2}) 1.40%
- Elevation: 650 ft (200 m)

Population (2020)
  - Total: 3,684
  - Density: 103.3/sq mi (39.89/km^{2})
- Time zone: UTC-6 (CST)
  - Summer (DST): UTC-5 (CDT)
- FIPS code: 17-117-29249

Gillespie Township is located in Macoupin County, Illinois, United States. As of the 2020 census, its population was 3,684 and it contained 1,823 housing units.

== History ==
Gillespie Township is named for Judge Joseph Gillespie.

== Geography ==
According to the 2021 census gazetteer files, Gillespie Township has a total area of 36.16 square miles (93.65 km^{2}), of which 35.66 square miles (92.36 km^{2}) (or 98.60%) is land and 0.51 square miles (1.32 km^{2}) (or 1.40%) is water.

== Demographics ==
As of the 2020 census there were 3,684 people, 1,559 households, and 1,102 families residing in the township. The population density was 101.87 inhabitants per square mile (39.33/km^{2}). There were 1,823 housing units at an average density of 50.41 per square mile (19.46/km^{2}). The racial makeup of the township was 94.76% White, 0.14% African American, 0.35% Native American, 0.43% Asian, 0.00% Pacific Islander, 0.19% from other races, and 4.13% from two or more races. Hispanic or Latino of any race were 0.81% of the population.

There were 1,559 households, out of which 27.10% had children under the age of 18 living with them, 47.79% were married couples living together, 18.35% had a female householder with no spouse present, and 29.31% were non-families. 24.90% of all households were made up of individuals, and 12.20% had someone living alone who was 65 years of age or older. The average household size was 2.30 and the average family size was 2.67.

According to the 2020 American Community Survey, township's age distribution consisted of 21.3% under the age of 18, 6.3% from 18 to 24, 23.1% from 25 to 44, 29.9% from 45 to 64, and 19.5% who were 65 years of age or older. The median age was 44.2 years. For every 100 females, there were 98.1 males. For every 100 females age 18 and over, there were 96 males.

The median income for a household in the township was $44,746, and the median income for a family was $54,667. Males had a median income of $44,199 versus $31,518 for females. The per capita income for the township was $28,385. About 16.0% of families and 17.7% of the population were below the poverty line, including 33.1% of those under age 18 and 10.1% of those age 65 or over.

Historical population
Census	Pop.	Note	%±
2000	4,114		—
2010	3,882		−5.6%
2020	3,684		−5.1%
U.S. Decennial Census

== Adjacent townships ==
- Brushy Mound Township (north)
- Honey Point Township (northeast)
- Cahokia Township (east)
- Mount Olive Township (southeast)
- Dorchester Township (south)
- Bunker Hill Township (southwest)
- Hillyard Township (west)
- Polk Township (northwest)
