= Otto Funk =

Background information
- Born: October 6, 1868; St. Louis, Missouri, United States
- Died: February 6, 1934 (aged 65) Hillsboro, Illinois, United States
- Genres: Classical; folk
- Occupations: Violinist, composer

Otto Funk (October 6, 1868 – February 6, 1934) was a German-American fiddler who gained fame as "the Walking Fiddler" in the Guinness Book of World Records for playing his Hopf violin every step of the way as he walked from New York to San Francisco in 1929, a trip of 4,165 miles. He was 61 years old at the time of his marathon walk. He stood five feet two inches tall, and weighed approximately 100 pounds.

In the era of roller derbies, 30-day dance contests and walkathons, Otto Funk's whimsical journey was an attempt to draw attention to his abilities as an old-time fiddler and durable walker. On April 29, 1928, he had been featured in a cover story in the St. Louis Globe-Democrat's rotogravure Magazine section (complete with a rare color photograph), and this publicity sparked his interest in making a national name for himself. His hope was that his fame might exceed that of his musical rival, the Austrian-American violinist Fritz Kreisler.

Funk's parents had migrated to America from West Prussia in the mid-19th century, and were married in Pilot Knob, Missouri in 1859. Following the ravishing of their 80-acre (320,000 m^{2}) family farm by Confederate soldiers, they moved to St. Louis, Missouri, where Otto (one of seven children) was born in 1868. In 1881, the family bought a 360-acre (1.5 km^{2}) farm in Montgomery County, Illinois, and relocated there.

Otto Funk's early musical training was in piano and violin. In his teens, he was sent by his parents to study with some of Germany's finest music teachers, including Max Brödl, Robert Goldbeck, and Max Oesten, the son of well-known German composer Theodore Oesten. Goldbeck was a particularly significant musical influence. Born and trained in Germany, he founded the St Louis College of Music in 1880, and subsequently moved to Königsberg at the time when Otto was studying there. Goldbeck moved back to St Louis in his later years, and died there in 1908. Otto Funk returned to the St. Louis area, after his studies in Königsberg, to perform as a concert violinist, and later re-located with his wife, the pianist Della Edwards, to the Funk family farm in Illinois. For many years, he managed a popular music and recreational venue known as “Funk’s Lake” in rural Montgomery County, having created a large fishing pond by digging out a cornfield with a mule and plow.

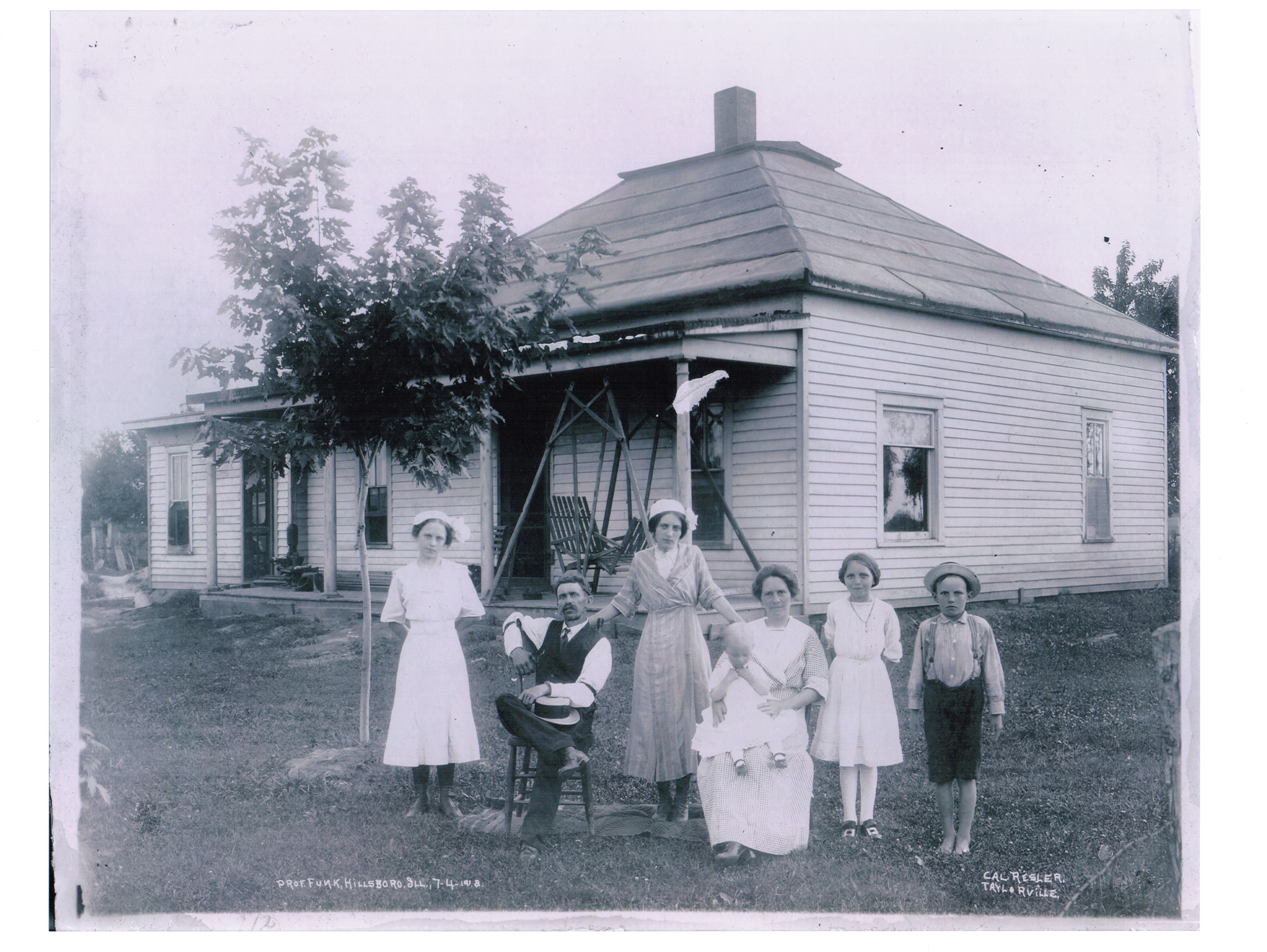
The Funk Family in Hillsboro, Illinois, 1912 - Myrtle (13), Otto (44), Viola (15), Della (35) with baby Clara Del (2), Rosa (12), and Benjamin (10). A sixth child, Otto Eugene, was born in 1916.

Otto Funk's cross-country trek began in New York on June 28, 1928, when he was seen off by Democratic presidential candidate Al Smith on the steps of City Hall. He reached San Francisco on July 25, 1929, where he was received by Mayor (and future California governor) James Rolph, together with the cameras of Fox Movietone News.

His journey had taken him 4,165 miles (6,703 km), and involved playing 142 theatre performances, hundreds of street concerts, and 18 live radio concerts. He wore out several dozen bows and twenty pairs of shoes (provided by one of his sponsors, the Brown Shoe Company). He was accompanied on his trip by his son-in-law, Lester Grundy, who drove behind in a Ford motor car that served as dressing room, storage facility and sleeping quarters.

Following Otto Funk's death in Hillsboro, Illinois at the age of 65, he was accorded the biggest funeral in the history of Montgomery County.

Otto Funk in Navajo Country, 1929

Otto Funk described his epic walk as follows: “I have seen God’s country, every foot of it that I walked over. You can’t see it right from a car or a train. Sole leather express is the only way.” His trip had taken him through America's Indian reservations, cities, small towns, forests, and deserts.
