= South Litchfield Township, Montgomery County, Illinois =

South Litchfield Township
- Township
- Location of Illinois in the United States
- Coordinates: 39°7′N 89°39′W
- Country: United States
- State: Illinois
- County: Montgomery
- Settled: November 5, 1872

Area
  - Total: 37.22 sq mi (96.4 km^{2})
  - Land: 37.15 sq mi (96.2 km^{2})
  - Water: 0.07 sq mi (0.18 km^{2})
- Elevation: 659 ft (201 m)

Population (2010)
  - Estimate (2016): 3,256
  - Density: 91.7/sq mi (35.4/km^{2})
- Time zone: UTC-6 (CST)
  - Summer (DST): UTC-5 (CDT)
- FIPS code: 17-135-70928

South Litchfield Township (T8N R5W) is located in Montgomery County, Illinois, United States. As of the 2010 census, its population was 3,408 and it contained 1,579 housing units.

== Geography ==
According to the 2010 census, the township has a total area of 37.22 square miles (96.4 km^{2}), of which 37.15 square miles (96.2 km^{2}) (or 99.81%) is land and 0.07 square miles (0.18 km^{2}) (or 0.19%) is water.

South Litchfield Twp:

== Demographics ==
Historical population
Census	Pop.	Note	%±
2016 (est.)	3,256
U.S. Decennial Census

== Adjacent townships ==
- North Litchfield Township (north)
- Butler Grove Township (northeast)
- Hillsboro Township (east)
- Grisham Township (southeast)
- Walshville Township (south)
- Mount Olive Township, Macoupin County (southwest)
- Cahokia Township, Macoupin County (west)
- Honey Point Township (northwest)
