= East Fork Township =

East Fork Township may refer to:

- East Fork Township, Faulkner County, Arkansas, in Faulkner County, Arkansas
- East Fork Township, Clinton County, Illinois
- East Fork Township, Montgomery County, Illinois
- East Fork Township, Haywood County, North Carolina
- East Fork Township, Benson County, North Dakota
- East Fork Township, Williams County, North Dakota, in Williams County, North Dakota
