= Zanesville Township, Montgomery County, Illinois =

Zanesville Township
- Township

- Location of Illinois in the United States
- Coordinates: 39°18′N 89°39′W
- Country: United States
- State: Illinois
- County: Montgomery
- Settled: November 5, 1872

Area
  - Total: 36.86 sq mi (95.5 km^{2})
  - Land: 36.66 sq mi (94.9 km^{2})
  - Water: 0.2 sq mi (0.52 km^{2})
- Elevation: 653 ft (199 m)

Population (2010)
  - Estimate (2016): 470
  - Density: 13.4/sq mi (5.2/km^{2})
- Time zone: UTC-6 (CST)
  - Summer (DST): UTC-5 (CDT)
- FIPS code: 17-135-84129

Zanesville Township (T10N R5W) is located in Montgomery County, Illinois. As of the 2010 census, its population was 491 and it contained 189 housing units.

== Geography ==
According to the 2010 census, the township has a total area of 36.86 square miles (95.5 km^{2}), of which 36.66 square miles (94.9 km^{2}) (or 99.46%) is land and 0.2 square miles (0.52 km^{2}) (or 0.54%) is water.

== Demographics ==
Historical population
Census	Pop.	Note	%±
2016 (est.)	470
U.S. Decennial Census

== Adjacent townships ==
- Pitman Township (north)
- Harvel Township (northeast)
- Raymond Township (east)
- Butler Grove Township (southeast)
- North Litchfield Township (south)
- Honey Point Township, Macoupin County (southwest)
- Shaws Point Township, Macoupin County (west)
- Nilwood Township, Macoupin County (northwest)
