= North Litchfield Township, Montgomery County, Illinois =

North Litchfield Township
- Township
- Location of Illinois in the United States
- Coordinates: 39°13′N 89°39′W
- Country: United States
- State: Illinois
- County: Montgomery
- Settled: November 5, 1872

Area
  - Total: 38.11 sq mi (98.7 km^{2})
  - Land: 36.11 sq mi (93.5 km^{2})
  - Water: 2 sq mi (5.2 km^{2})
- Elevation: 666 ft (203 m)

Population (2010)
  - Estimate (2016): 4,926
  - Density: 142.6/sq mi (55.1/km^{2})
- Time zone: UTC-6 (CST)
  - Summer (DST): UTC-5 (CDT)
- FIPS code: 17-135-53949

North Litchfield Township (T9N R5W) is located in Montgomery County, Illinois, United States. As of the 2010 census, its population was 5,148 and it contained 2,315 housing units.

== Geography ==
According to the 2010 census, the township has a total area of 38.11 square miles (98.7 km^{2}), of which 36.11 square miles (93.5 km^{2}) (or 94.75%) is land and 2 square miles (5.2 km^{2}) (or 5.25%) is water.

== Demographics ==
Historical population
Census	Pop.	Note	%±
2016 (est.)	4,926
U.S. Decennial Census

== Adjacent townships ==
- Zanesville Township, Montgomery County (north)
- Raymond Township, Montgomery County (northeast)
- Butler Grove Township (east)
- Hillsboro Township (southeast)
- South Litchfield Township (south)
- Cahokia Township, Macoupin County (southwest)
- Honey Point Township (west)
- Shaws Point Township (northwest)
