= Dorchester Township, Macoupin County, Illinois =

Dorchester Township
- Township

- Location of Illinois in the United States
- Coordinates: 39°2′N 89°52′W
- Country: United States
- State: Illinois
- County: Macoupin
- Settled: November 1, 1870

Area
  - Total: 36.11 sq mi (93.5 km^{2})
  - Land: 35.98 sq mi (93.2 km^{2})
  - Water: 0.13 sq mi (0.34 km^{2}) 0.37%
- Elevation: 620 ft (190 m)

Population (2020)
  - Total: 1,512
  - Density: 42.02/sq mi (16.23/km^{2})
- Time zone: UTC-6 (CST)
  - Summer (DST): UTC-5 (CDT)
- FIPS code: 17-117-20383

Dorchester Township (T7N R7W) is located in Macoupin County, Illinois, United States. As of the 2020 census, its population was 1,512 and it contained 667 housing units.

== Geography ==
According to the 2021 census gazetteer files, Dorchester Township has a total area of 36.11 square miles (93.52 km^{2}), of which 35.98 square miles (93.19 km^{2}) (or 99.63%) is land and 0.13 square miles (0.34 km^{2}) (or 0.37%) is water.

== Demographics ==
As of the 2020 census there were 1,512 people, 565 households, and 419 families residing in the township. The population density was 41.87 inhabitants per square mile (16.17/km^{2}). There were 667 housing units at an average density of 18.47 per square mile (7.13/km^{2}). The racial makeup of the township was 94.58% White, 0.33% African American, 0.60% Native American, 0.13% Asian, 0.00% Pacific Islander, 0.20% from other races, and 4.17% from two or more races. Hispanic or Latino of any race were 0.99% of the population.

There were 565 households, out of which 32.90% had children under the age of 18 living with them, 55.58% were married couples living together, 14.87% had a female householder with no spouse present, and 25.84% were non-families. 23.90% of all households were made up of individuals, and 16.10% had someone living alone who was 65 years of age or older. The average household size was 2.76 and the average family size was 3.11.

According to the 2020 American Community Survey, township's age distribution consisted of 27.3% under the age of 18, 3.8% from 18 to 24, 24.2% from 25 to 44, 22.6% from 45 to 64, and 22.1% who were 65 years of age or older. The median age was 40.5 years. For every 100 females, there were 106.8 males. For every 100 females age 18 and over, there were 101.5 males.

The median income for a household in the township was $61,926, and the median income for a family was $66,510. Males had a median income of $44,653 versus $36,696 for females. The per capita income for the township was $27,050. About 5.3% of families and 6.7% of the population were below the poverty line, including 9.9% of those under age 18 and 0.6% of those age 65 or over.

Historical population
Census	Pop.	Note	%±
2000	1,546		—
2010	1,550		0.3%
2020	1,512		−2.5%
U.S. Decennial Census

== Adjacent townships ==
- Gillespie Township (north)
- Cahokia Township (northeast)
- Mount Olive Township (east)
- Staunton Township (east)
- Olive Township, Madison County (southeast)
- Omphghent Township, Madison County (south)
- Bunker Hill Township (west)
- Hillyard Township (northwest)
