= Farina, Illinois =

- Village
- Location in Marion County, Illinois
- Coordinates: 38°49′49″N 88°46′47″W
- Country: United States
- State: Illinois
- Counties: Fayette, Marion
- Townships: La Clede, Meacham

Area
  - Total: 1.46 sq mi (3.79 km^{2})
  - Land: 1.46 sq mi (3.77 km^{2})
  - Water: 0.0077 sq mi (0.02 km^{2})
- Elevation: 574 ft (175 m)

Population (2020)
  - Total: 540
  - Density: 370.6/sq mi (143.09/km^{2})
- Time zone: UTC-6 (CST)
  - Summer (DST): UTC-5 (CDT)
- ZIP code: 62838
- Area code: 618
- FIPS code: 17-25375
- GNIS feature ID: 2398860

Farina is a village in Fayette and Marion counties, Illinois, United States. The population was 540 at the 2020 census. It is the only community with the name "Farina" in the United States.

== History ==
Farina was founded in 1867. The community was named after farina (food), from its location in the wheat-growing district. By 1914, Farina became a major shipping hub of farm products and fruit, especially strawberries.

== Geography ==
Farina's limits extend southwest along Illinois Route 37 into Marion County. Interstate 57 passes through the northwest corner of the village at Exit 135, leading northeast 26 miles (42 km) to Effingham and southwest 21 miles (34 km) to Salem. Illinois Route 37 passes through the enter of Farina and runs parallel to I-57. Illinois Route 185 leads northwest 24 miles (39 km) to Vandalia, the Fayette County seat.

According to the 2021 census gazetteer files, Farina has a total area of 1.46 square miles (3.78 km^{2}), of which 1.46 square miles (3.78 km^{2}) (or 99.52%) is land and 0.01 square miles (0.03 km^{2}) (or 0.48%) is water. The village is located at the headwaters of the East Fork of the Kaskaskia River, which drains the village to the southwest.

== Demographics ==
Historical population
Census	Pop.	Note	%±
1870	232		—
1880	318		37.1%
1890	618		94.3%
1900	693		12.1%
1910	774		11.7%
1920	701		−9.4%
1930	694		−1.0%
1940	804		15.9%
1950	787		−2.1%
1960	692		−12.1%
1970	634		−8.4%
1980	594		−6.3%
1990	575		−3.2%
2000	558		−3.0%
2010	518		−7.2%
2020	540		4.2%
U.S. Decennial Census

As of the 2020 census there were 540 people, 255 households, and 176 families residing in the village. The population density was 368.85 inhabitants per square mile (142.41/km^{2}). There were 236 housing units at an average density of 161.20 per square mile (62.24/km^{2}). The racial makeup of the village was 95.74% White, 0.00% African American, 0.37% Native American, 0.93% Asian, 0.00% Pacific Islander, 0.19% from other races, and 2.78% from two or more races. Hispanic or Latino of any race were 1.11% of the population.

There were 255 households, out of which 40.8% had children under the age of 18 living with them, 49.80% were married couples living together, 16.08% had a female householder with no husband present, and 30.98% were non-families. 30.98% of all households were made up of individuals, and 15.29% had someone living alone who was 65 years of age or older. The average household size was 3.49 and the average family size was 2.94.

The village's age distribution consisted of 24.6% under the age of 18, 13.6% from 18 to 24, 19.8% from 25 to 44, 18.2% from 45 to 64, and 23.8% who were 65 years of age or older. The median age was 38.2 years. For every 100 females, there were 98.1 males. For every 100 females age 18 and over, there were 101.1 males.

The median income for a household in the village was $35,313, and the median income for a family was $54,464. Males had a median income of $27,381 versus $19,375 for females. The per capita income for the village was $23,298. About 26.7% of families and 20.9% of the population were below the poverty line, including 28.7% of those under age 18 and 17.4% of those age 65 or over.
