= Nokomis Township, Montgomery County, Illinois =

Nokomis Township
- Township
- Location of Illinois in the United States
- Coordinates: 39°18′N 89°18′W
- Country: United States
- State: Illinois
- County: Montgomery
- Settled: November 5, 1872

Area
  - Total: 36.41 sq mi (94.3 km^{2})
  - Land: 36.4 sq mi (94 km^{2})
  - Water: 0.01 sq mi (0.026 km^{2})
- Elevation: 659 ft (201 m)

Population (2010)
  - Estimate (2016): 2,812
  - Density: 80.7/sq mi (31.2/km^{2})
- Time zone: UTC-6 (CST)
  - Summer (DST): UTC-5 (CDT)
- FIPS code: 17-135-53182

Nokomis Township (T10N R2W) is located in Montgomery County, Illinois, United States. As of the 2010 census, its population was 2,939 and it contained 1,386 housing units.

== Geography ==
According to the 2010 census, the township has a total area of 36.41 square miles (94.3 km^{2}), of which 36.4 square miles (94 km^{2}) (or 99.97%) is land and 0.01 square miles (0.026 km^{2}) (or 0.03%) is water.

== Demographics ==
Historical population
Census	Pop.	Note	%±
2016 (est.)	2,812
U.S. Decennial Census

== Adjacent townships ==
- Greenwood Township, Christian County (north)
- Rosamond Township, Christian County (northeast)
- Audubon Township (east & southeast)
- Witt Township (south)
- Irving Township (southwest)
- Rountree Township (west)
- Ricks Township, Christian County (northwest)
