= Mount Olive Township, Macoupin County, Illinois =

Mt. Olive Township
- Township

- Location of Illinois in the United States
- Coordinates: 39°4′N 89°45′W
- Country: United States
- State: Illinois
- County: Macoupin
- Settled: Unknown

Area
  - Total: 18.27 sq mi (47.3 km^{2})
  - Land: 18.02 sq mi (46.7 km^{2})
  - Water: 0.26 sq mi (0.67 km^{2}) 1.40%
- Elevation: 643 ft (196 m)

Population (2020)
  - Total: 3,091
  - Density: 171.5/sq mi (66.23/km^{2})
- Time zone: UTC-6 (CST)
  - Summer (DST): UTC-5 (CDT)
- FIPS code: 17-117-51037

Mt. Olive Township (N½ T7N R6W) is located in Macoupin County, Illinois, United States. As of the 2020 census, its population was 3,091 and it contained 1,508 housing units.

== Geography ==
According to the 2021 census gazetteer files, Mount Olive Township has a total area of 18.27 square miles (47.32 km^{2}), of which 18.02 square miles (46.67 km^{2}) (or 98.60%) is land and 0.26 square miles (0.67 km^{2}) (or 1.40%) is water.

== Demographics ==
As of the 2020 census there were 3,091 people, 1,382 households, and 868 families residing in the township. The population density was 169.15 inhabitants per square mile (65.31/km^{2}). There were 1,508 housing units at an average density of 82.52 per square mile (31.86/km^{2}). The racial makeup of the township was 95.28% White, 0.16% African American, 0.13% Native American, 0.26% Asian, 0.00% Pacific Islander, 0.36% from other races, and 3.82% from two or more races. Hispanic or Latino of any race were 1.20% of the population.

There were 1,382 households, out of which 24.50% had children under the age of 18 living with them, 47.54% were married couples living together, 11.00% had a female householder with no spouse present, and 37.19% were non-families. 30.00% of all households were made up of individuals, and 14.30% had someone living alone who was 65 years of age or older. The average household size was 2.23 and the average family size was 2.71.

According to the 2020 American Community Survey, township's age distribution consisted of 18.2% under the age of 18, 7.2% from 18 to 24, 23.4% from 25 to 44, 28.1% from 45 to 64, and 23.0% who were 65 years of age or older. The median age was 46.9 years. For every 100 females, there were 98.8 males. For every 100 females age 18 and over, there were 95.7 males.

The median income for a household in the township was $44,531, and the median income for a family was $58,790. Males had a median income of $39,063 versus $23,182 for females. The per capita income for the township was $28,508. About 7.3% of families and 12.7% of the population were below the poverty line, including 21.4% of those under age 18 and 4.1% of those age 65 or over.

Historical population
Census	Pop.	Note	%±
2000	3,379		—
2010	3,274		−3.1%
2020	3,091		−5.6%
U.S. Decennial Census

== Adjacent townships ==
- Cahokia Township (north)
- South Litchfield Township, Montgomery County (northeast)
- Walshville Township, Montgomery County (east)
- Staunton Township (south)
- Dorchester Township (west)
- Gillespie Township (northwest)
