= Witt Township, Montgomery County, Illinois =

Witt Township
- Township

- Location of Illinois in the United States
- Coordinates: 39°13′N 89°18′W
- Country: United States
- State: Illinois
- County: Montgomery
- Settled: November 5, 1872

Area
  - Total: 36.77 sq mi (95.2 km^{2})
  - Land: 36.77 sq mi (95.2 km^{2})
  - Water: 0 sq mi (0 km^{2})
- Elevation: 669 ft (204 m)

Population (2010)
  - Estimate (2016): 1,110
  - Density: 31.6/sq mi (12.2/km^{2})
- Time zone: UTC-6 (CST)
  - Summer (DST): UTC-5 (CDT)
- FIPS code: 17-135-82738

Witt Township (T9N R2W) is located in Montgomery County, Illinois, United States. As of the 2010 census, its population was 1,163 and it contained 585 housing units.

== Geography ==
According to the 2010 census, the township has a total area of 36.77 square miles (95.2 km^{2}), all land.

== Demographics ==
Historical population
Census	Pop.	Note	%±
2016 (est.)	1,110
U.S. Decennial Census

== Adjacent townships ==
- Nokomis Township (north)
- Audubon Township (northeast)
- Hurricane Township, Fayette County (southeast)
- Fillmore Township (south)
- East Fork Township (southwest)
- Irving Township (west)
- Rountree Township (northwest)
