= Glen Hobbie =

American baseball player (1936–2013)

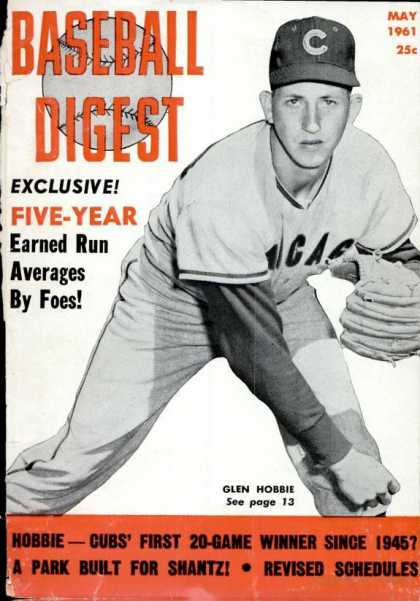
- Hobbie on the cover of Baseball Digest in 1961
- Pitcher
- Born: April 24, 1936; Witt, Illinois, U.S.
- Died: August 9, 2013 (aged 77); Springfield, Illinois, U.S.
- Batted: Right Threw: Right

MLB debut
- September 20, 1957, for the Chicago Cubs

Last MLB appearance
- July 25, 1964, for the St. Louis Cardinals

MLB statistics
- Win–loss record: 62–81
- Earned run average: 4.20
- Strikeouts: 682
- Stats at Baseball Reference

Teams
- Chicago Cubs (1957–1964); St. Louis Cardinals (1964)

Glen Frederick Hobbie (April 24, 1936 – August 9, 2013) was an American professional baseball player who pitched in the Major Leagues from 1957 to 1964. A right-hander, he stood 6 feet 2 inches (1.88 m) tall and weighed 195 pounds (88 kg). Born in Witt, Illinois, Hobbie attended and graduated from Witt High School.

All but 13 of Hobbie's 284 games played were spent in the uniform of the Chicago Cubs, for whom he won 16 games in back-to-back seasons (1959–1960). He also lost 20 games in 1960, tying for the National League lead in that category. He was traded to the St. Louis Cardinals for veteran pitcher Lew Burdette on June 2, 1964, but his last MLB appearance came only seven weeks later and Hobbie finished that campaign in minor league baseball. Overall, he posted a 62–81 won–lost record, 682 strikeouts and a 4.20 earned run average in 284 games pitched (170 as a starter) during his Major League career, with 45 Complete games and 11 shutouts; he also earned six saves in relief. He surrendered 1,283 hits and 495 bases on balls.

After retiring from baseball, Hobbie worked as a supervisor for the Roller Derby Association in Litchfield. He died at the age of 77 on August 9, 2013, at a hospital in Springfield, Illinois.
