= Irving Township, Montgomery County, Illinois =

Irving Township
- Township

- Location of Illinois in the United States
- Coordinates: 39°13′N 89°25′W
- Country: United States
- State: Illinois
- County: Montgomery
- Settled: November 5, 1872

Area
  - Total: 35.71 sq mi (92.5 km^{2})
  - Land: 34.28 sq mi (88.8 km^{2})
  - Water: 1.43 sq mi (3.7 km^{2})
- Elevation: 650 ft (200 m)

Population (2010)
  - Estimate (2016): 962
  - Density: 29.3/sq mi (11.3/km^{2})
- Time zone: UTC-6 (CST)
  - Summer (DST): UTC-5 (CDT)
- FIPS code: 17-135-37751

Irving Township (T9N R3W) is located in Montgomery County, Illinois, United States. As of the 2010 census, its population was 1,006 and it contained 454 housing units.

== Geography ==
According to the 2010 census, the township has a total area of 35.71 square miles (92.5 km^{2}), of which 34.28 square miles (88.8 km^{2}) (or 96.00%) is land and 1.43 square miles (3.7 km^{2}) (or 4.00%) is water.

== Demographics ==
Historical population
Census	Pop.	Note	%±
2016 (est.)	962
U.S. Decennial Census

== Adjacent townships ==
- Rountree Township (north)
- Nokomis Township (northeast)
- Witt Township (east)
- Fillmore Township (southeast)
- East Fork Township (south)
- Hillsboro Township (southwest)
- Butler Grove Township (west)
- Raymond Township (northwest)
