= Illinois Route 185 =

State highway in south-central Illinois, US

Illinois Route 185
- IL 185 highlighted in red

Route information
- Maintained by IDOT
- Length: 49.88 mi (80.27 km)
- Existed: 1924–present

Major junctions
- West end: IL 127 in Taylor Springs
- US 40 in Vandalia; US 51 in Vandalia; US 40 in Bluff City; I-57 in Farina
- East end: IL 37 in Farina

Location
- Country: United States
- State: Illinois
- Counties: Montgomery, Fayette

Highway system
- Illinois State Highway System; Interstate; US; State; Tollways; Scenic
← IL 184	→ I-190

Illinois Route 185 is an east–west state road in the south-central portion of the U.S. state of Illinois. Its western terminus is in Taylor Springs at Illinois Route 127, and the eastern terminus is at Farina at Illinois Route 37. This is a distance of 49.88 miles (80.27 km).

== Route description ==
Illinois 185 runs geographically northwest–southeast through south-central Illinois. It overlaps both U.S. Route 40 and U.S. Route 51 through the city of Vandalia.

== History ==
SBI Route 185 originally ran from Bluff City to Farina. In 1949, it was extended northwest to Taylor Springs.

== Major Intersections ==
County	Location	mi	km	Destinations	Notes
Montgomery	Taylor Springs	0.0	0.0	IL 127	Western terminus of IL 185
Fayette	Vandalia	23.7	38.1	US 40 west	West end of US 40 concurrency
Fayette	Vandalia	24.8	39.9	US 51 north (Kennedy Blvd) – Pana	West end of US 51 concurrency
Fayette		26.4	42.5	US 51 south – Sandoval	East end of US 51 concurrency
Fayette		30.5	49.1	US 40 east to I-70 – Brownstown	East end of US 40 concurrency
Fayette	Farina	48.9	78.7	I-57 – Effingham, Mt. Vernon	I-57 exit 135
Fayette	Farina	49.88	80.27	IL 37 – Effingham, Salem	Eastern terminus of IL 185
1.000 mi = 1.609 km; 1.000 km = 0.621 mi: Concurrency terminus
