= Theodore Oesten =

German composer, musician, and music teacher

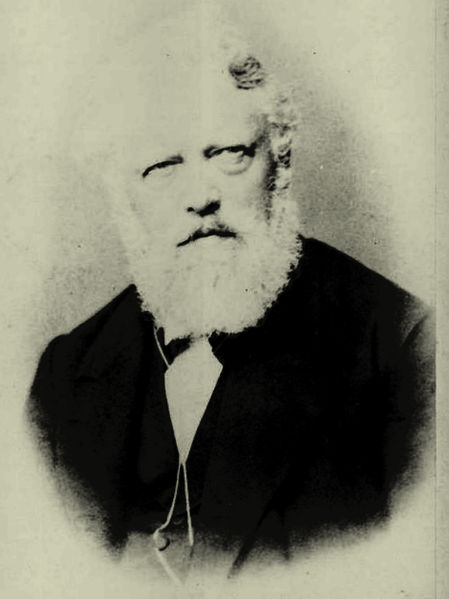
Theodor Oesten

Theodore Oesten (also Theodor in German) (December 31, 1813 – March 16, 1870) was a German composer, musician, and music teacher.

Oesten was born in Berlin. He learned to play wind and string instruments from the Stadtmusikus in Fürstenwalde (a small town outside Berlin). At the age of nineteen he studied composition with Böhmer, Carl Friedrich Rungenhagen, G. A. Schneider and August Wilhelm Bach in Berlin. Oesten is perhaps best known for his easy to play piano compositions, including transcriptions of operatic works, written in the sentimental style of his day. He died in his native city of Berlin. His son Max Oesten also became a composer.

== Partial list of piano compositions ==
(Note: Items without reference numbers are from a list at Piano Master*Works.

- A Little Story
- 12 Standard Pieces For Piano: Alpine Bells (Alpenglockchen)
- Alpine Glow (Alpengluhen Idylle), Op. 193
- Carnival Of Venice (Capricietto Brillant)
- Cradle Song (Schlummerlied), Opus 91
- De Boself
- Der kuss, Opus 205
- Dolly's Dreaming and Awakening (Puppchens Traumen Und Erwachen!); Cradle Song (Wiegenlied), Opus 202, No. 4
- Echo Idylle, Opus 223
- Farewell
- Forest Roses
- Gondellied, Op. 56
- Heavenly Bliss (Seliges Gluck), Opus 50, No. 4
- Illustrations: Six Elegant Fantasias n Favorite Themes, Op. 99
- La fille du régiment, Opus 57, No. 10, Perles de L'Opera, 12 Morceaux Elegantes
- Long Long Weary Day, Op. 49
- Love In May (Maienliebe), Op. 50, No. 1
- Lucia Di Lammermoor, Six Fantaisies Brilliantes Sur Des Motifs Favoris De L'Opera, Op. 67
- Morning Song
- On The Rialto (Auf Den Lugunen), Barcarolle For Piano, Op. 222
- Sleep Well, Thou Sweet Angel, Opus 277 No. 2
- Snowbells' Spring Carol (Idylle), Op. 227
- Souvenir de Martha, Fantaisie Brillante On Flotow's Opera
- Spanish Dance Op.61, No.10
- The Little Tyrolean Maid
- When The Swallows Homeward Fly: Agathe
- With Bow And Arrow
