= Hillsboro, Illinois =

- City
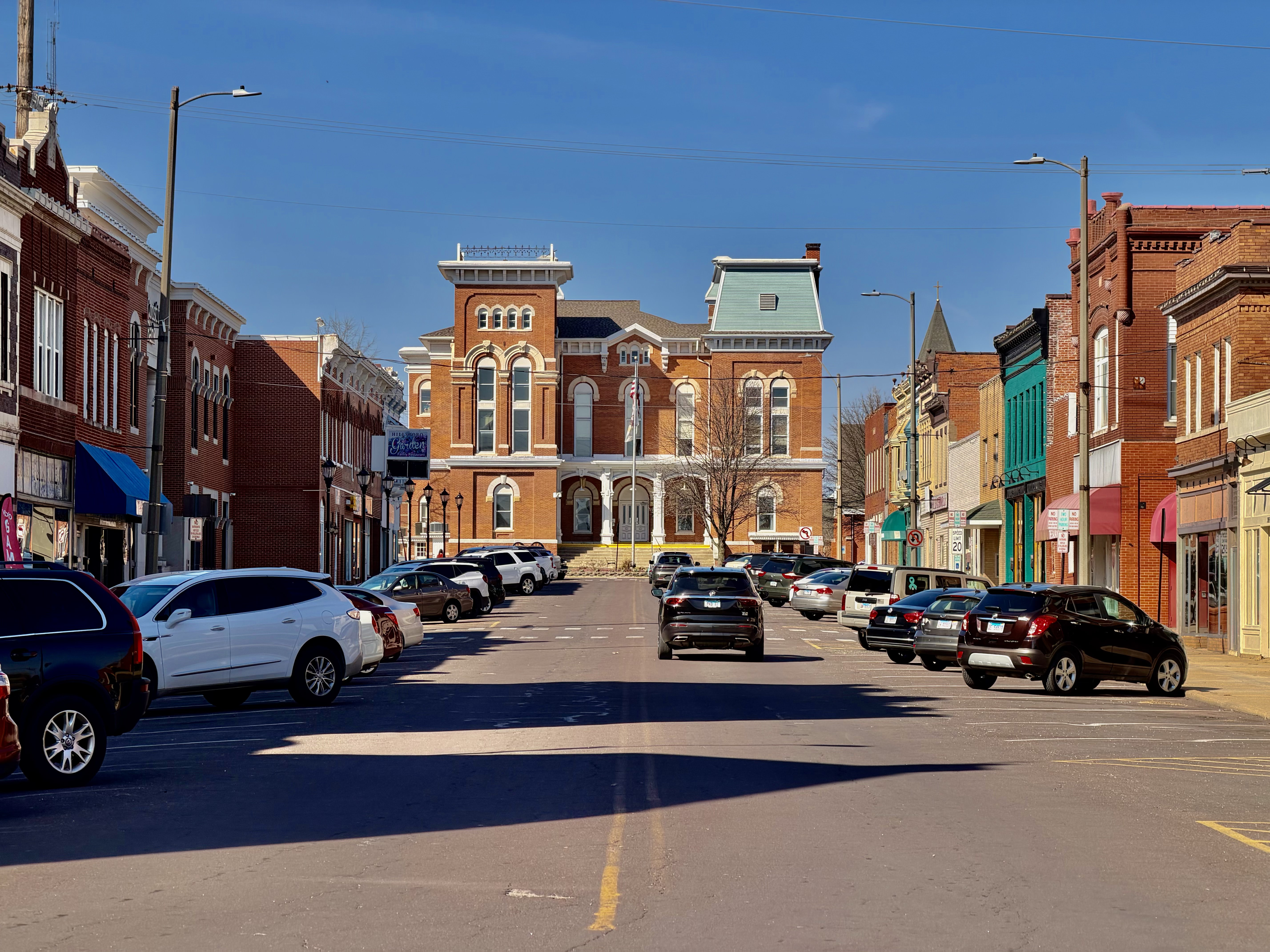
- Historic Courthouse from Main Street
- Motto(s): "Pride, Progress, Prosperity"
- Interactive map of Hillsboro, Illinois
- Location within Illinois Location within the United States
- Coordinates: 39°10′31″N 89°28′20″W
- Country: United States
- State: Illinois
- County: Montgomery
- Townships: Hillsboro, East Fork, Butler Grove, Irving

Government
  - Mayor: Don Downs

Area
  - Total: 10.17 sq mi (26.35 km^{2})
  - Land: 8.42 sq mi (21.82 km^{2})
  - Water: 1.75 sq mi (4.53 km^{2})
- Elevation: 587 ft (179 m)

Population (2020)
  - Total: 5,902
  - Density: 701/sq mi (270.5/km^{2})
- Time zone: UTC-6 (CST)
  - Summer (DST): UTC-5 (CDT)
- ZIP code: 62049
- Area code: 217
- FIPS code: 17-35047
- GNIS feature ID: 2394386
- Website: www.hillsboroillinois.net

Hillsboro is a city in and the county seat of Montgomery County, Illinois, United States. The population was 5,902 at the 2020 census.

== History ==
The community was founded in 1823 and incorporated on March 26, 1913.

There is some doubt about the origin of the city's name. The local terrain is quite hilly, as a result of the drainage of the Shoal Creek watershed, causing widespread belief that this is the name's source. Alternatively, there is the belief that it was named for Hillsborough, North Carolina, the home of some of the early settlers, including Hiram Rountree and John Nussman.

== Geography ==
Hillsboro is located south of the center of Montgomery County and is bordered to the east by Schram City and to the south by Taylor Springs.

Illinois Route 16 passes through the city center, leading west 9 miles (14 km) to Litchfield and northeast 28 miles (45 km) to Pana. Illinois Route 127 enters Hillsboro from the northwest with IL 16 but continues south as Vandalia Road; IL 127 leads north-northwest 12 miles (19 km) to Raymond and south 20 miles (32 km) to Greenville. Vandalia is 27 miles (43 km) to the southeast via Illinois Route 185.

According to the U.S. Census Bureau, Hillsboro has a total area of 10.4 square miles (27 km^{2}), of which 8.7 square miles (23 km^{2}) are land and 1.8 square miles (4.7 km^{2}), or 16.84%, are water. The Middle Fork of Shoal Creek passes just west of the city limits, flowing south toward the Kaskaskia River. Lake Glenn Shoals, north of the city, is a reservoir on the Middle Fork, and the Hillsboro city limits extend north more than 6 miles (10 km) to encompass the lake. Lake Hillsboro is a smaller reservoir on a tributary of the Middle Fork, northeast of the city center.

=== Climate ===
Climate data for Hillsboro, Illinois (1991–2020 normals, extremes 1895–present)
Month	Jan	Feb	Mar	Apr	May	Jun	Jul	Aug	Sep	Oct	Nov	Dec	Year
Record high °F (°C)	75 (24)	79 (26)	90 (32)	92 (33)	99 (37)	106 (41)	114 (46)	112 (44)	105 (41)	95 (35)	83 (28)	74 (23)	114 (46)
Mean daily maximum °F (°C)	38.4 (3.6)	44.5 (6.9)	55.4 (13.0)	68.3 (20.2)	77.7 (25.4)	86.0 (30.0)	88.7 (31.5)	87.3 (30.7)	81.7 (27.6)	69.7 (20.9)	54.6 (12.6)	42.8 (6.0)	66.3 (19.1)
Daily mean °F (°C)	29.9 (−1.2)	34.9 (1.6)	44.8 (7.1)	56.2 (13.4)	66.0 (18.9)	74.6 (23.7)	77.6 (25.3)	76.0 (24.4)	69.2 (20.7)	57.8 (14.3)	44.9 (7.2)	34.6 (1.4)	55.5 (13.1)
Mean daily minimum °F (°C)	21.4 (−5.9)	25.4 (−3.7)	34.2 (1.2)	44.1 (6.7)	54.3 (12.4)	63.3 (17.4)	66.6 (19.2)	64.7 (18.2)	56.7 (13.7)	45.8 (7.7)	35.2 (1.8)	26.4 (−3.1)	44.8 (7.1)
Record low °F (°C)	−21 (−29)	−22 (−30)	−10 (−23)	18 (−8)	28 (−2)	37 (3)	45 (7)	39 (4)	26 (−3)	17 (−8)	−5 (−21)	−20 (−29)	−22 (−30)
Average precipitation inches (mm)	2.52 (64)	2.61 (66)	3.05 (77)	5.03 (128)	5.06 (129)	3.83 (97)	3.74 (95)	3.14 (80)	3.30 (84)	3.41 (87)	3.76 (96)	2.62 (67)	42.07 (1,069)
Average precipitation days (≥ 0.01 in)	6.3	6.3	8.4	9.6	11.2	8.6	7.3	6.6	5.9	7.3	6.6	6.8	90.9
Source: NOAA

== Demographics ==
Historical population
Census	Pop.	Note	%±
1860	853		—
1880	1,803		—
1900	1,937		—
1910	3,424		76.8%
1920	5,074		48.2%
1930	4,435		−12.6%
1940	4,514		1.8%
1950	4,141		−8.3%
1960	4,232		2.2%
1970	4,267		0.8%
1980	4,408		3.3%
1990	4,400		−0.2%
2000	4,359		−0.9%
2010	6,207		42.4%
2020	5,902		−4.9%
U.S. Decennial Census

=== 2020 census ===
As of the 2020 census, Hillsboro had a population of 5,902. The median age was 39.9 years. 15.2% of residents were under the age of 18 and 16.1% of residents were 65 years of age or older. For every 100 females there were 177.9 males, and for every 100 females age 18 and over there were 198.6 males age 18 and over.

95.2% of residents lived in urban areas, while 4.8% lived in rural areas.

There were 1,746 households in Hillsboro, of which 27.7% had children under the age of 18 living in them. Of all households, 44.6% were married-couple households, 18.4% were households with a male householder and no spouse or partner present, and 31.1% were households with a female householder and no spouse or partner present. About 33.4% of all households were made up of individuals and 17.2% had someone living alone who was 65 years of age or older.

There were 1,973 housing units, of which 11.5% were vacant. The homeowner vacancy rate was 2.8% and the rental vacancy rate was 11.3%.

Racial composition as of the 2020 census
Race	Number	Percent
White	4,690	79.5%
Black or African American	832	14.1%
American Indian and Alaska Native	16	0.3%
Asian	27	0.5%
Native Hawaiian and Other Pacific Islander	2	0.0%
Some other race	152	2.6%
Two or more races	183	3.1%
Hispanic or Latino (of any race)	220	3.7%

=== 2000 census ===
As of the census of 2000, there were 4,359 people, 1,800 households, and 1,189 families residing in the city. The population density was 1,214.9 inhabitants per square mile (469.1/km^{2}). There were 1,944 housing units at an average density of 541.8 per square mile (209.2/km^{2}). The racial makeup of the city was 97.22% White, 1.10% African American, 0.32% Native American, 0.37% Asian, 0.07% Pacific Islander, 0.39% from other races, and 0.53% from two or more races. Hispanic or Latino of any race were 1.19% of the population.

There were 1,800 households, out of which 33.1% had children under the age of 18 living with them, 50.2% were married couples living together, 11.9% had a female householder with no husband present, and 33.9% were non-families. 30.0% of all households were made up of individuals, and 14.8% had someone living alone who was 65 years of age or older. The average household size was 2.36 and the average family size was 2.91.

In the city, the population was spread out, with 25.8% under the age of 18, 8.4% from 18 to 24, 27.2% from 25 to 44, 21.0% from 45 to 64, and 17.6% who were 65 years of age or older. The median age was 38 years. For every 100 females, there were 85.7 males. For every 100 females age 18 and over, there were 80.3 males.

The median income for a household in the city was $33,075, and the median income for a family was $40,135. Males had a median income of $31,821 versus $18,668 for females. The per capita income for the city was $17,458. About 14.3% of families and 17.2% of the population were below the poverty line, including 24.9% of those under age 18 and 11.9% of those age 65 or over.

== Protected areas ==
The Bremer Wildlife Sanctuary, north of Hillsboro, is the southeastern terminus of the Arches Rail Trail. The 3-mile-long (5 km) rail trail connects the Hillsboro area with nearby Butler.

== Notable people ==
- Harry Bellaver (1905–1993), stage, film, and television actor
- Stephen D. Canady (1865–1923), Illinois state legislator and businessman
- John R. Challacombe (1845–1935), Illinois state legislator and businessman
- Otto Funk (1868–1934), violinist
- Brian Graden (born 1963), President of Entertainment, MTV Networks
- Mary Hartline (1926–2020), early television star
- Matt Hughes (born 1973), 2x UFC Welterweight Champion
- Mark Hughes (born 1973), mixed martial artist
- Ralph Isselhardt (1910–1972), football player
- Wickliffe Kitchell (1789–1869), Illinois lawyer and politician
- Jesse J. Phillips (1837–1901), Chief Justice of the Illinois Supreme Court
- Norman W. Ray (born 1942), United States admiral
- John H. Rountree (1805–1890), Wisconsin legislator
- John Tillson (1825–1892), Illinois legislator and lawyer
- Stan Wallace (1931–1999), defensive back for Chicago Bears in 1950s
- John Meek Whitehead (1852–1924), Wisconsin state senator
