= Hillsboro Township, Montgomery County, Illinois =

Hillsboro Township
- Township
- Location in Montgomery County
- Coordinates: 39°8′N 89°31′W
- Country: United States
- State: Illinois
- County: Montgomery
- Settled: November 5, 1872

Area
  - Total: 33.3 sq mi (86 km^{2})
  - Land: 33.2 sq mi (86 km^{2})
  - Water: 0.1 sq mi (0.26 km^{2})
- Elevation: 636 ft (194 m)

Population (2000)
  - Total: 5,515
  - Density: 166/sq mi (64.1/km^{2})
- Time zone: UTC-6 (CST)
  - Summer (DST): UTC-5 (CDT)

Hillsboro Township (T8N R4W) is located in Montgomery County, Illinois, United States. The population was 5,515 at the 2000 census.

== Adjacent townships ==
- Butler Grove Township (north)
- Irving Township (northeast)
- East Fork Township (east & southeast)
- Grisham Township (south)
- Walshville Township (southwest)
- South Litchfield Township (west)
- North Litchfield Township (northwest)
