= Butler Grove Township, Montgomery County, Illinois =

Butler Grove Township
- Township

- Location of Illinois in the United States
- Coordinates: 39°13′N 89°32′W
- Country: United States
- State: Illinois
- County: Montgomery
- Settled: November 5, 1872

Area
  - Total: 36.1 sq mi (93 km^{2})
  - Land: 35.77 sq mi (92.6 km^{2})
  - Water: 0.33 sq mi (0.85 km^{2})
- Elevation: 633 ft (193 m)

Population (2010)
  - Estimate (2016): 747
  - Density: 21.7/sq mi (8.4/km^{2})
- Time zone: UTC-6 (CST)
  - Summer (DST): UTC-5 (CDT)
- FIPS code: 17-135-10175

Butler Grove Township (T9N R4W) is located in Montgomery County, Illinois, United States. As of the 2010 census, its population was 775 and it contained 374 housing units.

== Geography ==
According to the 2010 census, the township has a total area of 36.1 square miles (93 km^{2}), of which 35.77 square miles (92.6 km^{2}) (or 99.09%) is land and 0.33 square miles (0.85 km^{2}) (or 0.91%) is water.

== Demographics ==
Historical population
Census	Pop.	Note	%±
2016 (est.)	747
U.S. Decennial Census

== Protected areas ==
- Arches Rail Trail

== Adjacent townships ==
- Raymond Township (north)
- Rountree Township (northeast)
- Irving Township (east)
- East Fork Township (southeast)
- Hillsboro Township (south)
- South Litchfield Township (southwest)
- North Litchfield Township (west)
- Zanesville Township (northwest)
