= New Douglas Township, Madison County, Illinois =

New Douglas Township
- Township

- Location of Illinois in the United States
- Coordinates: 38°57′27″N 89°40′34″W
- Country: United States
- State: Illinois
- County: Madison
- Settled: November 2, 1875

Area
  - Total: 20.96 sq mi (54.3 km^{2})
  - Land: 20.9 sq mi (54 km^{2})
  - Water: 0.06 sq mi (0.16 km^{2})
- Elevation: 610 ft (190 m)

Population (2010)
  - Estimate (2016): 501
  - Density: 24.4/sq mi (9.4/km^{2})
- Time zone: UTC-6 (CST)
  - Summer (DST): UTC-5 (CDT)
- FIPS code: 17-119-52428

New Douglas Township is located in Madison County, Illinois, in the United States. As of the 2010 census, its population was 509 and it contained 238 housing units.

== Geography ==
According to the 2010 census, the township has a total area of 20.96 square miles (54.3 km^{2}), of which 20.9 square miles (54 km^{2}) (or 99.71%) is land and 0.06 square miles (0.16 km^{2}) (or 0.29%) is water.

== Demographics ==
Historical population
Census	Pop.	Note	%±
2016 (est.)	501
U.S. Decennial Census
