= East Fork Township, Benson County, North Dakota =

Civil township in North Dakota, U.S.

Coordinates: 47°52′00″N 99°43′01″W

East Fork Township is a civil township in Benson County, North Dakota, United States. As of the 2000 census, its population was 36.
