= Ricks Township, Christian County, Illinois =

Ricks Township
- Township
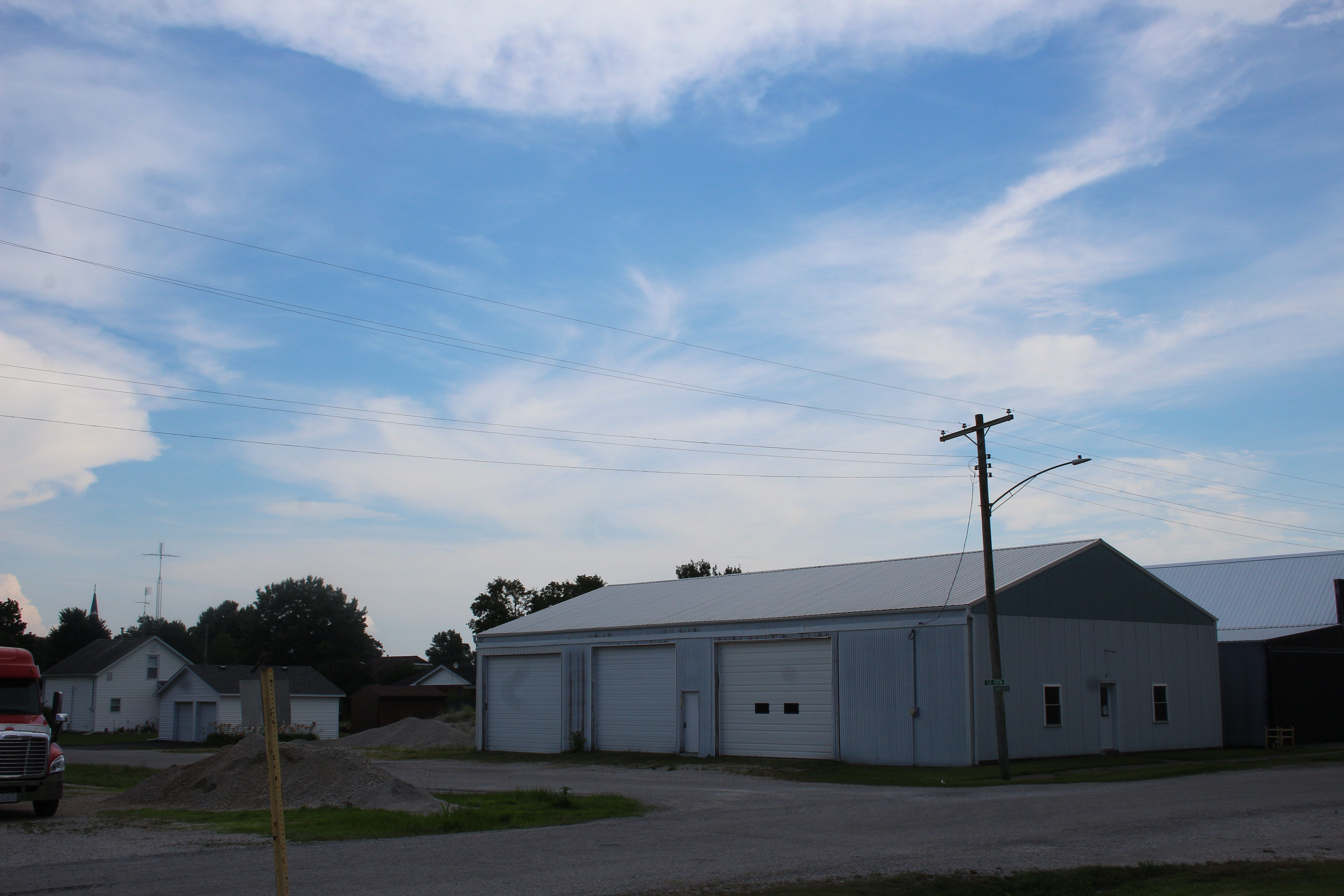
- Township building in Morrisonville

- Location in Christian County

- Christian County's location in Illinois
- Coordinates: 39°23′19″N 89°25′31″W
- Country: United States
- State: Illinois
- County: Christian
- Established: November 7, 1865

Area
  - Total: 35.99 sq mi (93.2 km^{2})
  - Land: 35.97 sq mi (93.2 km^{2})
  - Water: 0.02 sq mi (0.052 km^{2}) 0.06%
- Elevation: 620 ft (190 m)

Population (2020)
  - Total: 1,173
  - Density: 32.61/sq mi (12.59/km^{2})
- Time zone: UTC-6 (CST)
  - Summer (DST): UTC-5 (CDT)
- ZIP codes: 62075, 62546
- FIPS code: 17-021-63797

Ricks Township is one of seventeen townships in Christian County, Illinois, USA. As of the 2020 census, its population was 1,173 and it contained 524 housing units.

== Geography ==
According to the 2010 census, the township has a total area of 35.99 square miles (93.2 km^{2}), of which 35.97 square miles (93.2 km^{2}) (or 99.94%) is land and 0.02 square miles (0.052 km^{2}) (or 0.06%) is water.

=== Cities, towns, villages ===
- Morrisonville

=== Cemeteries ===
The township contains Saint Maurice Catholic Cemetery.

=== Major highways ===
- Illinois Route 48

== Demographics ==
Historical population
| Census | Pop. | Note | %± |
|---|---|---|---|
| 1870 | 414 | | — |
| 1880 | 1,606 | | 287.9% |
| 1890 | 1,652 | | 2.9% |
| 1900 | 1,675 | | 1.4% |
| 1910 | 1,789 | | 6.8% |
| 1920 | 1,829 | | 2.2% |
| 1930 | 1,532 | | −16.2% |
| 1940 | 1,723 | | 12.5% |
| 1950 | 1,629 | | −5.5% |
| 1960 | 1,552 | | −4.7% |
| 1970 | 1,528 | | −1.5% |
| 1980 | 1,449 | | −5.2% |
| 1990 | 1,348 | | −7.0% |
| 2000 | 1,272 | | −5.6% |
| 2010 | 1,223 | | −3.9% |
| 2020 | 1,173 | | −4.1% |
U.S. Decennial Census

As of the 2020 census there were 1,173 people, 520 households, and 369 families residing in the township. The population density was 32.59 inhabitants per square mile (12.58/km^{2}). There were 524 housing units at an average density of 14.56 per square mile (5.62/km^{2}). The racial makeup of the township was 94.80% White, 0.17% African American, 0.26% Native American, 0.34% Asian, 0.00% Pacific Islander, 0.17% from other races, and 4.26% from two or more races. Hispanic or Latino of any race were 1.53% of the population.

There were 520 households, out of which 31.00% had children under the age of 18 living with them, 55.58% were married couples living together, 8.65% had a female householder with no spouse present, and 29.04% were non-families. 26.50% of all households were made up of individuals, and 11.20% had someone living alone who was 65 years of age or older. The average household size was 2.53 and the average family size was 2.89.

The township's age distribution consisted of 26.7% under the age of 18, 8.8% from 18 to 24, 23.3% from 25 to 44, 25.4% from 45 to 64, and 15.8% who were 65 years of age or older. The median age was 34.9 years. For every 100 females, there were 98.9 males. For every 100 females age 18 and over, there were 104.7 males.

The median income for a household in the township was $68,421, and the median income for a family was $78,125. Males had a median income of $50,819 versus $29,559 for females. The per capita income for the township was $31,515. About 4.6% of families and 7.7% of the population were below the poverty line, including 19.1% of those under age 18 and 5.8% of those age 65 or over.

== School districts ==
- Morrisonville Community Unit School District 1
- Nokomis Community Unit School District 22

== Political districts ==
- State House District 98
- State Senate District 49
