= Shoal Creek (Illinois) =

Physical characteristics
- Source
  - location: Confluence of the creek's west fork and middle fork southwest of Hillsboro
  - coordinates: 39°05′05″N 89°32′39″W
- Mouth
  - location: Confluence with the Kaskaskia River near Okawille
  - coordinates: 38°29′00″N 89°34′38″W
  - elevation: 400 ft (120 m)
- Discharge
  - location: Breese, Illinois
  - average: 584 cu/ft. per sec.

Basin features
- GNIS ID: 418443

Shoal Creek is a watercourse in the U.S. state of Illinois. It rises near Harvel, Illinois and, flowing southward through Lake Lou Yaeger, discharges into the Kaskaskia River near Okawville. It drains parts of Montgomery County, Bond County, and Clinton County.

Shoal Creek is named for the many shoals and sandbars strewn along its bed. These features prevented the creek from being much used by Native Americans or Euro-American pioneers for travel or commerce. The creek is heavily used in modern times, however, for recreation, flood control, and piped water supply. Until 2019 the creek's water was also used for electrical power generation. Going from north to south, Lake Lou Yaeger and Lake Glenn Shoals, both impoundments of various forks of Shoal Creek, are used by many boaters and fisherfolk; a third Shoal Creek lake, Coffeen Lake, is the site of the Coffeen Power Station, an inactive 900-MW Dynegy electric generating plant; and a fourth lake, Governor Bond Lake, serves the town of Greenville, Illinois.
