= East Fork Township, Montgomery County, Illinois =

East Fork Township
- Township

- Location of Illinois in the United States
- Coordinates: 39°6′N 89°25′W
- Country: United States
- State: Illinois
- County: Montgomery
- Settled: November 5, 1872

Area
  - Total: 59.66 sq mi (154.5 km^{2})
  - Land: 57.96 sq mi (150.1 km^{2})
  - Water: 1.7 sq mi (4.4 km^{2})
- Elevation: 617 ft (188 m)

Population (2010)
  - Estimate (2016): 2,467
- Time zone: UTC-6 (CST)
  - Summer (DST): UTC-5 (CDT)
- FIPS code: 17-135-21761

East Fork Township is located in Montgomery County, Illinois, United States. As of the 2010 census, its population was 2,566 and it contained 1,093 housing units.

== Adjacent townships ==
- Irving Township (north)
- Witt Township (northeast)
- Fillmore Township (east)
- South Fillmore Township (east)
- Mulberry Grove Township, Bond County (southeast)
- La Grange Township, Bond County (south)
- Shoal Creek Township, Bond County (southwest)
- Grisham Township (west)
- Hillsboro Township (west)
- Butler Grove Township (northwest)

== Geography ==
According to the 2010 census, the township has a total area of 59.66 square miles (154.5 km^{2}), of which 57.96 square miles (150.1 km^{2}) (or 97.15%) is land and 1.7 square miles (4.4 km^{2}) (or 2.85%) is water.

== Demographics ==
Historical population
Census	Pop.	Note	%±
2016 (est.)	2,467
U.S. Decennial Census
