= Montgomery County, Illinois =

County in Illinois, United States

- County
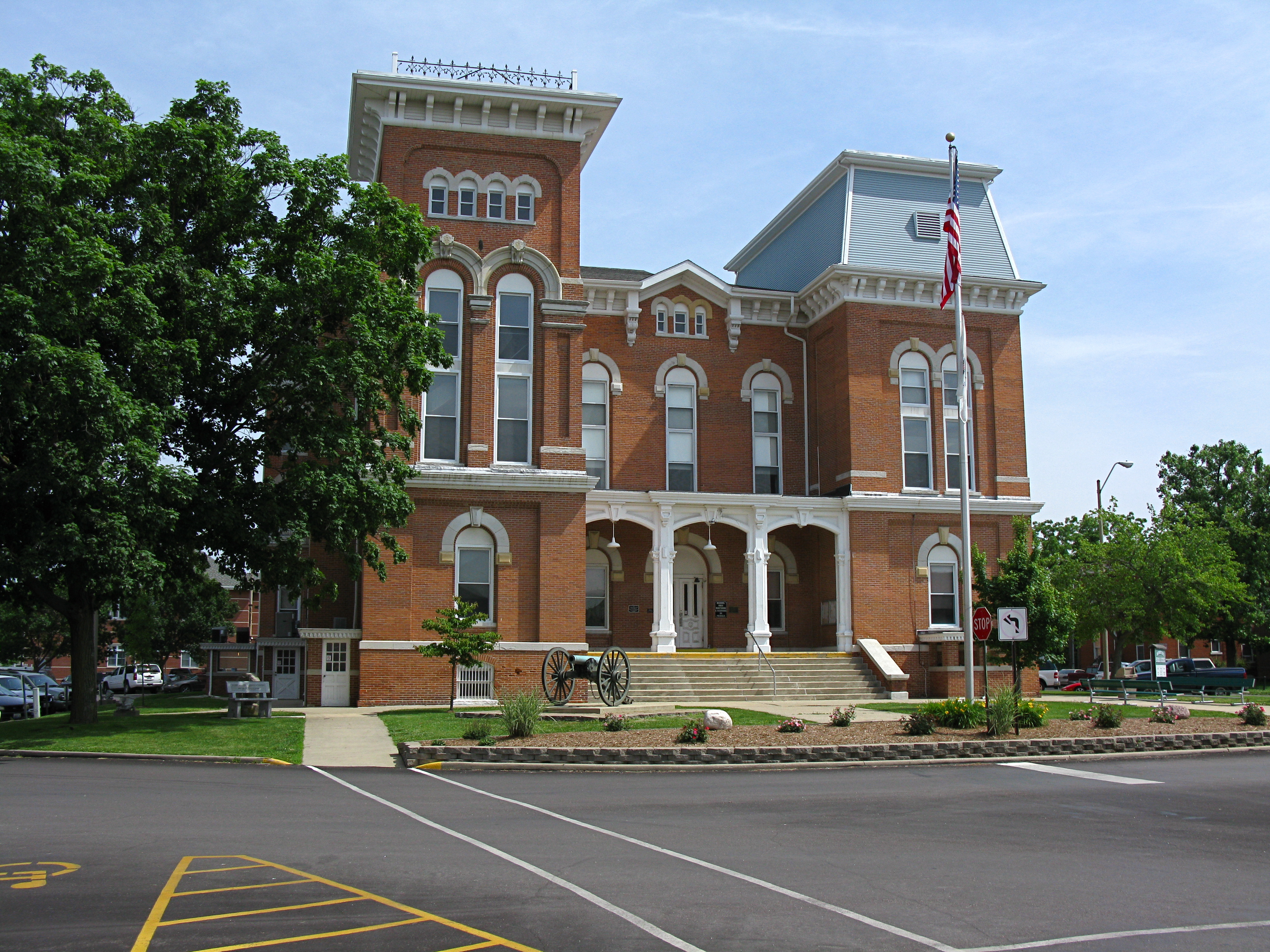
- Montgomery County Courthouse, Hillsboro

- Location within the U.S. state of Illinois
- Coordinates: 39°14′N 89°29′W
- Country: United States
- State: Illinois
- Founded: 1821
- Named for: Richard Montgomery
- Seat: Hillsboro
- Largest city: Litchfield

Area
  - Total: 710 sq mi (1,800 km^{2})
  - Land: 704 sq mi (1,820 km^{2})
  - Water: 6.0 sq mi (16 km^{2}) 0.8%

Population (2020)
  - Total: 28,288
  - Estimate (2025): 28,076 ▼
  - Density: 40.2/sq mi (15.5/km^{2})
- Time zone: UTC−6 (Central)
  - Summer (DST): UTC−5 (CDT)
- Congressional district: 15th
- Website: montgomerycountyil.gov

Montgomery County is a county located in the U.S. state of Illinois. According to the 2020 United States census, it had a population of 28,288. Its county seat is Hillsboro.

== History ==
Montgomery County was formed in 1821 out of Bond and Madison counties. It was named in honor of Richard Montgomery, an American Revolutionary War general killed in 1775 while attempting to capture Quebec City, Canada. Perrin's 1882 History of Montgomery County relates that the county was named in honor of Gen. Montgomery, but goes on to say that "others are dubious as to whence it received its name."

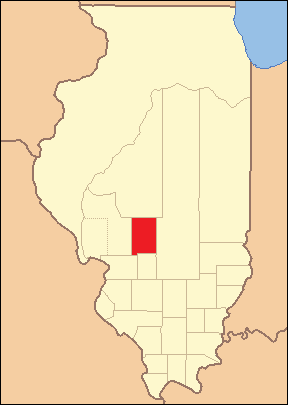
Montgomery County from the time of its creation to 1827

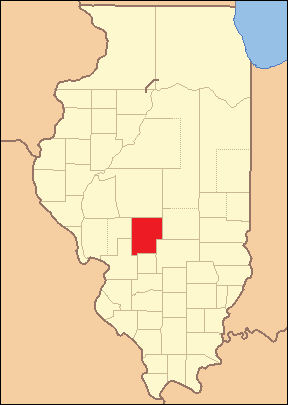
Montgomery County between 1827 and 1839

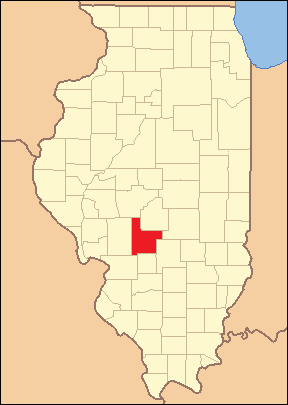
Montgomery in 1839, reduced to its present borders

== Geography ==
According to the U.S. Census Bureau, the county has a total area of 710 square miles (1,800 km^{2}), of which 704 square miles (1,820 km^{2}) is land and 6.0 square miles (16 km^{2}) (0.8%) is water.

=== Climate and weather ===
Hillsboro, Illinois

Climate chart (precipitation, max. and min. temperature)
J	F	M	A	M	J	J	A	S	O	N	D
2.2 37 21	2 44 26	3.6 56 35	4.2 68 45	4.3 78 55	4.1 87 64	3.5 91 68	3.5 89 66	3.2 82 58	2.9 71 47	3.8 55 37	3 42 26
- █ Average max. and min. temperatures in °F
- █ Precipitation totals in inches
- Source: The Weather Channel
Metric conversion
J	F	M	A	M	J	J	A	S	O	N	D
55 3 −6	51 7 −3	90 13 2	106 20 7	109 26 13	103 31 18	88 33 20	90 32 19	80 28 14	74 22 8	97 13 3	76 6 −3
- █ Average max. and min. temperatures in °C
- █ Precipitation totals in mm

In recent years, average temperatures in the county seat of Hillsboro have ranged from a low of 21 °F (−6 °C) in January to a high of 91 °F (33 °C) in July, although a record low of −22 °F (−30 °C) was recorded in February 1905 and a record high of 114 °F (46 °C) was recorded in July 1954. Average monthly precipitation ranged from 2.00 inches (51 mm) in February to 4.31 inches (109 mm) in May.

=== Adjacent counties ===
- Sangamon County - north
- Christian County - northeast
- Shelby County - east
- Fayette County - southeast
- Bond County - south
- Madison County - southwest
- Macoupin County - west

== Transportation ==
=== Major highways ===
- Interstate 55
- Illinois Route 16
- Illinois Route 48
- Illinois Route 108
- Illinois Route 127
- Illinois Route 185

=== Airports ===
Litchfield Municipal Airport is located in Montgomery County, two nautical miles (3.7 km) southwest of the central business district of Litchfield, Illinois.

== Demographics ==
Historical population
Census	Pop.	Note	%±
1830	2,953		—
1840	4,490		52.0%
1850	6,277		39.8%
1860	13,979		122.7%
1870	25,314		81.1%
1880	28,078		10.9%
1890	30,003		6.9%
1900	30,836		2.8%
1910	35,311		14.5%
1920	41,403		17.3%
1930	35,278		−14.8%
1940	34,499		−2.2%
1950	32,460		−5.9%
1960	31,244		−3.7%
1970	30,260		−3.1%
1980	31,686		4.7%
1990	30,728		−3.0%
2000	30,652		−0.2%
2010	30,104		−1.8%
2020	28,288		−6.0%
2025 (est.)	28,076	▼	−0.7%
U.S. Decennial Census; 1790-1960 1900-1990; 1990-2000 2010

=== 2020 census ===
As of the 2020 census, the county had a population of 28,288. The median age was 43.7 years. 20.4% of residents were under the age of 18 and 21.2% of residents were 65 years of age or older. For every 100 females there were 108.3 males, and for every 100 females age 18 and over there were 110.2 males age 18 and over.

The racial makeup of the county was 91.5% White, 3.3% Black or African American, 0.2% American Indian and Alaska Native, 0.5% Asian, <0.1% Native Hawaiian and Pacific Islander, 0.9% from some other race, and 3.7% from two or more races. Hispanic or Latino residents of any race comprised 2.1% of the population.

46.8% of residents lived in urban areas, while 53.2% lived in rural areas.

There were 11,155 households in the county, of which 26.9% had children under the age of 18 living in them. Of all households, 47.6% were married-couple households, 18.7% were households with a male householder and no spouse or partner present, and 26.5% were households with a female householder and no spouse or partner present. About 30.5% of all households were made up of individuals and 15.9% had someone living alone who was 65 years of age or older.

There were 12,511 housing units, of which 10.8% were vacant. Among occupied housing units, 77.1% were owner-occupied and 22.9% were renter-occupied. The homeowner vacancy rate was 2.0% and the rental vacancy rate was 9.1%.

=== Racial and ethnic composition ===
Montgomery County County, Illinois – Racial and ethnic composition Note: the US Census treats Hispanic/Latino as an ethnic category. This table excludes Latinos from the racial categories and assigns them to a separate category. Hispanics/Latinos may be of any race.
Race / Ethnicity (NH = Non-Hispanic)	Pop 1980	Pop 1990	Pop 2000	Pop 2010	Pop 2020	% 1980	% 1990	% 2000	% 2010	% 2020
White alone (NH)	21,665	20,089	28,928	28,334	25,709	97.74%	96.15%	94.38%	94.12%	90.88%
Black or African American alone (NH)	297	581	1,141	949	916	1.34%	2.78%	3.72%	3.15%	3.24%
Native American or Alaska Native alone (NH)	37	37	59	45	49	0.17%	0.18%	0.19%	0.15%	0.17%
Asian alone (NH)	26	31	67	111	131	0.12%	0.15%	0.22%	0.37%	0.46%
Native Hawaiian or Pacific Islander alone (NH)	x	x	5	11	7	x	x	0.02%	0.04%	0.02%
Other race alone (NH)	9	1	4	10	26	0.04%	0.00%	0.01%	0.03%	0.09%
Mixed race or Multiracial (NH)	x	x	122	185	863	x	x	0.40%	0.61%	3.05%
Hispanic or Latino (any race)	133	154	326	459	587	0.60%	0.74%	1.06%	1.52%	2.08%
Total	22,167	20,893	30,652	30,104	28,288	100.00%	100.00%	100.00%	100.00%	100.00%

=== 2010 census ===
As of the 2010 United States census, there were 30,104 people, 11,652 households, and 7,806 families living in the county. The population density was 42.8 inhabitants per square mile (16.5/km^{2}). There were 13,080 housing units at an average density of 18.6 per square mile (7.2/km^{2}). The racial makeup of the county was 95.1% white, 3.2% black or African American, 0.4% Asian, 0.2% American Indian, 0.5% from other races, and 0.7% from two or more races. Those of Hispanic or Latino origin made up 1.5% of the population. In terms of ancestry, 27.8% were German, 11.2% were Irish, 10.1% were English, and 9.8% were American.

Of the 11,652 households, 29.8% had children under the age of 18 living with them, 51.7% were married couples living together, 10.2% had a female householder with no husband present, 33.0% were non-families, and 28.4% of all households were made up of individuals. The average household size was 2.38 and the average family size was 2.87. The median age was 41.9 years.

The median income for a household in the county was $40,864 and the median income for a family was $56,945. Males had a median income of $40,749 versus $29,426 for females. The per capita income for the county was $21,700. About 10.9% of families and 14.0% of the population were below the poverty line, including 22.7% of those under age 18 and 7.4% of those age 65 or over.

== Communities ==
=== Cities ===
- Coffeen
- Hillsboro
- Litchfield
- Nokomis
- Witt

=== Villages ===
- Butler
- Coalton
- Donnellson
- Farmersville
- Fillmore
- Harvel
- Irving
- Ohlman
- Panama
- Raymond
- Schram City
- Taylor Springs
- Waggoner
- Walshville
- Wenonah

=== Unincorporated communities ===
- Chapman
- Honey Bend
- Van Burensburg
- Zanesville
- Zenobia

=== Townships ===
- Audubon Township
- Bois D'Arc Township
- Butler Grove Township
- East Fork Township
- Fillmore Township
- Grisham Township
- Harvel Township
- Hillsboro Township
- Irving Township
- Nokomis Township
- North Litchfield Township
- Pitman Township
- Raymond Township
- Rountree Township
- South Litchfield Township
- Walshville Township
- Witt Township
- Zanesville Township

=== Former Townships ===
- South Fillmore Township

== Notable people ==
- Donald T. Barry, nurse, businessman, and politician
- Avery Bourne, member of the Illinois House of Representatives
- Buddy Cole, jazz musician and composer
- Mortimer A. Cullen, politician in New York
- Harry Forrester, basketball and baseball coach
- Otto Funk (1868–1934), violinist
- John A. Graham, member of the Illinois Senate
- Betsy Hannig, member of the Illinois House of Representatives
- Mary Hartline, actress
- Glen Hobbie, baseball player
- Matt Hughes, UFC fighter
- Calvin Hultman, member of the Iowa House of Representatives
- Harold Osborn, track athlete
- Ray Richmond, baseball pitcher
- Red Ruffing, baseball player
- Walter Short, military officer

== Politics ==
United States presidential election results for Montgomery County, Illinois
Year	Republican		Democratic		Third party(ies)	
Year	No.	%	No.	%	No.	%
1892	2,935	41.01%	3,707	51.80%	515	7.20%
1896	3,622	46.02%	4,117	52.31%	132	1.68%
1900	3,583	45.43%	4,078	51.71%	225	2.85%
1904	3,489	47.98%	3,181	43.74%	602	8.28%
1908	3,782	45.64%	3,909	47.17%	596	7.19%
1912	1,476	18.20%	3,705	45.69%	2,928	36.11%
1916	7,065	44.65%	7,903	49.94%	856	5.41%
1920	7,429	52.92%	4,756	33.88%	1,854	13.21%
1924	8,022	47.26%	5,622	33.12%	3,331	19.62%
1928	8,999	54.29%	7,392	44.60%	184	1.11%
1932	5,945	34.71%	10,456	61.05%	725	4.23%
1936	8,140	42.92%	10,132	53.43%	692	3.65%
1940	10,497	51.65%	9,654	47.50%	174	0.86%
1944	8,989	52.74%	7,855	46.08%	201	1.18%
1948	8,348	50.73%	7,902	48.02%	205	1.25%
1952	10,014	54.95%	8,195	44.97%	16	0.09%
1956	9,945	56.36%	7,692	43.59%	8	0.05%
1960	9,178	50.97%	8,815	48.95%	14	0.08%
1964	6,425	37.78%	10,581	62.22%	0	0.00%
1968	7,547	46.19%	7,318	44.79%	1,474	9.02%
1972	9,025	56.71%	6,858	43.10%	30	0.19%
1976	7,379	46.56%	8,322	52.51%	147	0.93%
1980	8,947	58.04%	5,721	37.11%	747	4.85%
1984	8,191	56.08%	6,360	43.55%	54	0.37%
1988	6,388	46.43%	7,293	53.01%	78	0.57%
1992	4,407	29.70%	7,424	50.04%	3,006	20.26%
1996	4,770	37.76%	6,338	50.18%	1,523	12.06%
2000	6,226	47.55%	6,542	49.97%	325	2.48%
2004	6,851	52.99%	5,979	46.24%	100	0.77%
2008	6,150	47.64%	6,491	50.28%	268	2.08%
2012	6,776	55.60%	5,058	41.50%	354	2.90%
2016	8,630	66.50%	3,504	27.00%	844	6.50%
2020	9,544	69.36%	3,905	28.38%	312	2.27%
2024	9,378	70.80%	3,573	26.97%	295	2.23%

== See also ==
- National Register of Historic Places listings in Montgomery County, Illinois
