= Fillmore =

Fillmore may refer to:

== Places ==
=== Canada ===
- Fillmore, Saskatchewan
- Rural Municipality of Fillmore No. 96, Saskatchewan

=== United States ===
- Fillmore, California
- Fillmore District, San Francisco, California
- Fillmore, Louisiana
- Fillmore, Illinois
- Fillmore Township, Montgomery County, Illinois
- Fillmore, Indiana
- Fillmore Township, Iowa County, Iowa
- Fillmore, Kentucky
- Fillmore Township, Michigan
- Fillmore, Minnesota
- Fillmore County, Minnesota
- Fillmore Township, Fillmore County, Minnesota
- Fillmore, Missouri
- Fillmore County, Nebraska
- Fillmore, New York
- Fillmore, Ohio
- Fillmore, Oklahoma
- Fillmore, Pennsylvania
- Fillmore, Utah
- Fillmore, Wisconsin

== Venues ==
- Fillmore Auditorium (Denver), Colorado
- The Fillmore (Fillmore Auditorium), San Francisco, California promoter Bill Graham's original West Coast concert location
  - Fillmore East in New York City, New York, Bill Graham's East Coast concert location (1968 to 1971)
  - Fillmore West in San Francisco, California, Bill Graham's subsequent West Coast concert location (1968 to 1971)
  - The Fillmore Detroit in Detroit, Michigan
  - Irving Plaza, known as "The Fillmore New York" in the late 2000s
  - Theatre of Living Arts (TLA) in Philadelphia, Pennsylvania, briefly known as The Fillmore at TLA and referred to locally as The Fillmore Philadelphia
    - The Fillmore Philadelphia, a separate venue in the Fishtown neighborhood of Philadelphia that opened in late 2015
  - The Fillmore Silver Spring, a venue in Silver Spring, Maryland
  - The Fillmore Miami Beach, a venue in Miami Beach, Florida
  - AvidxChange Music Factory, home to a venue named the Fillmore Charlotte in Charlotte, North Carolina

== Fictional characters ==
- Fillmore (Cars), a character from Cars
- Fillmore, a character in Sherman's Lagoon
- Fillmore, a bear in Hoppity Hooper
- Cornelius C. Fillmore, a character from Fillmore!
- Fillmore, a pimp in The Warriors

== Other uses ==
- Fillmore (film), a 1971 music documentary
- Fillmore Block, a place in Wright County, Iowa
- Fillmore High School, a high school in Fillmore, California
- A song from ActRaiser

== People with the surname ==
- Charles Fillmore (Unity Church) (1854–1948), one of the founders of the Unity Church
- Charles J. Fillmore (1929–2014), linguist, (co-)inventor of Case Theory and Construction Grammar
- Frederick A. Fillmore (1856–1925), American composer and music publisher
- Henry Fillmore (1881–1956), American bandmaster and band composer
- Millard Fillmore (1800–1874), 13th president of the United States
  - Abigail Fillmore (1798–1853), first wife of Millard Fillmore
  - Caroline Fillmore (1813–1881), second wife of Millard Fillmore
- Nathaniel Fillmore (1771–1863), farmer and father of Millard Fillmore
- Walter Fillmore (1933–2017), Brigadier General, USMC Ret.

== See also ==
- Filmore (disambiguation)
- "Fillmore Jive", a song by Pavement from Crooked Rain, Crooked Rain
- Phillimore (disambiguation)
- Philmore, a Christian rock band
