= Cordell Hull as Secretary of State =

Cordell Hull
- Hull in 1940

47th United States Secretary of State
- In office March 4, 1933 – November 30, 1944
- President: Franklin D. Roosevelt
- Deputy: William Phillips (1933–1936); Sumner Welles (1937–1943); Edward Stettinius Jr. (1943–1944)
- Preceded by: Henry L. Stimson
- Succeeded by: Edward Stettinius Jr.

Cordell Hull served as the 47th United States secretary of state from March 4, 1933, to November 30, 1944, throughout the first three administrations of President Franklin D. Roosevelt. At nearly twelve years in office he remains the longest-serving secretary of state in American history. A Tennessee lawyer, judge, congressman and senator who had spent twenty-four years in Congress and had drafted the income-tax provisions of the Underwood Tariff Act of 1913, Hull was selected less for diplomatic experience than for his command of tariff policy, his standing with Southern Democrats and his support for Roosevelt at the 1932 Democratic National Convention.

Two achievements dominate his tenure. The first was the reciprocal trade agreements program. The Reciprocal Trade Agreements Act of June 12, 1934, which Hull piloted through Congress, shifted tariff-making from the logrolling of the House Ways and Means Committee to the executive branch and committed the United States to unconditional most-favored-nation treatment; between 1934 and 1945 the United States concluded thirty-two agreements with twenty-seven countries, and the same authority was later used to negotiate the General Agreement on Tariffs and Trade. The second was the postwar security organization. Hull led the American delegation to the Moscow Conference of October–November 1943, where the Declaration of the Four Nations pledged the great powers to establish a general international organization, and delivered the opening address at the Dumbarton Oaks Conference in 1944. He is generally described as the principal American architect of the United Nations; Roosevelt called him "the one person in all the world who has done his most to make this great plan for peace an effective fact", and the Norwegian Nobel Committee awarded him the 1945 Nobel Peace Prize.

Hull also gave the Good Neighbor policy much of its substance. He was the first sitting secretary of state to attend an International Conference of American States, announcing at Montevideo in December 1933 that the United States would henceforth observe a policy of non-intervention, and he supervised the abrogation of the Platt Amendment, the withdrawal of the Marines from Haiti and a series of hemispheric declarations that left nearly all of Latin America aligned with the United States by 1942. His notes to Mexico in 1938, insisting that expropriation of foreign property required "prompt, adequate and effective" compensation, produced the "Hull formula", which remains central to the international law of investment.

Hull's influence was nevertheless narrower than his office implied. Roosevelt conducted the most important relationships himself, excluded Hull from the recognition of the Soviet Union in 1933, from the lend-lease and Atlantic Charter negotiations of 1940–1941, and from the wartime summit conferences, and habitually worked through Hull's nominal deputy, Under Secretary Sumner Welles. Hull came to detest Welles and forced his resignation in September 1943. His own health was failing throughout: he suffered from sarcoidosis, was hospitalized at the Bethesda Naval Hospital in October 1944, and resigned the following month.

Hull's judgments are contested. He believed that the world's economic war had caused its political war, took the "have-not" rhetoric of Hitler and Mussolini largely at face value, and blamed British imperial preference for global instability; colleagues such as Harold L. Ickes and Henry Morgenthau Jr. charged that his department was timid and conventional, and that trade agreements were useless "with the world in turmoil". The refugee policies administered by his Department — the turning away of the SS St. Louis in 1939, the suppression of the Riegner telegram in 1942, the failure of the Bermuda Conference in 1943 — have drawn near-universal condemnation from historians. And the document he handed the Japanese ambassador on November 26, 1941, the "Hull note", remains at the center of an unresolved argument about whether it was an ultimatum that precipitated Pearl Harbor or a tentative offer that Japan's leaders chose to misrepresent.

== Background and appointment ==
Hull was born in a log cabin in what is now Pickett County, Tennessee, on October 2, 1871. He read law at Cumberland University, served as a captain in the Spanish–American War, sat in the Tennessee House of Representatives, and held a circuit judgeship before his election to Congress in 1906. Eleven terms in the House (1907–1921, 1923–1931) and one in the Senate (1931–1933) made him the Democratic Party's leading authority on taxation and tariffs. On the Ways and Means Committee he wrote the income-tax sections of the Underwood Tariff Act of 1913 "almost singlehandedly", and he spent his congressional career arguing that high tariffs taxed the poor, invited retaliation against American farm exports, and made war more likely.

After the outbreak of the First World War Hull became convinced that European protectionism had been a principal cause of the conflict, and in February 1916 introduced a resolution calling for a peace conference coupled with the abolition of trade barriers. He supported Woodrow Wilson's League of Nations in 1919, chaired the Democratic National Committee from 1921 to 1924, and was a candidate for the presidential nomination in 1928. He backed Roosevelt in 1932, and the State Department portfolio was his reward — the Office of the Historian of the Department of State notes that Roosevelt appointed him "in return for his backing and in order to firm up his support amongst Southern Democrats". The Senate confirmed him, and he took office on March 4, 1933, the day of Roosevelt's first inauguration.

Hull arrived with a settled economic creed. As he wrote in his memoirs, recalling the post-1918 years: "From then on, to me, unhampered trade dovetailed with peace; high tariffs, trade barriers, and unfair economic competition, with war." Contemporaries described a soft-spoken, courtly, deeply religious man — known in Washington as "Parsons Hull" — whose public gentleness concealed an obstinate temper and, in private, a gift for profanity that one observer called a "transcendent talent for picturesque profanity".

== The Department and its personnel ==
Hull occupied the corner office in the State–War–Navy Building beside the White House (today the Eisenhower Executive Office Building, where the room is still named for him), and ran the Department six days a week. His under secretaries were William Phillips (1933–1936), Sumner Welles (1937–1943) and Edward Stettinius Jr. (from October 1943). Around him were Assistant Secretary Francis B. Sayre, Woodrow Wilson's son-in-law, who administered the trade-agreements program; R. Walton Moore as counsellor; Stanley K. Hornbeck, chief of the Division of Far Eastern Affairs; Adolf A. Berle as assistant secretary from 1938; Breckinridge Long (1940–1944), who controlled the visa and refugee functions; Green H. Hackworth as legal adviser; and Dean Acheson, assistant secretary from 1941, who administered the financial measures against Japan.

Postwar planning was institutionalized inside the Department during Hull's tenure. An Advisory Committee on Post-War Foreign Policy was created in December 1939 under Welles; a second Advisory Committee on Postwar Foreign Policy, chaired by Hull himself, was established in February 1942. On January 15, 1944, Hull announced "far-reaching changes in the organization of the Department of State to facilitate the conduct of the foreign relations of the United States, in war and in peace" — Departmental Order 1218 — which freed the assistant secretaries from administrative duties and created a Policy Committee, a Committee on Postwar Programs and an Advisory Council on Postwar Foreign Policy. Further reorganization on December 20, 1944, under Stettinius, grouped the geographic offices beneath the assistant secretaries. The Department's own history of postwar preparation, Postwar Foreign Policy Preparation, 1939–1945, treats Hull's tenure as the period in which the machinery of American postwar policy was built.

Hull's friction with other agencies was constant. He resented Nelson Rockefeller's Office of the Coordinator of Inter-American Affairs, created in August 1940, as an invasion of the Department's Latin American responsibilities, and he fought Treasury over China, Germany, refugees and postwar economic arrangements.

== Working with Roosevelt ==
Roosevelt, in the assessment of most historians, acted as his own secretary of state. He kept the relationships he considered important — Britain, France, the Soviet Union, Germany, and, after 1940, Japan in its strategic dimension — in his own hands, and left Hull the Department's administration and the Latin American republics. When Roosevelt recognized the Soviet Union in November 1933, he excluded Hull and the Department from the negotiations with Maxim Litvinov, reasoning that Hull's religious convictions made him unsuitable to deal with an atheist state; the talks were conducted by Roosevelt's friend William C. Bullitt.

From 1937 the president's most trusted adviser at the Department was Under Secretary Sumner Welles, a Groton and Harvard man and a childhood friend of Roosevelt's. Hull regarded Welles as a usurper of his functions and, according to the historian Irwin Gellman, came to hate him. Roosevelt's habit of bypassing his secretary of state was not merely institutional. In 1940 the president considered Hull as a possible vice-presidential candidate; Hull refused, objecting both to the powerlessness of the office and to Roosevelt's third term, and the episode strained their relations through the election. At the 1940 convention Ickes urged Roosevelt to dismiss Hull as "a disaster"; Roosevelt replied that Hull had been a good secretary of state, and Ickes recorded his own verdict in his diary: "he goes about looking like an early Christian martyr and the people think that he is wonderful just on the basis of his looks."

Hull was loyal to Roosevelt and to the party and rarely expressed dissent publicly. He privately considered much of the New Deal an overreach of Jeffersonian limits, denouncing Morgenthau, Ickes and Henry A. Wallace as "the extreme left-wing fringe people" and "social welfarers", while paying tribute in his memoirs to Roosevelt as "one of the greatest social reformers in our modern history". In his memoirs he also recorded his frustration that his proposals to sit on the high-level war councils combining diplomatic and military direction were ignored by the president, who preferred informal advisers and the military chiefs.

== The London Economic Conference of 1933 ==
Hull's first major assignment was also his first humiliation. Roosevelt named him chairman of the American delegation to the London Monetary and Economic Conference, which opened on June 12, 1933, with 66 nations represented, to address depression, trade and exchange rates. Hull had been instructed not to enter into discussions of currency stabilization; Roosevelt then permitted American experts, Oliver M. W. Sprague and James Paul Warburg, to negotiate a temporary stabilization arrangement with Montagu Norman of the Bank of England and Clément Moret of the Banque de France, drafted by June 15. When the plan leaked, the dollar rose and American markets fell; Roosevelt rejected it on June 17, criticized stabilization publicly on June 30, and on July 3 sent the conference a message denouncing its preoccupation with exchange rates when "broader problems" were at stake and attacking "the fetishes of so-called international bankers".

The conference never recovered, and adjourned on July 27 without substantive agreement. Hull, who had staked his opening months in office on an internationalist economic program, was publicly rebuked by the president he served. John Maynard Keynes hailed Roosevelt's decision as "magnificently right"; Hull was privately bitter at the public reversal of the program he had been sent to build, but he stayed in office. The episode established the pattern of the next eleven years: Hull supplied the doctrine and the labor, Roosevelt the decisions.

== The reciprocal trade agreements program ==
=== The Reciprocal Trade Agreements Act ===
Tariff reduction was Hull's life's work, and it became the administration's foreign economic policy. After the Smoot–Hawley Tariff of 1930 and the retaliatory measures it provoked, Hull argued that recovery required an expansion of exports and that the United States could obtain foreign concessions only by offering reciprocal reductions of its own. The Reciprocal Trade Agreements Act, signed on June 12, 1934, authorized the president to negotiate bilateral agreements and to proclaim tariff reductions of up to fifty percent, for three years, without further congressional approval; agreements were to be announced rather than submitted to the Senate as treaties.

The statute was an institutional revolution. As the standard history of American trade policy puts it, it broke the cycle of logrolling in which members traded votes on individual schedules, and it transferred the political weight of protectionism from a committee to an executive branch obliged to weigh the national interest. The act was renewed in 1937, 1940, 1943 and 1945. Hull relied on Sayre and on an interdepartmental Committee on Trade Agreements, publishing the terms of proposed agreements and holding public hearings before signature.

=== The program in operation ===
Between 1934 and 1945 the United States signed thirty-two reciprocal trade agreements with twenty-seven countries; American duties on foreign products, on one measure, fell from an average of forty-six percent in 1934 to twelve percent by 1962. The agreements were bilateral but general: concessions were extended to all countries receiving unconditional most-favored-nation treatment, so that each agreement lowered barriers multilaterally — a device Hull insisted upon against protectionists who preferred the old, bargaining-lever version of the clause.

Hull's crowning effort was an agreement with Great Britain, which he regarded as the "central point or spearhead" of a world program. Negotiations dragged through 1937 and 1938 against the obstacle of imperial preference established by the Ottawa Agreements of 1932, and the Anglo-American trade agreement was signed on November 17, 1938, weeks after Munich. Arthur W. Schatz's study of the negotiations describes them as Hull's "search for peace": the secretary of state believed that an Anglo-American economic bloc, by demonstrating the profitability of open trade, would draw Germany and Japan back into the world economy and remove the economic motive for aggression. In January 1936 he told the British ambassador, Sir Ronald Lindsay, that imperial preference had caused the Second Italo-Ethiopian War, Mussolini having been squeezed into aggression by the protectionism of others, and he predicted that Germany would attack its neighbors if the trade war continued.

=== Trade as an instrument of peace ===
The theory cut across other departments. Hull fought Morgenthau over Chinese silver, warning that a Treasury program to strengthen the yuan would provoke Japan — Roosevelt sided with Treasury, and the Sino-American agreement of May 1936 was concluded without the Department. He protested still more sharply when Morgenthau used the "dumping" provisions of American tariff law against German exports in June 1936, arguing that raising rates against the world's second-largest economy would confirm the protectionism he was trying to dismantle; Roosevelt again backed Treasury.

Ickes was dismissive of the whole enterprise. Reciprocal trade agreements "were all right so far as they went", he wrote, "but as I had remarked to the President on more than one occasion, with the world in turmoil they [were] like hunting an elephant in the jungle with a fly swatter". Morgenthau judged the Department "timorous" and "conventional", its career diplomats afflicted with a "foreign office mentality — the notion you can get things done by being a generous host at diplomatic banquets".

=== Legacy ===
The program outlived the peace it was meant to secure. Article VII of the Anglo-American Mutual Aid Agreement of February 23, 1942, committed the two governments to work toward the elimination of discriminatory treatment and of quantitative restrictions after the war — a pledge pressed by Hull's economists and regarded as the bridge from the reciprocal trade program to the postwar order. The authority Hull obtained in 1934 was the authority under which the United States concluded the General Agreement on Tariffs and Trade in 1947, and historians credit him with establishing the institutional architecture of liberal trade policy for the second half of the twentieth century.

== The Good Neighbor policy ==
=== Montevideo and non-intervention ===
Roosevelt announced the Good Neighbor policy in his first inaugural address; Hull built it. At the Seventh International Conference of American States in Montevideo (December 3–26, 1933) he became the first sitting secretary of state to attend an inter-American conference, and announced that the United States would henceforth observe a policy of non-intervention in the affairs of its neighbors. The Convention on the Rights and Duties of States, signed on December 26, 1933 with Hull as chairman of the American delegation, provided in Article 8 that "no state has the right to intervene in the internal or external affairs of another". Hull also used the conference to press his trade program, winning what Encyclopædia Britannica calls his first presidential support and public acclaim for reciprocal trade agreements.

=== Cuba, Haiti and the end of intervention ===
The new policy required giving up specific rights. By the Treaty of Relations signed on May 29, 1934, the United States abrogated the Platt Amendment, retaining only the lease of Guantánamo Bay; the Marines left Haiti in August 1934. In 1936 the United States negotiated the Hull–Alfaro treaty with Panama, surrendering the right of intervention granted by the 1903 canal treaty, though the Senate did not ratify it until 1939.

=== Buenos Aires, Lima and Panama ===
Hull attended the Inter-American Conference for the Maintenance of Peace at Buenos Aires in November–December 1936, to which Roosevelt traveled — the first president to visit South America in office — and which produced a convention for the maintenance of peace and an additional protocol reaffirming Article 8 of the Montevideo Convention. At the Eighth International Conference of American States in Lima (December 7–27, 1938) he secured the Declaration of Lima of December 24, 1938, a compromise with the Argentine foreign minister that substituted a consultation mechanism for the binding treaty he had wanted, committing the republics to consult and to cooperate against foreign intervention or subversion.

After the outbreak of war in Europe, the First Meeting of Consultation of Foreign Ministers at Panama (September 23 – October 3, 1939) adopted the Declaration of Panama, creating a maritime "security zone" of roughly 300 miles off the American coasts in which belligerent operations were declared contrary to hemispheric interests.

=== Havana and the fall of France ===
The collapse of France in June 1940 raised the prospect that Germany would inherit French and Dutch possessions in the Caribbean. At the Second Meeting of Consultation at Havana (July 21–30, 1940) Hull secured the Act of Havana, signed July 30, 1940, providing for the provisional inter-American administration of any European colony in the Americas whose sovereignty might be transferred to another non-American power, together with a declaration of reciprocal assistance. The Act was the high-water mark of hemispheric solidarity under Hull's direction, and it foreclosed the transfer of Western Hemisphere colonies to the Axis.

=== Rio and the war ===
At the Third Meeting of the Foreign Ministers of the American Republics in Rio de Janeiro (January 15–28, 1942), weeks after Pearl Harbor, Hull led the American delegation in pressing every republic to break relations with the Axis. Argentina resisted; the conference produced a recommendation rather than an obligation, and most republics severed relations within weeks. Throughout the period Hull also contended with Nelson Rockefeller's Coordinator of Inter-American Affairs, whose independent information, cultural and commercial apparatus in Latin America he regarded as a rival to the Department's.

=== The "Hull formula" and Mexico ===
The policy had limits. After Lázaro Cárdenas expropriated the foreign oil companies in March 1938, and after years of uncompensated agrarian expropriations affecting American landholders, Hull corresponded with the Mexican foreign minister, Eduardo Hay. Hay conceded Mexico's responsibility but insisted there was "no rule universally accepted in theory nor carried out in practice which makes obligatory the payment of immediate compensation". In his note of August 22, 1938, Hull replied that under international law no government may expropriate private property "without provision for prompt, adequate and effective payment".

The exchange gave international law the "Hull formula" (or Hull rule), which has been incorporated into a large body of bilateral investment treaties and which is still contested by states adhering to the Calvo doctrine, under which compensation is a matter for the host state's own law. The tension between the two positions remains a central issue in the law of international investment.

== The aggressor states, 1933–1939 ==
=== Non-recognition and the Far East ===
Hull maintained the Stimson Doctrine of non-recognition toward Manchukuo and protested Japan's advance in China from 1937, but the Department's response was limited to diplomatic notes and, from July 1, 1938, a "moral embargo": Hull asked American manufacturers and exporters of aircraft and aircraft parts not to sell to Japan, and on December 20, 1939 extended the appeal to materials used in producing aviation gasoline. In December 1937 the USS Panay was sunk by Japanese aircraft on the Yangtze; Hull handled the protest and extracted a formal apology and indemnity, but declined to join Britain in sanctions.

Roosevelt's "quarantine speech" of October 5, 1937, whose language had passed through the Department, produced an isolationist storm; the president refused to define what quarantine meant, and the episode left Hull's Department to absorb the political fallout. At the Brussels Conference of November 1937 the American delegation was instructed to avoid commitments.

=== Neutrality legislation ===
Hull regarded the Neutrality Acts of 1935, 1936 and 1937 as dangerously rigid, since an undiscriminating embargo fell hardest on the victims of aggression, but he administered them faithfully. During the Spanish Civil War he favored strict neutrality, an arms embargo against both sides, and the refusal of passports to Americans wishing to serve in the International Brigades — a decision that Ickes recorded with shame, and that Morgenthau and Ickes believed amounted to aiding the Nationalists, who were supplied by Germany and Italy. Roosevelt chose Hull's course.

=== Ethiopia, Germany and Italy ===
The United States declined to join League of Nations sanctions against Italy in 1935, limiting itself to appeals to exporters. Hull's exchange with Fiorello La Guardia's critics in Berlin illustrates his method: after the Nazi press organ Der Angriff called the mayor a "Jewish ruffian" for proposing to feature Nazis in a "chamber of horrors" at the World's Fair, Hull sent Berlin a letter of regret for intemperate comment on both sides while explaining the principle of free speech; when Nazi propaganda escalated to describing American women as "prostitutes", he sent a protest that drew an explanation but no apology.

=== Munich and the response ===
Hull welcomed the Munich Agreement of September 1938 as a reprieve and urged the administration to use it constructively; his constructive answer was commercial. The Anglo-American trade agreement followed on November 17, 1938. Ickes, writing of Hull's record generally, listed "our sale of scrap iron and oil to Japan, our refusal to sell munitions of war to Spain, and our holding back on Spain and Austria... Munich and the disposition of our State Department to let Chamberlain dictate our policy on foreign affairs".

=== Repeal of the arms embargo, 1939 ===
When war came in Europe, Hull's principal legislative task was to undo the mandatory arms embargo. After the House refused on June 30, 1939 to repeal it, he and Roosevelt issued an eleven-page statement urging reconsideration, setting out Hull's six-point program; Roosevelt called a special session on September 21, and the Neutrality Act of November 4, 1939 substituted "cash-and-carry" for the embargo, a change that materially aided Britain and France.

== Refugees and the Holocaust ==
The refugee policies of the Roosevelt administration were administered by the State Department, and Hull's record has become the most severely criticized aspect of his tenure. Immigration quotas were set by Congress, but their administration — the visa regulations, the instruction of consuls, the handling of relief funds and of reports of extermination — lay with Hull and his subordinates, notably Assistant Secretary Breckinridge Long.

Gellman notes a paradox in Hull's position: his wife, Rose Frances (Witz) Whitney, was from a Jewish family of Staunton, Virginia, a fact Hull kept quiet in a Tennessee where fundamentalist Protestantism and the Ku Klux Klan were powerful. In Gellman's account, Hull's marriage made him unwilling to do anything that could be portrayed as championing Jewish interests at the expense of American ones.

In June 1939 the German liner SS St. Louis, carrying 936 Jewish refugees refused landing in Cuba, anchored off Florida. Hull advised Roosevelt to refuse entry, telling Morgenthau on June 5 that the passengers could not lawfully be issued tourist visas because they had no return addresses and that the matter lay between the Cuban government and the passengers. When Morgenthau asked on June 6 whether it was "proper to have the Coast Guard look for it", Hull agreed, adding only that he did not suppose Morgenthau would want the search reported in the newspapers. The ship returned to Europe; historians estimate that 254 of its passengers were later murdered by the Nazis. In September 1940 Eleanor Roosevelt worked around Hull's refusal of visas for Jewish refugees aboard the Portuguese ship SS Quanza, who landed in Virginia on September 11.

Wartime restrictions required the signatures of both Treasury and State for money to be sent abroad. In the case of funds raised by American Jews for Jews in Romanian-occupied Transnistria, Morgenthau signed at once; the State Department "delayed, delayed, and delayed, as more Jews were dying in the Transnistria camps". In August 1942 the Riegner telegram, reporting the Nazi plan to exterminate European Jewry, was withheld from Stephen S. Wise and the American Jewish community by order of the Department, which instructed its legation in Bern not to transmit such messages. In July 1943 the Department blocked a Romanian proposal to release some 70,000 Jews in exchange for payment. The Bermuda Conference of April 1943, convened by the United States and Britain, produced no rescue program; its agenda, settled by Hull's Department, excluded changes to immigration quotas and to shipping allocations.

In January 1944 Morgenthau presented Roosevelt with a report titled "Personal Report to the Secretary on the Acquiescence of This Government in the Murder of the Jews". Roosevelt responded by creating the War Refugee Board on January 22, 1944, over the Department's objections; Hull nevertheless sat on its board of directors alongside Morgenthau and Stimson. Hull also resisted the punishment of atrocity. He tried to prevent Herbert Pell from serving as the American delegate to the United Nations War Crimes Commission and hindered his work thereafter, objecting that trying German officials for crimes against German citizens violated international law and German sovereignty and would set a precedent usable against American officials — Hull noted that under Pell's definition of crimes against humanity, officials who tolerated the lynching of Black Americans in the South might themselves be tried. Pell was obliged to narrow the concept to atrocities committed in connection with aggressive war.

== Japan and the road to Pearl Harbor ==
=== Sanctions ===
Roosevelt directed Hull to conduct relations with Japan, a delegation that reflected the president's low estimate of the portfolio's importance; Hull negotiated while Roosevelt attended elsewhere. When Japan occupied northern French Indochina on September 24, 1940, the cabinet divided: Morgenthau, Stimson and Ickes wanted crippling sanctions, while Hull, backed by Navy Secretary Frank Knox, the admirals and Ambassador Joseph Grew, warned that sanctions would drive Japan into Southeast Asia to seize the resources it lacked. Roosevelt compromised, embargoing scrap iron and steel but, at Hull's urging, excluding oil — while warning that occupation of southern Indochina would bring an oil embargo.

Japan occupied southern Indochina in July 1941. The United States froze Japanese assets on July 26, and Britain, the Dominions and the Dutch government-in-exile followed, cutting Japan off from oil. The licensing regime that turned the freeze into an embargo was administered in the Department by Dean Acheson, who shifted policy toward what one historian calls "full-blooded financial warfare against Japan"; Hull and the president appear to have expected that licenses would be granted.

=== The negotiations of 1941 ===
Hull's opposite numbers were Ambassador Kichisaburō Nomura and, from mid-November, the special envoy Saburō Kurusu. Nomura presented Proposal A on November 6 and Proposal B on November 20; the Americans, reading Japan's diplomatic traffic through Magic, knew that Proposal B was a last offer. Hull drafted a three-month modus vivendi under which Japan would withdraw from southern Indochina in exchange for limited oil shipments, but abandoned it after protests from Chiang Kai-shek, from Churchill, and from Morgenthau and Ickes inside the administration; Ickes recorded his pleasure at "the strenuous intervention of Churchill and Chiang Kai-shek" in blocking "the appeasers in the State Department".

=== The Hull note ===
On November 26, 1941, Hull handed Nomura the document known as the Hull note, formally the "Outline of Proposed Basis for Agreement Between the United States and Japan". The text, prepared in the Department with input from Harry Dexter White of the Treasury and from Hornbeck, had two parts: a draft mutual declaration of policy resting on nine principles (territorial integrity, non-interference, equality of commercial opportunity, pacific settlement, non-discrimination, access to raw materials), and ten "steps", including a multilateral non-aggression pact, the withdrawal of all Japanese military, naval, air and police forces from China and Indochina, support for no government in China other than that of Chiang Kai-shek, the abandonment of extraterritorial rights in China, negotiation of a trade agreement on a most-favored-nation basis, the lifting of the freezing restrictions and the stabilization of the dollar–yen rate.

Prime Minister Tōjō Hideki told his cabinet "this is an ultimatum", although the note was marked tentative, carried no deadline, and did not define "China" — leaving ambiguous whether Manchukuo was included. Foreign Minister Tōgō Shigenori knew the note was not an ultimatum and said nothing. Herbert P. Bix argues that the very name "Hull note" misleads, since an ultimatum by definition sets a deadline, and that Hull was in fact prepared to make generous concessions to avoid war; Eri Hotta writes that both sides understood the text would have to be modified. Hull himself recorded: "we had no serious thought that Japan would accept our proposal." On November 27 Nomura and Kurusu met Roosevelt and Hull in the Oval Office; when Nomura suggested modifying the note, Hull replied that modification would not be considered "unless the opposition to the peace element in control of the Government should make up its mind definitively to act and talk and move in a peaceful direction". The Department's press conference that day stated that American diplomacy had gone as far as it could and that the rest was Japan's choice. The Pearl Harbor strike force had sailed on the morning of November 26, Japan time.

=== December 7, 1941 ===
Hull learned of the attack while Nomura and Kurusu waited outside his office to deliver a fourteen-part message terminating the negotiations, whose contents he had already read in intercepts. He refused to shake their hands and told aides: "In all my fifty years of public service, I have never seen such a document that was more crowded with infamous falsehood and distortion." The rebuke became one of the war's most quoted American diplomatic scenes, and Hull's public standing rose as he became, through dozens of radio addresses — among them a July 23, 1942 broadcast warning Americans of the Axis powers — the administration's principal explainer of the war's political purposes.

== Wartime diplomacy ==
=== The Declaration by United Nations ===
Hull described in his memoirs the drafting of the Declaration by United Nations, signed on January 1, 1942, by which twenty-six governments pledged their resources to the defeat of the Axis and to the principles of the Atlantic Charter. Roosevelt signed first, Hull second, Harry Hopkins third, and the remaining signatories followed at the Department. The Declaration supplied both the alliance's name and the legal basis of the organization Hull was to build.

=== Vichy and the Free French ===
Hull's hostility to Charles de Gaulle shaped American policy toward France and damaged his reputation. When Free French forces seized Saint-Pierre and Miquelon from Vichy on December 24, 1941, Hull lodged a furious protest, referred to de Gaulle's ships as "the so-called Free French", and asked that the Vichy governor be restored. The American press mocked the "so-called Secretary of State"; the islands remained Free French for the rest of the war. He was, in the judgment of the standard account, the American official most hostile to the Free French movement, regarding de Gaulle as an unscrupulous adventurer whose word could not be trusted, and he continued to maneuver against him thereafter. He defended the administration's maintenance of relations with Vichy and the Darlan arrangement of 1942, crediting it with bringing General Henri Giraud's forces over to the Allies in North Africa.

=== Exclusion from strategy ===
Throughout the war Hull remained central to formal diplomacy — in Latin America, in the Far East, and above all in postwar planning — while the great strategic decisions were made by Roosevelt with the military chiefs and with Hopkins. He did not attend the Casablanca or Tehran conferences; he accompanied the president to the First Quebec Conference in August 1943.

=== Empire and decolonization ===
Hull was less sympathetic to colonial self-determination than Roosevelt. In 1942, when the president pressed Churchill to promise Indian independence, Hull told the British ambassador, Lord Halifax, that he opposed independence for "backward peoples" incapable of governing themselves, and suggested that Britain make withdrawal conditional on an independent India's immediate declaration of war against the Axis — a condition Gandhi's pacifism made impossible. When Wendell Willkie, on his much-publicized 1942 "one world" tour, attacked American immigration law in Chongqing and called for the end of European imperialism in Asia, Hull sent Roosevelt an angry memorandum denouncing Willkie as a "troublemaking person" creating "misunderstanding" among the Allies, and insisted that the model for decolonization was the Philippines, whose independence the United States had legislated in 1935.

=== China ===
Hull was a consistent supporter of Chiang Kai-shek's government as the legitimate government of China — a position written into the Hull note — and of China's elevation to great-power status, which he pressed on reluctant British and Soviet counterparts at Moscow in 1943 and again at Dumbarton Oaks in 1944. In the 1944 dispute between Chiang and General Joseph W. Stilwell, Hull backed Chiang; Roosevelt recalled Stilwell in October.

=== Postwar Germany ===
In September 1944 Hull joined Stimson in opposing Morgenthau's plan to reduce Germany to an agricultural state, warning Roosevelt that it would stiffen German resistance and prolong the war. The plan was shelved within weeks.

== Building the United Nations ==
=== Postwar planning ===
Hull's Department began planning the postwar order in 1939. He chaired the Advisory Committee on Postwar Foreign Policy established in February 1942, and in mid-1943 he and his staff produced a draft charter for a general international organization. Hull's objective was to avoid the fate of the League: an organization with the great powers inside it, resting on a continuing wartime alliance, and backed by a liberalized trading system. He also worked to secure bipartisan support, and the Connally Resolution — Senate Resolution 192, adopted on November 5, 1943, favoring United States participation in an international organization to maintain peace — was understood in Washington as the Senate's endorsement of the policy Hull had pursued.

=== Moscow, 1943 ===
The Third Moscow Conference of October 18 – November 11, 1943, was the first meeting of the American, British and Soviet foreign ministers. Hull, aged 72 and in visibly poor health, flew via Cairo and Tehran, where he met the Shah and Anthony Eden. In twelve sessions with Eden and Vyacheslav Molotov he secured the Moscow Declarations of October 30, 1943: the Declaration of the Four Nations on General Security — signed also by the Chinese ambassador to the Soviet Union, Foo Ping-sheung, at Hull's insistence — pledging continued wartime cooperation and the establishment at the earliest practicable date of a general international organization; declarations on Italy and Austria; and a Statement on Atrocities committing the Allies to return accused war criminals to the countries where their crimes were committed. The conference also created the European Advisory Commission. In a private meeting Stalin assured Hull "clearly and unequivocally" that once Germany was defeated the Soviet Union would join the Allies against Japan.

Moscow was Hull's greatest diplomatic triumph and, in his own account, the vindication of the organization he had wanted since 1919. He reported to the press that the declarations neither compromised nor superseded the Atlantic Charter but reinforced it.

=== Dumbarton Oaks, 1944 ===
The Dumbarton Oaks Conference — formally the Washington Conversations on International Peace and Security Organization — met at the Harvard-owned estate in Washington from August 21 to October 7, 1944, and was the first step taken to implement paragraph 4 of the Moscow Declaration. Hull delivered the opening address; the American delegation was chaired by Under Secretary Stettinius, with Alexander Cadogan and then Lord Halifax for Britain, Andrei Gromyko for the Soviet Union and Wellington Koo for China. Because the Soviets would not meet the Chinese, the conversations ran in two phases: August 21 – September 28 with the Soviet Union, and September 29 – October 7 with China. The delegates agreed on October 7 to the Proposals for the Establishment of a General International Organization, settling, in Charles Bohlen's phrase, "all but two issues regarding the organization of the United Nations — the voting procedure in the Security Council and the Soviet pressure for the admission of all sixteen of the Soviet republics to the General Assembly". Hull's deteriorating health confined his participation largely to the opening weeks.

The remaining questions were resolved at Yalta in February 1945 and the Charter was signed at San Francisco on June 26, 1945, after Hull had left office.

== The Hull–Welles feud ==
The central personal conflict of Hull's tenure was with Sumner Welles. Welles, assistant secretary for Latin American affairs from 1933 and under secretary from 1937, was Roosevelt's friend and confidant, and from 1937 he, rather than Hull, dominated the Department. Welles's mission to Europe in February–March 1940, undertaken on the president's initiative, deepened Hull's sense that his office had been hollowed out.

In 1943 Hull ended Welles's career. Reports of Welles's solicitation of two male Pullman porters in 1941 — conduct that had previously been managed inside the administration — reached Hull, who pressed Roosevelt to remove him, reportedly threatening to resign and warning that the material exposed Welles to blackmail. Roosevelt accepted Welles's resignation effective September 30, 1943, announced in late August. Time reported that the forced resignation "made one thing unmistakably clear: in the archaic rookery that houses the U.S. State Department Cordell Hull is boss", while The New York Times judged that Welles's passing had been made inevitable by the move Hull had long prepared.

The victory was costly. A contemporary review of Gellman's study of the triangle of Roosevelt, Hull and Welles concluded that by forcing Welles out Hull "opened up a void in the State Department that Hull was incapable of filling". Stettinius, a former U.S. Steel chairman with no diplomatic experience, became under secretary in October 1943 and secretary in December 1944. Gellman's broader account treats the three men as each guarding a secret: Roosevelt's paralysis, Welles's sexuality, and Hull's fatal illness — the last explaining why Hull endured a decade of marginalization in the hope of accomplishing something in world affairs before he died.

== Illness and resignation ==
Hull suffered for decades from familial remitting-relapsing sarcoidosis, long confused with tuberculosis, and guarded the diagnosis as closely as he guarded his other liabilities. By 1943 his frailty was apparent at Moscow; by 1944 it was disabling. In October 1944 he entered the Bethesda Naval Hospital, where he was kept under observation and treatment for a throat ailment and exhaustion, and Stettinius carried the double burden of under secretary and acting secretary.

On November 21, 1944, Hull sent Roosevelt his resignation: "It is with inexpressible disappointment that I find it necessary, for considerations of health, to retire from public service." Roosevelt accepted it and announced the appointment of Stettinius on November 27, 1944 — within three hours naming a successor, and disappointing James F. Byrnes, who had expected the post. Hull's resignation took effect on November 30, 1944; Stettinius was confirmed by the Senate that day and sworn in on December 1, and Joseph C. Grew was nominated under secretary on December 4. Hull had served eleven years and nine months, longer than any secretary of state before or since.

Roosevelt's tribute was unqualified: Hull was "the one person in all the world who has done his most to make this great plan for peace an effective fact".

== Nobel Peace Prize and later years ==
Hull had been nominated for the Nobel Peace Prize several times in the second half of the 1930s for his Latin American policy and his trade agreements. The Norwegian Nobel Committee awarded him the 1945 prize "for his indefatigable work for international understanding and his pivotal role in establishing the United Nations", describing him as "the man known as the father of the United Nations" and drawing the parallel with Wilson's 1920 prize as architect of the League. He was too ill to travel to receive it.

He remained a public figure. He served as a delegate to the San Francisco Conference in 1945, though, as he wrote, "being still in the Naval Hospital, I was unable to take a large share in the proceedings at San Francisco". In January 1948 Macmillan published The Memoirs of Cordell Hull in two volumes, an extensive and selectively candid account of his twelve years at the Department. He died at the Bethesda Naval Hospital on July 23, 1955, aged 83, and is buried in the Washington National Cathedral.

== Historical assessment ==
Hull's defenders emphasize three durable accomplishments. The reciprocal trade program ended congressional tariff-making and created the institutional basis of the postwar trading order; the Good Neighbor policy converted a hemisphere of resentful neighbors into allies, without which the security of the Americas and the supply lines of 1942–1945 would have been far more precarious; and the United Nations, from the Moscow Declaration to Dumbarton Oaks, was more consistently Hull's project than anyone else's in the American government. Julius W. Pratt's two-volume Cordell Hull, 1933–44 (1964) remains the standard study and is broadly sympathetic; Michael A. Butler's Cautious Visionary (1998) takes Hull's trade program seriously as intellectual history rather than as naïveté.

His critics make four charges. First, that he was too easily bypassed: Roosevelt made the decisions, Welles had the access, and Hull's response was endurance rather than assertion — David M. Kennedy describes him as "a plodding bureaucrat", hard-working and efficient but dull, dour and a poor speaker. Second, that his diagnosis of the 1930s was wrong: he accepted the aggressor states' self-description as "have-not" nations, wrote in 1936 that fascism was "the characteristic expression of great peoples in revolt against the limitations placed upon their national prosperity by their poverty in natural resources", and located the cause of war in Ottawa rather than in Berlin, Rome or Tokyo. Third, that his Department's refugee and war-crimes record was a moral failure, from the St. Louis and Bermuda to the obstruction of Herbert Pell. Fourth, that the destruction of Welles left the Department weaker than he had found it.

The Hull note continues to generate argument. Japanese nationalist historiography treats it as an ultimatum that left Tokyo no choice but war; Bix and Hotta hold that it was neither an ultimatum nor a surprise to either government, that Tōjō misrepresented it to his own cabinet, and that Hull's own memoirs concede no expectation of acceptance. Most American historians place the responsibility for war with Japan's decision, approved in Imperial Conference on November 5 and December 1, 1941, while acknowledging that Hull abandoned a modus vivendi that might have bought time.

Roosevelt's verdict, delivered on Hull's departure, and the Nobel Committee's a year later, have shaped the conventional estimate: a man of limited imagination and enormous persistence whose two constructions — an open trading system and a general international organization — outlasted both the New Deal and the war.

== See also ==
- Cordell Hull
- List of United States secretaries of state
- Good Neighbor policy
- Reciprocal Trade Agreements Act
- Hull note
- Events leading to the attack on Pearl Harbor
- Moscow Declarations
- Dumbarton Oaks Conference
- History of the United Nations
- Diplomatic history of World War II
- Franklin D. Roosevelt's foreign policy
