= Fillmore Township =

Fillmore Township may refer to:

- Fillmore Township, Montgomery County, Illinois
- Fillmore Township, Iowa County, Iowa
- Fillmore Township, Michigan
- Fillmore Township, Fillmore County, Minnesota
- Fillmore Township, Divide County, North Dakota, in Divide County, North Dakota
