= Hull note =

US ultimatum to Japan leading into WWII

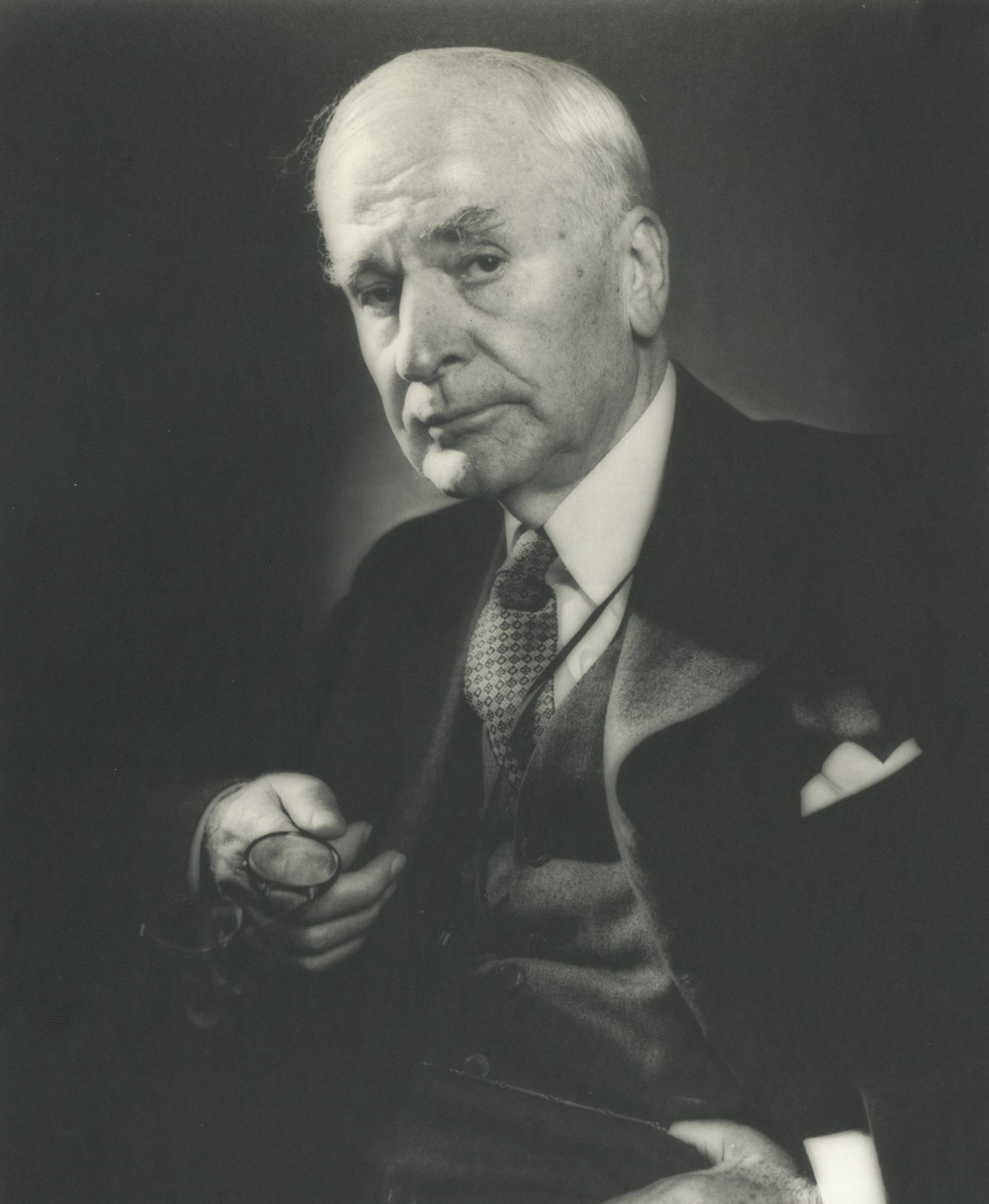
US Secretary of State Cordell Hull

The Hull note, officially the Outline of Proposed Basis for Agreement Between the United States and Japan, was the final proposal delivered to the Empire of Japan by the United States before the attack on Pearl Harbor and the Japanese declaration of war. The note, delivered on November 26, 1941, is named for Secretary of State Cordell Hull (in office: 1933–1944). It was the diplomatic culmination of a series of events leading to the attack on Pearl Harbor. Notably, its text repeats previous American demands for Japan to withdraw from China and from French Indochina. No further American proposals were made before the attack on Pearl Harbor, as the US government had received intelligence that Japan was preparing an invasion of Thailand.

== Background ==
The United States objected to the Second Sino-Japanese War of 1937 onwards and to the occupation of the Manchuria area of China by Japanese troops and settlers (1931 onwards). In protest, the United States sent support to the Nationalist Chinese government of Chiang Kai-shek, starting with the Lend-Lease Act (enacted in March 1941). In July 1941, Japanese military units occupied southern French Indochina, violating a gentlemen's agreement. Japanese bombers quickly moved into bases in Saigon and Cambodia, from which they could attack British Malaya. As a result, the US government, using the Export Control Act of 1940, joined Britain, China and the Netherlands in imposing trade sanctions on Japan, including the freezing of Japanese assets in the United States; this effectively created an embargo on oil exports from the U.S. to Japan, as Tokyo did not have the necessary currency with which to buy American oil.

Dean Acheson, a senior US State Department official, was the key decision-maker in this U.S. policy. He shifted American policy away from export restrictions and toward "full-blooded financial warfare against Japan". Edward S. Miller in Bankrupting the Enemy: The U.S. Financial Siege of Japan before Pearl Harbor characterises this financial freeze as "the most devastating American action against Japan".

== Final attempts at peace ==
On November 5, 1941, Emperor Hirohito approved, in Imperial Conference, the plan for the attack on Pearl Harbor. At the same time, his government made a last effort to arrive at a diplomatic solution of their differences with the United States. Ambassador Kichisaburō Nomura presented two proposals to the American government.

The first, Proposal A, was presented by him on November 6, 1941. It proposed making a final settlement of the Sino-Japanese War with a partial withdrawal of Japanese troops. United States military intelligence had deciphered some of Japan's diplomatic codes so they knew that there was a second proposal in case it failed. The United States government stalled and then rejected it on November 14, 1941.

On November 20, 1941, Nomura presented Proposal B, which offered to withdraw Japanese forces from southern Indochina if the United States agreed to end aid to the Nationalist Chinese, freeze military deployments in Southeast Asia (except for Japan's reinforcement of northern Indochina), provide Japan with "a required quantity of oil", and assist Japan in acquiring materials from the Dutch East Indies. The United States was about to make a counteroffer to this plan, which included a monthly supply of fuel for civilian use. However, President Franklin D. Roosevelt received a leak of Japan's war plan and news that Japanese troopships were on their way to Indochina. He then decided that the Japanese were not being sincere in their negotiations and instructed Secretary Hull to drop the counterproposal.

By November 26, top American officials at the White House, State, Navy, and War Departments believed that Japan was moving invasion forces toward Thailand. They also believed that the Japanese foreign ministry had put an absolute deadline on negotiations of November 29 because "after that things are automatically going to happen". The Americans were convinced that war would start in a matter of days, probably with a surprise Japanese attack.

The previous plan, to present Japan with a temporary modus vivendi, was strongly opposed by China and Britain and dropped.

== Content ==
The Hull Note consists of two sections. The first section is a "Draft mutual declaration of policy" by stating these principles:

1. inviolability of territorial integrity and sovereignty of each and all nations.
2. non-interference in the internal affairs of other countries.
3. equality, including equality of commercial opportunity and treatment.
4. reliance upon international cooperation and conciliation for the prevention and pacific settlement of controversies
5. non-discrimination in international commercial relations.
6. international economic cooperation and abolition of extreme nationalism as expressed in excessive trade restrictions.
7. non-discriminatory access by all nations to raw material supplies.
8. full protection of the interests of consuming countries and populations as regards the operation of international commodity agreements.
9. establishment of such institutions and arrangements of international finances

The second section consists of 10 points and is titled "Steps to be taken by the Government of the United States and by the Government of Japan"

1. multilateral non-aggression pact among the British Empire, China, Japan, the Netherlands, the Soviet Union, Thailand and the United States
2. pledge itself to respect the territorial integrity of French Indochina
3. withdraw of all military, naval, air and police forces from China and from Indo-China
4. no support (militarily, politically, economically) of any Government or regime in China other than the national Government of the Republic of China
5. Both Governments to give up all extraterritorial rights in China
6. enter into negotiations for the conclusion between the United States and Japan of a trade agreement, based upon reciprocal most favored-nation treatment
7. remove the freezing restrictions on Japanese funds in the United States and on American funds in Japan
8. agree upon a plan for the stabilization of the dollar-yen rate
9. no agreement with any third powers to conflict with the fundamental purpose of this agreement
10. influence other Governments to adhere to the basic political and economic principles in this agreement

== Delivery to and reception by the Japanese government ==
On November 26, 1941, Hull presented the Japanese ambassador with the Hull note, which, as one of its conditions, demanded the complete withdrawal of all Japanese troops from French Indochina and China. Japanese Prime Minister Tojo Hideki said to his cabinet that "this is an ultimatum", although the note was marked as "tentative" and contained no deadline.

== Final decision made to attack ==
The strike force that attacked Pearl Harbor had set sail the day before, on the morning of November 26, 1941, Japan time, which was November 25, Washington time. It could have been recalled along the way, but no further diplomatic progress was made.

At an Imperial Conference on December 1, Emperor Hirohito approved attacks against the United States, the United Kingdom, and the Netherlands. On December 4, President Roosevelt was warned by a 26-page ONI memo that the Japanese were showing particular interest in the (US) West Coast, the Panama Canal and the Territory of Hawaii. On December 7–8, the Japanese began attacks against the Philippines, Guam, Wake Island, Malaya, Singapore, Hong Kong, and Hawaii.

== See also ==
- Japanese declaration of war on the United States and the British Empire
- McCollum memo
- War Plan Orange
