= Prelude to the attack on Pearl Harbor =

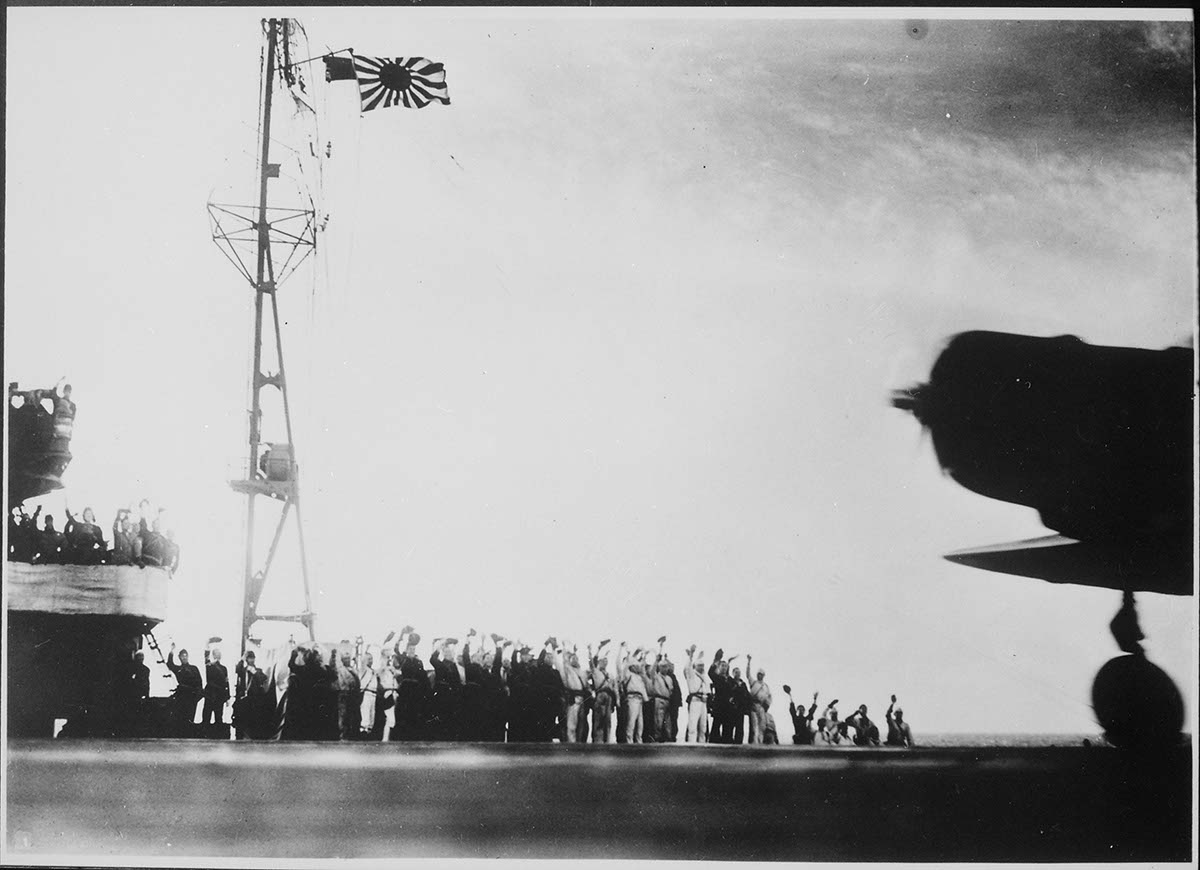
Captured Japanese photograph taken aboard a Japanese carrier before the attack on Pearl Harbor, December 7, 1941 (U.S. National Archives, 80-G-30549, 520599)

Before the attack on Pearl Harbor, war between the Empire of Japan and the United States was a possibility each nation's military forces had planned for after World War I. The expansion of American territories in the Pacific had been a threat to Japan since the 1890s, but real tensions did not begin until the Japanese invasion of Manchuria in 1931.

Japan's fear of being colonized and the government's expansionist policies led to its own imperialism in Asia and the Pacific, as it sought to join the great powers, all of which were Western nations. The Japanese government saw it necessary to become a colonial power in order to be modern and therefore Western.

In the 1930s, Japan expanded slowly into China, which led to the Second Sino-Japanese War in 1937. In 1940, Japan invaded French Indochina in an effort to embargo all imports into China, including war supplies that were purchased from the U.S. That move prompted the U.S. to embargo all oil exports, which led the Imperial Japanese Navy (IJN) to estimate it had less than two years of bunker oil remaining and to support the existing plans to seize oil resources in the Dutch East Indies.

Planning had been underway for some time on an attack on the "Southern Resource Area" to add it to the Greater East Asia Co-Prosperity Sphere Japan envisioned in the Pacific.

The Philippines, then an American protectorate, was also a Japanese target. The Japanese military concluded that an invasion of the Philippines would provoke an American military response. Rather than seize and fortify the islands and wait for the inevitable US counterattack, Japan's military leaders instead decided on the preventive attack on Pearl Harbor, which they assumed would negate the American forces needed for the liberation and the reconquest of the islands. (Later that day [December 8, local time], the Japanese indeed launched their invasion of the Philippines.)

Planning for the attack on Pearl Harbor had begun very early in 1941 by Admiral Isoroku Yamamoto. He finally won assent from the Naval High Command by, among other things, threatening to resign. The attack was approved in the summer at an Imperial Conference and again at a second Conference in the autumn. Simultaneously over the year, pilots were trained, and ships prepared for its execution. Authority for the attack was granted at the second Imperial Conference if a diplomatic result satisfactory to Japan was not reached. After the Hull note and the final approval by Emperor Hirohito, the order to attack was issued in early December.

== Background ==
In the 1890s, both the American acquisition of Pacific colonies near Japan in the Spanish-American War and its brokering of a resolution to the Russo-Japanese War via the Treaty of Portsmouth that was unsatisfactory for Japan created a public perception in Japan that the United States was inappropriately foisting itself into Asian regional politics and intent on limiting Japan.

Tensions between Japan and the prominent Western countries (the United States, France, the United Kingdom, and the Netherlands) increased significantly during the increasingly militaristic early reign of Emperor Hirohito. Japanese nationalists and military leaders increasingly influenced government policy and promoted a Greater East Asia Co-Prosperity Sphere as part of Japan's alleged "divine right" to unify Asia under Emperor Hirohito's rule. (Note: The effort to establish the Imperial Way (kōdō) had begun with the Second Sino-Japanese War (called seisen, or "holy war", by Japan).)

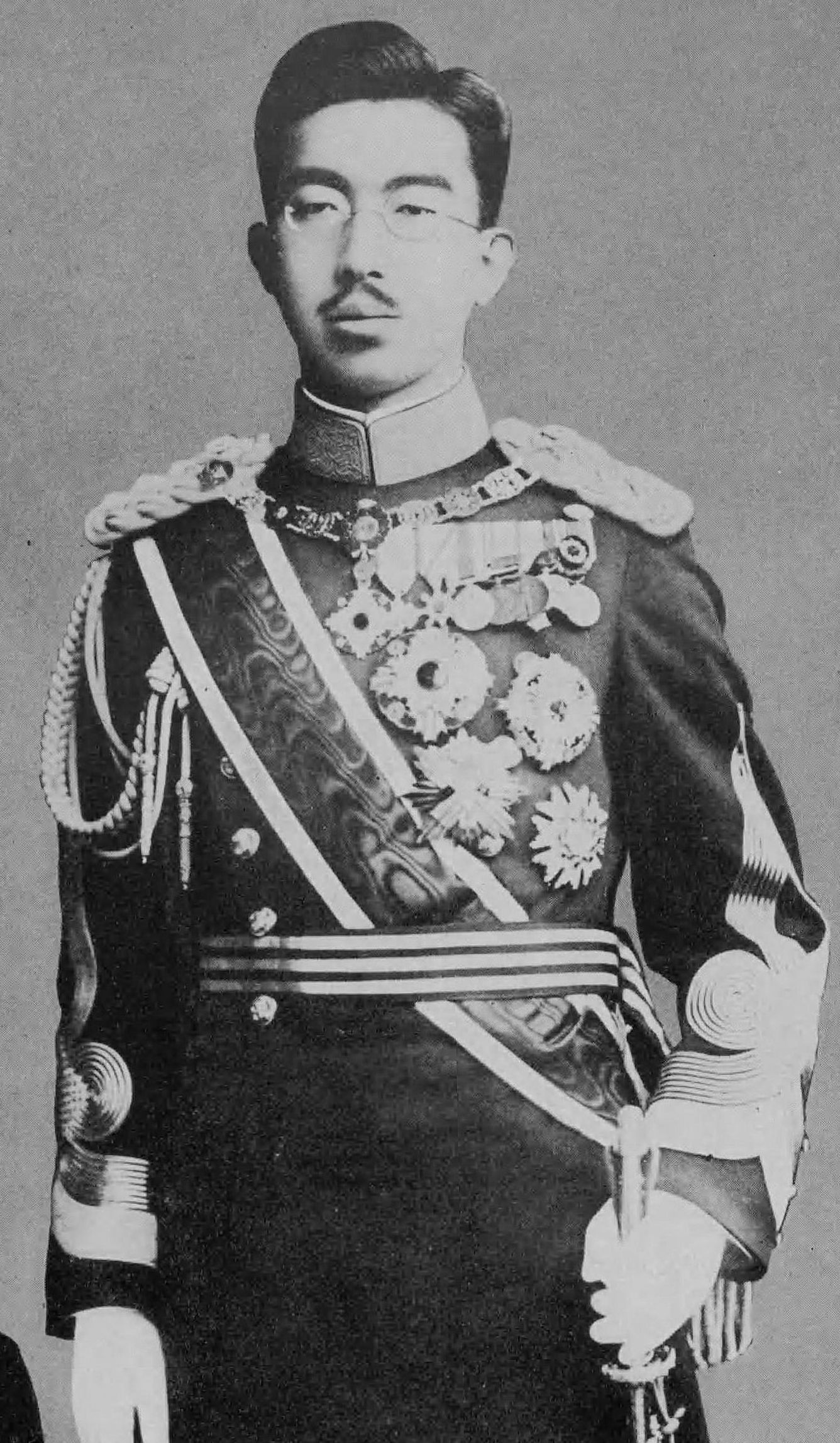
Emperor Hirohito, reigned from 1926 to 1989

In the 1930s, Japan's increasingly expansionist policies brought it into renewed conflict with its neighbors, the Soviet Union and China. The latter was in 1922 disappointed by Germany's former Chinese colony of Shandong being transferred to Japan in the Treaty of Versailles. (Japan had fought the First Sino-Japanese War with China in 1894–1895 and the Russo-Japanese War with Russia in 1904–1905. Japan's imperialist ambitions had a hand in precipitating both conflicts after which Japan gained a large sphere of influence in Manchuria and saw an opportunity to expand its position in China.) In March 1933 Japan withdrew from the League of Nations in response to international condemnation of its conquest of Manchuria and subsequent establishment of the Manchukuo puppet government there. On January 15, 1936, the Japanese withdrew from the Second London Naval Disarmament Conference because the United States and the United Kingdom refused to grant the Japanese Navy parity with theirs. A second war between Japan and China began with the Marco Polo Bridge Incident in July 1937.

Japan's 1937 attack on China was condemned by the U.S. and by several members of the League of Nations, including the United Kingdom, France, Australia, and the Netherlands. Japanese atrocities during the conflict, such as the notorious Nanjing Massacre that December, further complicated relations with the rest of the world. The U.S., (Note: Possessing the Philippines, Guam, and Wake Island) the United Kingdom, (Note: With Hong Kong, Burma, Singapore, and the territory of the future Malaysia) France (Note: With French Indochina (in World War II), including Vietnam, Cambodia and Laos) and the Netherlands (Note: With Indonesia, the former Dutch East Indies) all possessed colonies in East and Southeast Asia. Japan's new military power and willingness to use it threatened the Western economic and territorial interests in Asia.

In 1938, the U.S. began to adopt a succession of increasingly-restrictive trade restrictions with Japan, including terminating its 1911 commercial treaty with Japan in 1939, which was further tightened by the Export Control Act of 1940. Those efforts failed to deter Japan from continuing its war in China or from signing the Tripartite Pact in 1940 with Nazi Germany and Fascist Italy, which officially formed the Axis powers.

Japan would take advantage of Adolf Hitler's war in Europe to advance its own ambitions in the Far East. The Tripartite Pact guaranteed assistance if a signatory was attacked by any country not already involved in conflict with the signatory, which implicitly meant the U.S. and the Soviet Union. By joining the pact, Japan gained geopolitical power and sent the unmistakable message that any U.S. military intervention risked war on both shores: with Germany and Italy in the Atlantic and with Japan in the Pacific. The Franklin D. Roosevelt administration would not be dissuaded. Believing that the American way of life would be endangered if Europe and the Far East fell under fascist military dictatorship, it committed to help the British and the Chinese through loans of money and materiel and pledged sufficient continuing aid to ensure their survival. Thus, the United States slowly moved from being a neutral power to one preparing for war.

In mid-1940, President Roosevelt moved the U.S. Pacific Fleet to Pearl Harbor, Hawaii, to deter Japan. On October 8, 1940, Admiral James O. Richardson, Commander in Chief, Pacific Fleet, provoked a confrontation with Roosevelt by repeating his earlier arguments to Chief of Naval Operations Admiral Harold R. Stark and Secretary of the Navy Frank Knox that Pearl Harbor was the wrong place for his ships. Roosevelt believed relocating the fleet to Hawaii would exert a "restraining influence" on Japan.

Richardson asked Roosevelt if the United States was going to war and got this response:

At least as early as October 8, 1940,... affairs had reached such a state that the United States would become involved in a war with Japan.... 'that if the Japanese attacked Thailand, or the Kra Peninsula, or the Dutch East Indies we would not enter the war, that if they even attacked the Philippines he doubted whether we would enter the war, but that they (the Japanese) could not always avoid making mistakes and that as the war continued and that area of operations expanded sooner or later they would make a mistake and we would enter the war.'

Japan's September 1940 move into Vichy France-controlled French Indochina further raised tensions. Along with Japan's war with China, withdrawal from the League of Nations, alliance with Germany and Italy, and increasing militarization, the move induced the United States to intensify its measures to restrain Japan economically. The United States placed an embargo on scrap-metal shipments to Japan and closed the Panama Canal to Japanese shipping. That hit Japan's economy particularly hard because 74.1% of Japan's scrap iron came from the United States in 1938, and 93% of Japan's copper in 1939 came from the United States. In early 1941 Japan moved into southern Indochina, thereby threatening British Malaya, North Borneo and Brunei.

Japan and the U.S. engaged in negotiations in 1941 in an effort to improve relations. During the negotiations, Japan considered withdrawal from most of China and Indochina after it had drawn up peace terms with the Chinese. Japan would also adopt an independent interpretation of the Tripartite Pact and would not discriminate in trade if all other countries reciprocated. However, War Minister General Hideki Tojo rejected compromises in China. Responding to Japanese occupation of key airfields in Indochina (July 24) after an agreement between Japan and Vichy France, the U.S. froze Japanese assets on July 26, 1941, and on August 1, it established an embargo on oil and gasoline exports to Japan. The oil embargo was an especially strong response because oil was Japan's most crucial import, and more than 80% of Japan's oil came from the United States.

Japanese war planners had long looked south, especially to Brunei for oil and Malaya for rubber and tin. In the autumn of 1940, Japan requested 3.15 million barrels of oil from the Dutch East Indies but received a counteroffer of only 1.35 million. The complete U.S. oil embargo reduced the Japanese options to two: seize Southeast Asia before its existing stocks of strategic materials were depleted or submission to American demands. Moreover, any southern operation would be vulnerable to attack from the Philippines, a U.S. colony, and so war against the U.S. seemed necessary in any case.

After the embargoes and the asset freezes, the Japanese ambassador to the United States, Kichisaburō Nomura, and U.S. Secretary of State Cordell Hull held multiple meetings to resolve Japanese-American relations. No solution could be agreed upon for three key reasons:

1. Japan honored its alliance to Germany and Italy in the Tripartite Pact.
2. Japan wanted economic control and responsibility for Southeast Asia, as envisioned in the Greater East Asia Co-Prosperity Sphere.
3. Japan refused to leave Mainland China unless it kept its puppet state of Manchukuo.

In its final proposal on November 20, Japan offered to withdraw its forces from southern Indochina and not to launch any attacks in Southeast Asia if the U.S., Britain, and the Netherlands ceased aiding China and lifted their sanctions against Japan. The American counterproposal of November 26, the Hull note, required Japan to evacuate all of China unconditionally and to conclude non-aggression pacts with Pacific powers.

== Breaking off negotiations ==
Part of the Japanese plan for the attack included breaking off negotiations with the United States 30 minutes before the attack began. Diplomats from the Japanese embassy in Washington, D.C., including the Japanese ambassador, Admiral Kichisaburō Nomura and Special Representative Saburō Kurusu, had been conducting extended talks with the U.S. State Department regarding reactions to the Japanese move into French Indochina in the summer.

In the days before the attack, a long 14-part message was sent to the embassy from the Foreign Office in Tokyo that was encrypted with the Type 97 cypher machine, in a cipher named PURPLE by U.S. cryptanalysts, who were able to decode it. A short separate message gave instructions to deliver the 14-part message to Secretary of State Cordell Hull at 1:00 pm Washington time on December 7, 1941. The last part arrived late Saturday night (Washington Time), along with the 1 p.m. delivery message. But because of decryption and typing delays, due to the Japanese embassy refusing to hire local typists to maintain secrecy, and the embassy staff, unfamiliar with English, taking much longer to write the message, as well as Tokyo's failure to give early enough warning of the crucial necessity of the timing, the message wasn't delivered to Hull until over an hour after the attack started.

The United States had decrypted the 14th part well before the Japanese did so, and long before, embassy staff had composed a clean typed copy. The short message, with its instruction for the time of delivery, had been decoded Saturday night but was not acted upon until the next morning, according to Henry Clausen.

Nomura asked for an appointment to see Hull at 1:00 pm but later asked it be postponed to 1:45 as Nomura was not quite ready. Nomura and Kurusu arrived at 2:05 pm and were received by Hull at 2:20. Nomura apologized for the delay in presenting the message. After Hull had read several pages, he asked Nomura whether the document was presented under instructions of the Japanese government. Nomura replied that it was. After reading the full document, Hull turned to the ambassador and said:

I must say that in all my conversations with you... during the last nine months I have never uttered one word of untruth. This is borne out absolutely by the record. In all my fifty years of public service I have never seen a document that was more crowded with infamous falsehoods and distortions—infamous falsehoods and distortions on a scale so huge that I never imagined until today that any Government on this planet was capable of uttering them.

Japanese records, which were admitted into evidence during congressional hearings on the attack after the war, established that Japan had not even written a declaration of war until it had news of the successful attack. The two-line declaration was finally delivered to U.S. Ambassador Joseph Grew in Tokyo about ten hours after the completion of the attack. Grew was allowed to transmit it to the United States, where it was received late Monday afternoon (Washington time).

Once word got out throughout the fleet that the attack had commenced before war was officially declared, even some of the pilots and aircrew involved expressed outrage and dismay, considering such an action without a formal declaration of war dishonorable.

=== War ===
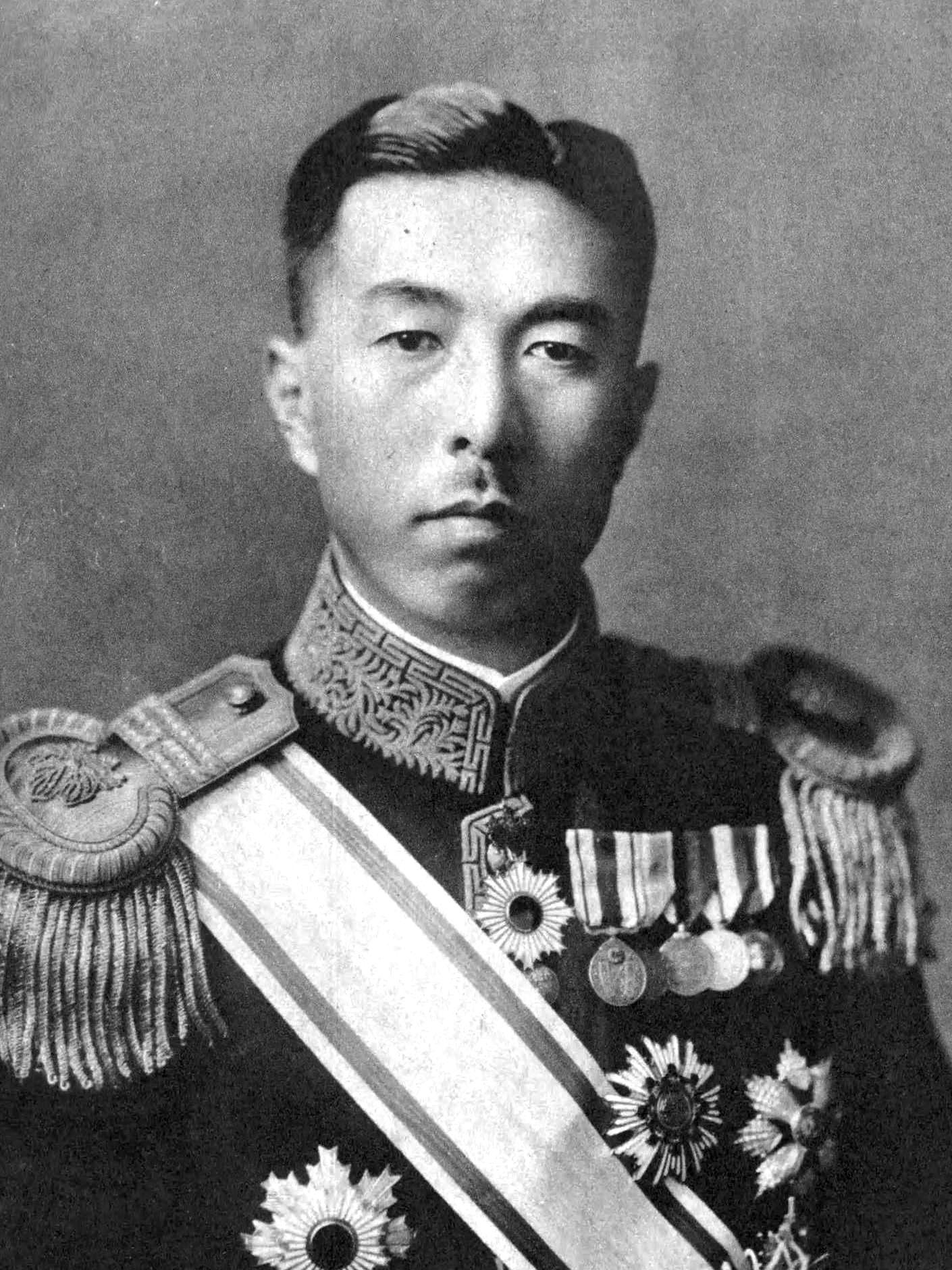
Prime Minister of Japan (1937–1939, 1940–1941) Konoe Fumimaro

In July 1941, IJN headquarters informed Emperor Hirohito its reserve bunker oil would be exhausted within two years if a new source was not found. In August 1941, Japanese Prime Minister Fumimaro Konoe proposed a summit with Roosevelt to discuss differences. Roosevelt replied that Japan must leave China before a summit meeting could be held. On September 6, 1941, at the second Imperial Conference concerning attacks on the Western colonies in Asia and Hawaii, Japanese leaders met to consider the attack plans prepared by Imperial General Headquarters. The summit occurred one day after the emperor had reprimanded General Hajime Sugiyama, chief of the IJA General Staff, about the lack of success in China and the speculated low chances of victory against the United States, the British Empire, and their allies.

Konoe argued for more negotiations and for possible concessions to avert war. However, military leaders such as Sugiyama, Minister of War General Hideki Tōjō, and chief of the IJN General Staff Fleet Admiral Osami Nagano asserted that time had run out and that additional negotiations would be pointless. They urged swift military actions against all American and European colonies in Southeast Asia and Hawaii. Tōjō argued that yielding to the American demand to withdraw troops would wipe out all the gains of the Second Sino-Japanese War, depress Army morale, endanger Manchukuo and jeopardize the control of Korea. Hence, doing nothing was the same as defeat and a loss of face.

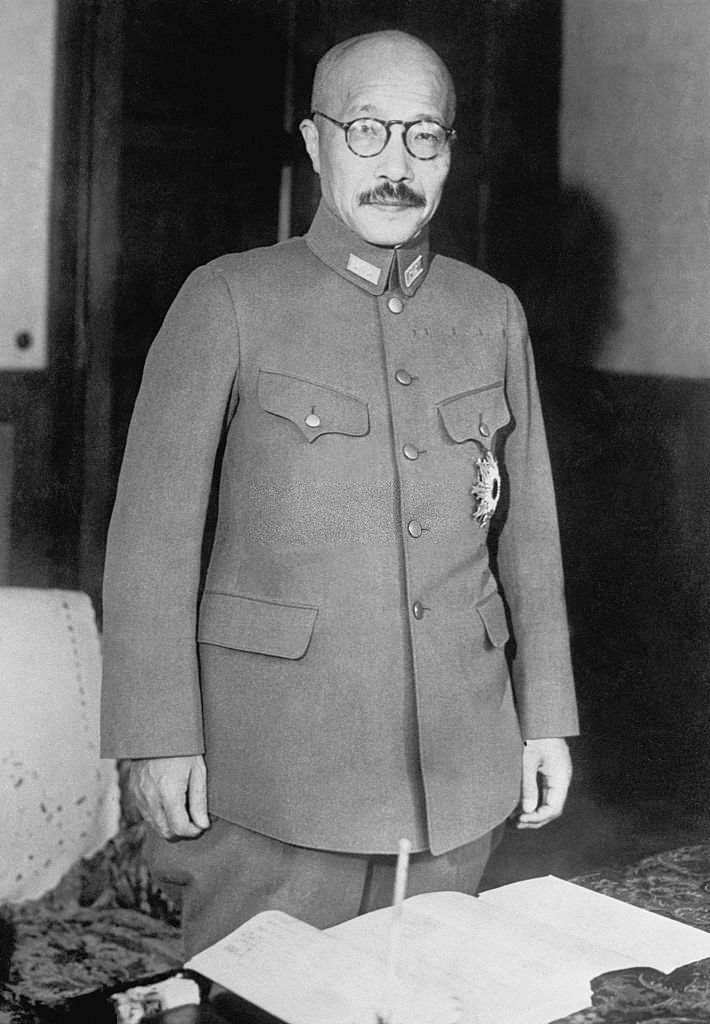
Prime Minister of Japan (1941–1944) Hideki Tojo

On October 16, 1941, Konoe resigned and proposed Prince Naruhiko Higashikuni, who was also the choice of the army and navy, as his successor. Hirohito appointed Hideki Tojo instead and was worried, as he told Konoe, about having the Imperial House being held responsible for a war against Western powers on Kōichi Kido's advice. Prince Naruhiko Higashikuni became prime minister on 17 August 1945, after the surrender of Japan.

On November 3, 1941, Nagano presented a complete plan for the attack on Pearl Harbor to Hirohito. At the Imperial Conference on November 5, Hirohito approved the plan for a war against the United States, Britain and the Netherlands that was scheduled to start in early December if an acceptable diplomatic settlement were not achieved before then. Over the following weeks, Tōjō's military regime offered a final deal to the United States. It offered to leave only Indochina in return for large American economic aid. On November 26, the so-called Hull Memorandum (or Hull Note) rejected the offer and stated that in addition to leaving Indochina, the Japanese must leave China and agree to an Open Door Policy in the Far East.

On 30 November 1941, Nobuhito, Prince Takamatsu warned his eldest brother, Hirohito, that the navy felt that Japan could not fight more than two years against the United States and wished to avoid war. After consulting with Kōichi Kido, who advised him to take his time until he was convinced, and Tōjō, Hirohito called Shigetarō Shimada and Nagano, who reassured him that war would be successful. On December 1, Hirohito finally approved a "war against United States, Great Britain and Holland" during another Imperial Conference, to commence with a surprise attack on the U.S. Pacific Fleet at its main forward base at Pearl Harbor, Hawaii.

=== Intelligence gathering ===
On February 3, 1940, Yamamoto briefed Captain Kanji Ogawa of Naval Intelligence on the potential attack plan and asked him to start intelligence gathering on Pearl Harbor. Ogawa already had spies in Hawaii, including Japanese Consular officials with an intelligence remit, and he arranged for help from a German already living in Hawaii who was an Abwehr agent. None had been providing much militarily useful information. He planned to add the 29-year-old Ensign Takeo Yoshikawa. By the spring of 1941, Yamamoto officially requested additional Hawaiian intelligence, and Yoshikawa boarded the liner Nitta-maru at Yokohama. He had grown his hair longer than military length and assumed the cover name Tadashi Morimura.

Yoshikawa began gathering intelligence in earnest by taking auto trips around the main islands, touring Oahu in a small plane, and posing as a tourist. He visited Pearl Harbor frequently and sketched the harbor and location of ships from the crest of a hill. Once, he gained access to Hickam Field in a taxi and memorized the number of visible planes, pilots, hangars, barracks and soldiers. He also discovered that Sunday was the day of the week on which the largest number of ships were likely to be in harbor, that PBY patrol went out every morning and evening, and there was an antisubmarine net in the mouth of the harbor. Information was returned to Japan in coded form in Consular communications and by direct delivery to intelligence officers aboard Japanese ships calling at Hawaii by consulate staff.

In June 1941, German and Italian consulates were closed, and there were suggestions that those of Japan should be closed, as well. They were not because they continued to provide valuable information (via MAGIC), and neither Roosevelt nor Hull wanted trouble in the Pacific. Had they been closed, however, it is possible Naval General Staff, which had opposed the attack from the outset, would have called it off since up-to-date information on the location of the Pacific Fleet, on which Yamamoto's plan depended, would no longer have been available.

=== Planning ===
Expecting war and seeing an opportunity in the forward basing of the U.S. Pacific Fleet in Hawaii, the Japanese began planning in early 1941 for an attack on Pearl Harbor. For the next several months, planning and organizing a simultaneous attack on Pearl Harbor and invasion of British and Dutch colonies to the south occupied much of the Japanese Navy's time and attention. The plans for the Pearl Harbor attack arose out of the Japanese expectation the U.S. would be inevitably drawn into war after a Japanese attack against Malaya and Singapore.

The intent of a preventive strike on Pearl Harbor was to neutralize American naval power in the Pacific and to remove it from influencing operations against American, British, and Dutch colonies. Successful attacks on colonies were judged to depend on successfully dealing with the Pacific Fleet. Planning (Note: Both U.S. and Japanese, as it turns out.) had long anticipated a battle in Japanese home waters after the U.S. fleet traveled across the Pacific while it was under attack by submarines and other forces all the way. The U.S. fleet would be defeated in a "decisive battle", as Russia's Baltic Fleet had been in 1905. A surprise attack posed a twofold difficulty compared to longstanding expectations. First, the Pacific Fleet was a formidable force and would not be easy to defeat or to surprise. Second, Pearl Harbor's shallow waters made using conventional aerial torpedoes ineffective. On the other hand, Hawaii's distance meant a successful surprise attack could not be blocked or quickly countered by forces from the Continental U.S.

Several Japanese naval officers had been impressed by the British action at the Battle of Taranto in which 21 obsolete Fairey Swordfish disabled half of the Regia Marina's battleships (three out of six). Admiral Yamamoto even dispatched a delegation to Italy, which concluded a larger and better-supported version of Cunningham's strike could force the U.S. Pacific Fleet to retreat to bases in California, which would give Japan the time needed to establish a "barrier" defense to protect Japanese control of the Dutch East Indies. The delegation returned to Japan with information about the shallow-running torpedoes Cunningham's engineers had devised.

Japanese strategists were undoubtedly influenced by Admiral Heihachiro Togo's surprise attack on the Russian Pacific Fleet at the Battle of Port Arthur in 1904. Yamamoto's emphasis on destroying the American battleships was in keeping with the Mahanian doctrine shared by all major navies during this period, including the U.S. Navy and the Royal Navy.

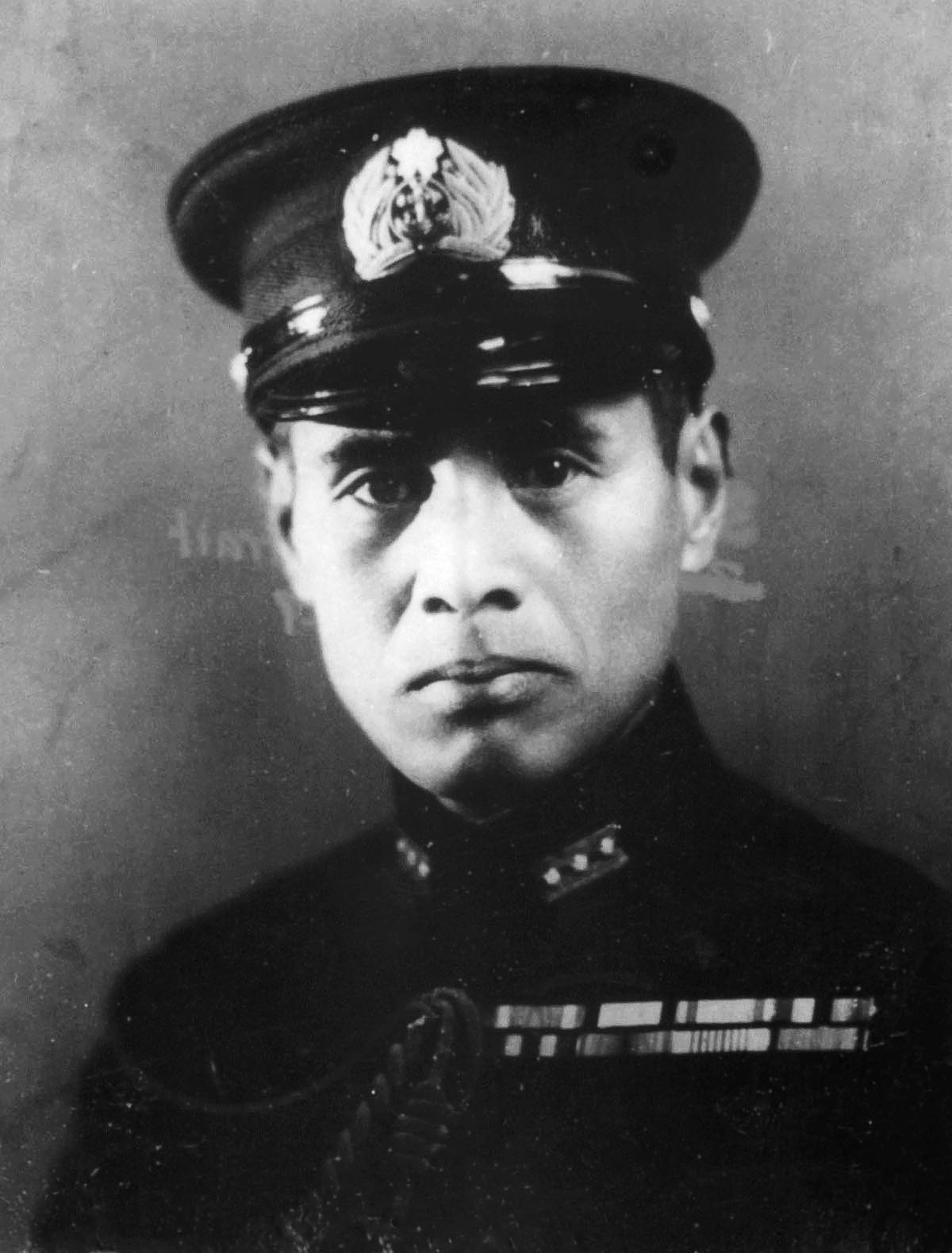
Planner Commander Minoru Genda stressed that surprise would be critical.

In a letter dated January 7, 1941, Yamamoto finally delivered a rough outline of his plan to Koshiro Oikawa, the Navy Minister, from whom he also requested to be made commander-in-chief of the air fleet to attack Pearl Harbor. A few weeks later, in yet another letter, Yamamoto requested for Admiral Takijiro Onishi, chief of staff of the Eleventh Air Fleet, to study the technical feasibility of an attack against the American base. Onishi gathered as many facts as possible about Pearl Harbor.

After first consulting with Kosei Maeda, an expert on aerial torpedo warfare, and being told that the harbor's shallow waters rendered such an attack almost impossible, Onishi summoned Commander Minoru Genda. After studying the original proposal put forth by Yamamoto, Genda agreed that "the plan is difficult but not impossible." Yamamoto gave the bulk of the planning to Rear Admiral Ryunosuke Kusaka, who was very worried about the area's air defenses. Yamamoto encouraged Kusaka by telling him, "Pearl Harbor is my idea and I need your support." Genda emphasized the attack should be carried out early in the morning and in total secrecy and use an aircraft carrier force and several types of bombing.

Although attacking the U.S. Pacific Fleet anchorage would achieve surprise, it also carried two distinct disadvantages. The targeted ships would be sunk or damaged in very shallow water and so they could quite likely be salvaged and possibly returned to duty (as six of the eight battleships eventually were). Also, most of the crews would survive the attack since many would be on shore leave or would be rescued from the harbor afterward. Despite those concerns, Yamamoto and Genda pressed ahead.

By April 1941, the Pearl Harbor plan became known as Operation Z, after the famous Z signal that was given by Admiral Tōgō at the Battle of Tsushima. Over the summer, pilots trained in earnest near Kagoshima City on Kyūshū. Genda chose it because its geography and infrastructure presented most of the same problems bombers would face at Pearl Harbor. In training, each crew flew over the 5,000 ft (1,500 m) mountain behind Kagoshima, dove into the city, dodged buildings and smokestacks, and dropped to 25 ft (7.6 m) at the piers. Bombardiers released torpedoes at a breakwater some 300 yd (270 m) away.

However, even that low-altitude approach would not overcome the problem of torpedoes from reaching the bottom in the shallow waters of Pearl Harbor. Japanese weapons engineers created and tested modifications to allow successful shallow water drops. The efforts resulted in a heavily modified version of the Type 91 torpedo, which was outfitted with wooden tail fins that let it operate at shallower depths and inflicted most of the ship damage during the eventual attack. Japanese weapons technicians also produced special armor-piercing bombs by fitting fins and release shackles to 14- and 16-inch (356- and 406-mm) naval shells. They could penetrate the lightly armored decks of the old battleships.

=== Concept of Japanese invasion of Hawaii ===
At several stages during 1941, Japan's military leaders discussed the possibility of launching an invasion to seize the Hawaiian Islands to provide Japan with a strategic base to shield its new empire, deny the United States any bases beyond the West Coast and further isolate Australia and New Zealand.

Genda, who saw Hawaii as vital for American operations against Japan after war began, believed that Japan must follow any attack on Pearl Harbor with an invasion of Hawaii or risk losing the war. He viewed Hawaii as a base to threaten the West Coast of North America and perhaps as a negotiating tool for ending the war. He believed that after a successful air attack, 10,000–15,000 men could capture Hawaii, and he saw the operation as a precursor or an alternative to a Japanese invasion of the Philippines. In September 1941, Commander Yasuji Watanabe of the Combined Fleet staff estimated two divisions (30,000 men) and 80 ships, in addition to the carrier strike force, could capture the islands. He identified two possible landing sites, near Haleiwa and Kaneohe Bay, and proposed for both to be used in an operation that would require up to four weeks with Japanese air superiority.

Although the idea gained some support, it was soon dismissed for several reasons:

- Japan's ground forces, logistics, and resources were already fully committed not only to the Second Sino-Japanese War but also for offensives in Southeast Asia, which were planned to occur almost simultaneously with the Pearl Harbor attack.
- The Imperial Japanese Army (IJA) insisted it needed to focus on operations in China and Southeast Asia and so refused to provide substantial support elsewhere. Because of a lack of co-operation between the services, the IJN never discussed the Hawaiian invasion proposal with the IJA. (Note: It was for those reasons IJA also rejected proposals for an invasion of Australia.)
- Most of the senior officers of the Combined Fleet, particularly Admiral Nagano, believed an invasion of Hawaii was too risky. (Note: For a more detailed analysis of whether a Japanese invasion of Hawaii could have been successful, see "Invasion: Pearl Harbor!". Combinedfleet.com.)

With an invasion ruled out, it was agreed that a massive carrier-based three-wave airstrike against Pearl Harbor to destroy the Pacific Fleet would be sufficient. Japanese planners knew that Hawaii, with its strategic location in the Central Pacific, would serve as a critical base from which the U.S. could extend its military power against Japan. However, the confidence of Japan's leaders that the conflict would be over quickly and that the U.S. would choose to negotiate a compromise, rather than fight a long bloody war, overrode that concern. (Note: In late April or early May of 1942, Yamamoto reportedly secured a tentative agreement that an invasion of Hawaii would be launched after military operations in the Western Pacific were completed and additional ground troops and warships were available. By mid-1942, Yamamoto had assembled sufficient forces for an invasion of the Midway Atoll, which was expected to serve as a base for further attacks against Hawaii. However, in the subsequent Battle of Midway, the loss of four of Japan's six largest aircraft carriers made any future air and naval operations, let alone an invasion, against Hawaii impossible.)

Watanabe's superior, Captain Kameto Kuroshima, who believed the invasion plan unrealistic, would later call his rejection of it the "biggest mistake" of his life.

== Strike force ==
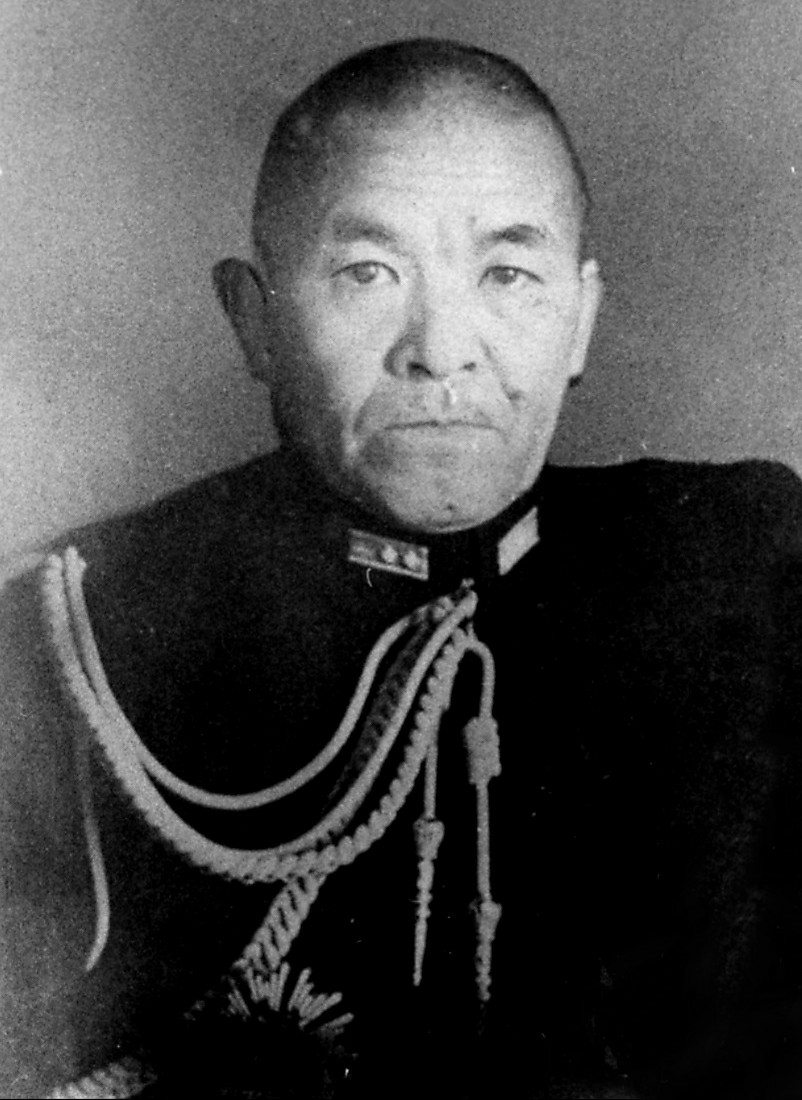
Admiral Chuichi Nagumo

On November 26, 1941, the day that the Hull Note, which the Japanese leaders saw as an unproductive and old proposal, was received, the carrier force, under the command of Vice Admiral Chuichi Nagumo and already assembled in Hitokappu Wan, sortied for Hawaii under strict radio silence.

In 1941, Japan was one of the few countries capable of carrier aviation. The Kido Butai, the Combined Fleet's main carrier force of six aircraft carriers (at the time, the most powerful carrier force with the greatest concentration of air power in the history of naval warfare), embarked 359 airplanes, (Note: The figure of 414 includes scout planes operated by escorts, which were not part of the strike force.) which were organized as the First Air Fleet. The carriers Akagi (flag), Kaga, Sōryū, Hiryū, and the newest, Shōkaku and Zuikaku, had 135 Mitsubishi A6M Type 0 fighters (Allied codename "Zeke," commonly called "Zero"), 171 Nakajima B5N Type 97 torpedo bombers (Allied codename "Kate"), and 108 Aichi D3A Type 99 dive bombers (Allied codename "Val") aboard. Two fast battleships, two heavy cruisers, one light cruiser, nine destroyers, and three fleet submarines provided escort and screening. In addition, the Advanced Expeditionary Force included 20 fleet and five two-man Ko-hyoteki-class midget submarines, which were to gather intelligence and sink U.S. vessels attempting to flee Pearl Harbor during or soon after the attack. It also had eight oilers for underway fueling.

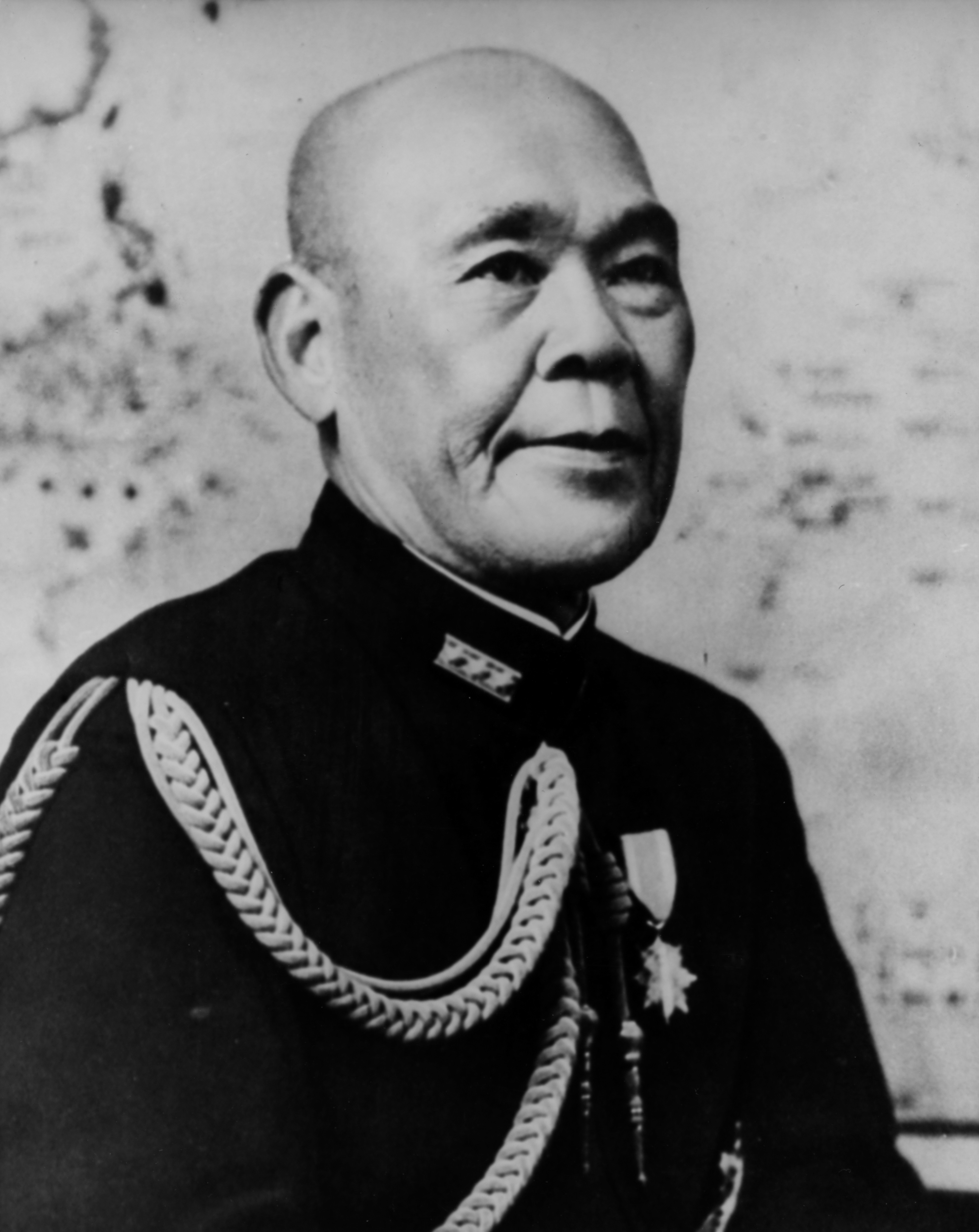
Fleet Admiral Osami Nagano

=== Execute order ===
On December 1, 1941, after the striking force was en route, Chief of Staff Nagano gave a verbal directive to the commander of the Combined Fleet, Admiral Isoroku Yamamoto, to inform him:

Japan has decided to open hostilities against the United States, United Kingdom, and the Netherlands early in December.... Should it appear certain that Japanese-American negotiations will reach an amicable settlement prior to the commencement of hostilities, it is understood that all elements of the Combined Fleet are to be assembled and returned to their bases in accordance with separate orders. [The Kido Butai will] proceed to the Hawaiian Area with utmost secrecy and, at the outbreak of the war, will launch a resolute surprise attack on and deal a fatal blow to the enemy fleet in the Hawaiian Area. The initial air attack is scheduled at 0330 hours, X Day.

Upon completion, the force was to return to Japan, re-equip, and redeploy for "Second Phase Operations."

Finally, Order Number 9, issued on 1 December 1941 by Nagano, told Yamamoto to crush hostile naval and air forces in Asia; the Pacific and Hawaii; seize the main U.S., British, and Dutch bases in East Asia promptly; and "capture and secure the key areas of the southern regions."

On the home leg, the force was ordered to be alert for tracking and counterattacks by the Americans and to return to the friendly base in the Marshall Islands, rather than the Home Islands.

== Lack of preparation ==
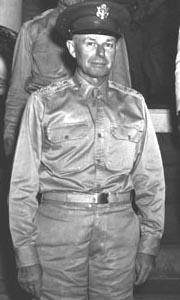
Lieutenant General Walter C. Short, the commanding general of the Army post at Pearl Harbor

In 1924, General William L. Mitchell produced a 324-page report warning that future wars, including with Japan, would include a new role for aircraft against existing ships and facilities. He even discussed the possibility of an air attack on Pearl Harbor, but his warnings were ignored. Navy Secretary Knox had also appreciated the possibility of an attack at Pearl Harbor in a written analysis shortly after he had taken office. American commanders had been warned that tests had demonstrated shallow-water aerial torpedo attacks were possible, but no one in charge in Hawaii fully appreciated that. In a 1932 fleet problem, a surprise airstrike led by Admiral Harry E. Yarnell had been judged a success and to have caused considerable damage, a finding that was corroborated in a 1938 exercise by Admiral Ernest King. In October 1941, Lord Mountbatten visited Pearl Harbor. While lecturing American naval officers on Royal Navy tactics against the Germans, an officer asked when and how the United States would enter the war. Mountbatten pointed to Pearl Harbor on a map of the Pacific and said "right here" by citing Japan's surprise attack on Port Arthur and the British attack on Taranto. In Washington, he warned Stark about how unprepared the base was against a bomber attack. Stark replied, "I'm afraid that putting some of your recommendations into effect is going to make your visit out there very expensive for the U.S. Navy."

By 1941, U.S. signals intelligence, through the Army's Signal Intelligence Service and the Office of Naval Intelligence's OP-20-G, had intercepted and decrypted considerable Japanese diplomatic and naval cipher traffic, but nothing actually carried significant information about Japanese military plans in 1940 or 1941. Decryption and distribution of this intelligence, including such decrypts as were available, was capricious and sporadic, some of which can be accounted for by lack of resources and manpower. At best, the information available to decision makers in Washington was fragmentary, contradictory, or poorly distributed and was almost entirely raw without supporting analysis. It was thus incompletely understood. Nothing in it pointed directly to an attack at Pearl Harbor, (Note: In August 1941, the Yugoslav-British agent Dušan Popov submitted a report to the FBI's J. Edgar Hoover that included a questionnaire about Pearl Harbor from the Japanese.) and a lack of awareness of Imperial Navy capabilities led to a widespread underlying belief that Pearl Harbor was not a possible attack target. Only one message from the Hawaiian Japanese consulate, sent on 6 December in a low-level consular cipher, included mention of an attack at Pearl Harbor, and it was not decrypted until 8 December. The Japanese diplomatic code (Purple code) could be read, but the current version (JN-25C) of the Japanese naval code (JN-25), which had replaced JN-25B on 4 December 1941, could not be read until May 1942.

U.S. civil and military intelligence had good information suggesting additional Japanese aggression throughout the summer and fall before the attack. At the time, however, no reports specifically indicated an attack against Pearl Harbor. Public press reports during summer and fall, including Hawaiian newspapers, contained extensive reports of the growing tension in the Pacific. Late in November, all Pacific commands, including both the Navy and Army in Hawaii, were separately and explicitly warned that war with Japan was expected in the very near future, and it was preferred for Japan make the first hostile act. It was felt that war would most probably start with attacks in the Far East in the Philippines, French Indochina, Thailand, or the Russian Far East. Pearl Harbor was never mentioned as a potential target. The warnings were not specific to any area and noted only that war with Japan was expected in the near future and that all commands should act accordingly. If any of the warnings had produced an active alert status in Hawaii, the attack might have been resisted more effectively and perhaps resulted in less death and damage. On the other hand, recall of men on shore leave to the ships in harbor might have led to still more being casualties from bombs and torpedoes or trapped in capsized ships by shut watertight doors, as the attack alert status would have required, (Note: Technically called "Condition Zed.") or killed in their obsolete aircraft by the more experienced Japanese aviators. When the attack actually arrived, Pearl Harbor was effectively unprepared since anti-aircraft weapons not manned, most ammunition locked down, anti-submarine measures not implemented (such as no torpedo nets being in the harbor), combat air patrol not flying, available scouting aircraft were not in the air at first light, Air Corps aircraft were parked wingtip to wingtip to reduce sabotage risks (they were not ready to fly at a moment's warning), and so on.

Nevertheless, it was believed Pearl Harbor had natural defenses against torpedo attack (such as by the shallow water) and so the Navy did not deploy torpedo nets or baffles, which were judged to inconvenience ordinary operations. As a result of the limited numbers of long-range aircraft (including Army Air Corps bombers), reconnaissance patrols were not being made as often or as far out as required for adequate coverage against possible surprise attack (they improved considerably, with far fewer remaining planes after the attack). The Navy had 33 PBYs in the islands, but only three were on patrol at the time of the attack. Hawaii was low on the priority list for the B-17s finally becoming available for the Pacific, largely because General Douglas MacArthur in the Philippines was successfully demanding for as many as could be made available to the Pacific, where they were intended as a deterrent. The British, who had contracted for them, even agreed to accept fewer of them to facilitate the buildup. At the time of the attack, Army and Navy were both on training status, rather than operational alert.

There was also confusion about the Army's readiness status as Short had changed local alert level designations without clearly informing Washington. Most of the Army's mobile anti-aircraft guns were secured, with ammunition locked down in armories. To avoid upsetting property owners and in keeping with Washington's admonition not to alarm civil populations (such as in the late November war warning messages from the Navy and War Departments), guns were not dispersed around Pearl Harbor (on private property). Additionally, aircraft were parked on airfields to lessen the risk of sabotage, not in anticipation of air attack, in keeping with Short's interpretation of the war warnings.

Chester Nimitz said later, "It was God's mercy that our fleet was in Pearl Harbor on December 7, 1941." Nimitz believed that if Kimmel had discovered the Japanese approach, he would have sortied to meet them. With the three American aircraft carriers (Enterprise, Lexington, and Saratoga) absent and Kimmel's battleships at a severe disadvantage to the Japanese carriers, the likely result would have been the sinking of the American battleships at sea in deep water, where they would have been lost forever with tremendous casualties (as many as 20,000 dead), instead of in Pearl Harbor, where the crews could easily be rescued, and six battleships ultimately were raised.

== Rainbow-5 ==
Rainbow-5 was the joint Army and Navy war plan outlining strategies and steps for the U.S. entry into the war. On 25 October, Rear Admiral R.K. Turner, Director, War Plans Division moved to add to Rainbow-5:

"The Navy is charged with the defense of the outlying island bases in the Hawaiian Area. Marine Corps ground troops have been sent to all islands where the Navy is constructing bases. The strength of these troops is [reasonably] adequate, except with respect to defensive aircraft. The Navy plans to provider fighter and short range bomber aircraft for these bases but the organization, squadrons, and supply of plans for them, is still a matter for future accomplishment. The only planes available to the Navy are those on aircraft carriers, or the small number in the 2nd Aircraft Wing of the 2nd Marine Division. Planes cannot be spared from the carriers. They should not be taken from the 2nd Aircraft Wing, because of the possible need of these squadrons for offensive operations for the capture of additional island position."

== See also ==
- Pearl Harbor advance-knowledge conspiracy theory
