= Phillimore (disambiguation) =

Phillimore is the surname of various people. It may also refer to:

- Baron Phillimore or the Phillimore Baronets, a title in the Peerage of the United Kingdom
- Phillimore Island, an island in the River Thames in southern England
- USS Phillimore (PF-89), a United States Navy patrol frigate transferred to the Royal Navy as HMS Perim (K593) from 1944 to 1945
- Phillimore & Co. Ltd., former publishing house of Shopwyke Hall, Chichester, founded by William Phillimore Watts Phillimore

== See also ==
- Fillmore (disambiguation)
