= Chapman, Illinois =

- Unincorporated community
- Location within Illinois Location within the United States
- Coordinates: 39°06′20″N 89°19′01″W
- Country: United States
- State: Illinois
- County: Montgomery
- Elevation: 640 ft (200 m)
- Time zone: UTC-6 (Central (CST))
  - Summer (DST): UTC-5 (CDT)
- Area code: 217
- GNIS feature ID: 405968

Chapman is an unincorporated community in Fillmore Township, Montgomery County, Illinois, United States. Chapman is located on County Route 9, 2.2 miles (3.5 km) west-southwest of Fillmore.
