= South Fillmore Township, Montgomery County, Illinois =

South Fillmore Township
- Former township
- Location in Montgomery County
- Coordinates: 39°3′N 89°19′W
- Country: United States
- State: Illinois
- County: Montgomery
- Established: 1921

Area
  - Total: 24.12 sq mi (62.5 km^{2})
  - Land: 24.12 sq mi (62.5 km^{2})
  - Water: 0 sq mi (0 km^{2})
- Elevation: 617 ft (188 m)

Population (2010)
  - Total: 244
  - Density: 10.1/sq mi (3.91/km^{2})
- Time zone: UTC-6 (CST)
  - Summer (DST): UTC-5 (CDT)

South Fillmore Township was a civil township of Montgomery County, Illinois, United States, including the community of Van Burensburg. It consisted of the northern two-thirds of survey Township 7 North, Range 2 West of the Third Principal Meridian.

== History ==
Historical population
Census	Pop.	Note	%±
1930	402		—
1940	423		5.2%
1950	334		−21.0%
1960	282		−15.6%
1970	270		−4.3%
1980	286		5.9%
1990	238		−16.8%
2000	313		31.5%
2010	244		−22.0%
2017 (est.)	122		−50.0%
U.S. Decennial Census

It was split from Fillmore Township in 1921, and annexed back into Fillmore Township in May 2017.

As of the 2010 Census, its population was 244 and it contained 116 housing units in a total area of 24.12 square miles (62.5 km^{2}), all land.

In November 2016, voters passed a referendum to consolidate South Fillmore Township into Fillmore Township as of the May 2017 township elections.

== Adjacent townships ==
- Fillmore Township (north)
- Shafter Township, Fayette County (east)
- Mulberry Grove Township, Bond County (south)
- Lagrange Township, Bond County (southwest)
- East Fork Township (west & northwest)
