= ABCD Encirclement =

Series of embargoes against Japan beginning in 1940

The ABCD encirclement (Japanese: ABCD包囲網, romanized: Ēbīshīdī hōimō) was a series of embargoes against the Empire of Japan by foreign nations, including the Americans, the British, the Chinese, and the Dutch. In 1940, in an effort to discourage Japanese militarism, these nations and others stopped selling iron ore, steel, and oil to Japan, denying it the raw materials needed to continue its activities in China and French Indochina. In Japan, the government and nationalists viewed these embargoes as acts of aggression; imported oil made up about 80% of domestic consumption, without which Japan's economy, let alone its military, would grind to a halt. The Japanese media, influenced by military propagandists, began to refer to the embargoes as the "ABCD ("American-British-Chinese-Dutch") encirclement" or "ABCD line".

Faced with the possibility of economic collapse and forced withdrawal from its recent conquests, the Japanese Imperial General Headquarters began planning for a war with the Western powers in April 1941. This culminated in the Japanese invasion of Malaya and Thailand, and the bombing of Pearl Harbor in December 1941.

== Name ==
The name ABCD Line is of Japanese origin, having been disseminated by the Japanese government in propaganda and textbooks in the late 1930s. It is an example of Japanese propagandists portraying Japan as the protector of Asia, as in the name of the Japanese Empire's colonial holdings, the Greater East Asia Co-Prosperity Sphere. This wartime narrative portrayed Japan fighting against Western colonialists and Chinese communists primarily, overlooking the primacy of resource rich areas of Asia in Japan's annexing of lands. Japanese historian Saburō Ienaga writes that a key aspect of the Greater East Asian Co-Prosperity Sphere as propaganda was "liberating Asians from American and British imperialism".

== Political background ==
Japan in the early 1930s pursued an expansionist foreign policy, starting with the Manchurian Incident in 1931 and continuing with further military actions throughout the decade. In 1937, this broke out into full-scale war between Japan and China when the two nations' armies skirmished near the Marco Polo Bridge, eventually leading to a full scale Japanese Army invasion of China. These incidents, especially the Nanking Massacre, were heavily reported in the international media.

In the United States, reporting on the Japanese bombing of Chinese cities was particularly negative. This, combined with the general perception of Japanese threats to peace in Asia, contributed to 73% of general public in the United States opposing the export of military supplies to Japan in June 1939. This would result in the United States freezing Japanese assets on July 26, 1941 (alongside Britain and the Netherlands), effectively ending the export of raw materials and petroleum to Japan.

== Economic impact ==
Meetings between the military leadership of Australia, Britain, and the Netherlands in Singapore, in February 1941, only reinforced Japanese fears of an ABCD encirclement. Similar meetings took place between British leadership and Chinese forces actively fighting Japan, with the eventual goal being coordinated military aid.

=== Japan's response to embargo ===
Japan would go on to occupy islands in oil-producing areas of Southeast Asia after invading the Dutch East Indies, sending over 70% of Japanese petroleum workers to rehabilitate facilities destroyed by the retreating colonial powers. Through a combination of exploiting formerly Dutch oil deposits in and making synthetic fuel domestically, the Japanese oil production was able to peak, in the first quarter of 1943, at 80% of the oil that had been imported from the "ABCD" countries in 1940.

Japan was never able to fully match pre-embargo petroleum production figures while at war.

== See also ==
- Tripartite Pact
- Hull note
- Second Sino-Japanese War
- AUKUS
- Quadrilateral Security Dialogue
