= Phillimore =

Phillimore is a surname. Notable people with the surname include:

People:

- Augustus Phillimore (1822–1897), Royal Navy admiral
- Claud Phillimore, 4th Baron Phillimore (1911–1994), English architect
- Egerton Phillimore (1856–1937), British scholar of Welsh literature and language
- Greville Phillimore (1821–1884), British Anglican priest and hymnal compiler
- Henry Phillimore (1910–1974), English barrister and judge
- John Phillimore (1781–1840), Royal Navy captain
- John George Phillimore (1808–1865), English barrister, jurist and politician
- John Swinnerton Phillimore (1873–1926), British classical scholar, translator, and poet
- Joseph Phillimore (1775–1855), English civil lawyer, politician and Regius Professor of Civil Law at Oxford
- Reginald Henry Phillimore (1879–1964), British army engineer, surveyor and historian
- Richard Phillimore (1864–1940), Royal Navy admiral
- Robert Phillimore, 1st Baronet (1810–1885), English judge and politician
- Stephen Phillimore (1881–1956), Anglican Archdeacon of Middlesex
- Walter Phillimore, 1st Baron Phillimore (1845–1929), British lawyer and judge, Lord Justice of Appeal
- William Phillimore Watts Phillimore (1853–1913), lawyer, genealogist, and publisher, the founder of Phillimore & Co. Ltd

Fictional characters:

- James Phillimore, whose disappearance is mentioned as an unsolved Sherlock Holmes case

== See also ==
- Millard Fillmore (1800–1874), thirteenth President of the United States (1850 to 1853), last President of the Whig Party
