= Filmore =

Filmore may refer to:

== People ==
- John Filmore (1788–1839), British naval officer
- Tommy Filmore (1906–1954), Canadian ice hockey player

== Places ==
- Filmore, New Orleans, a neighborhood New Orleans, Louisiana, USA
- Filmore Township, Bollinger County, Missouri, USA

== See also ==
- Fillmore (disambiguation)
