= Van Burensburg, Illinois =

- Unincorporated community
- Location within Illinois Location within the United States
- Coordinates: 39°02′10″N 89°16′46″W
- Country: United States
- State: Illinois
- County: Montgomery
- Elevation: 597 ft (182 m)
- Time zone: UTC-6 (Central (CST))
  - Summer (DST): UTC-5 (CDT)
- Area code: 217
- GNIS feature ID: 420215

Van Burensburg is an unincorporated community in Fillmore Township, Montgomery County, Illinois, United States. Van Burensburg is located on Illinois Route 185, 11.3 miles (18.2 km) west-northwest of Vandalia.
