= Reginald Henry Phillimore =

Colonel Reginald Henry Phillimore (19 June 1879 – 30 October 1964) was a Surveyor General in India who wrote a five volume history of the Survey of India including a comprehensive history of the Great Trigonometrical Survey.

Phillimore was born in Ireland, the son of Admiral Henry Bourchier Phillimore and Anne Ellen Bourdillon. He became Queen's scholar of Westminster and joined the Woolwich Academy and joined the Royal Engineers in June 1898. He went to India in September 1900 and served with the Madras Sappers and Miners at Malakand and Swat. In June 1903, he joined the Survey of India and was involved in surveys in Burma and Assam. In 1914 he joined military duty and served in France and Salonica where he was involved in improving maps of the region, developing methods to determine distance for artillery targeting by sound-ranging and flash-spotting. He was promoted Brevet Lieutenant-Colonel and received a DSO. After the war he returned to become director of the Burma Circle of the survey of India. He then directed the eastern and northern Circles and from 1928 to 1930 he was director of the frontier Circle. He acted as Surveyor-General for a year and was in charge of map publication at Calcutta. He served finally at the Dehra Dun geodetic branch of the Survey of India before retiring in 1934. He then began to work on a history of surveying and map-making in India based on the archives held in Dehra Dun. He was a founding member of the Himalayan Club in 1928. During World War II, he briefly returned to military duty and worked at Shimla. He was appointed CIE in 1944.

After his career in the Royal Engineers and Survey of India, Phillimore authored several articles on early surveying and map-making in India. He died in India in 1964. He died at Gulmarg and he was buried with military honours at Srinagar. He was married to Eileen Elizabeth, daughter of Samuel Crosthwait in 1910. They had no children.
