= Walter Short =

U.S. Army Major general

Walter Campbell Short
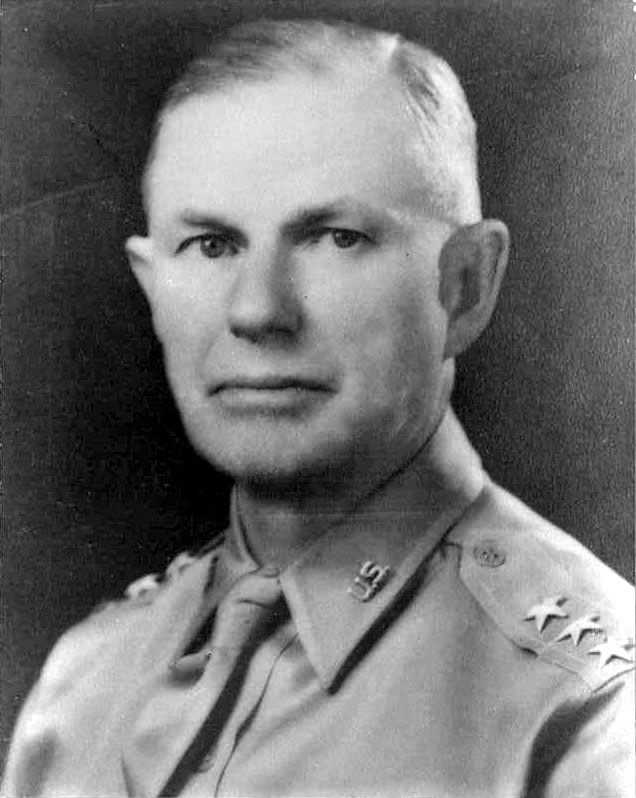
- Lieutenant General Walter C. Short
- Born: March 30, 1880; Fillmore, Illinois, U.S.
- Died: September 3, 1949 (aged 69); Dallas, Texas, U.S.
- Military career
- Allegiance: United States of America
- Branch: United States Army
- Service years: 1902–1942
- Rank: Lieutenant General (temporary); Major General (retired list)
- Commands: 1st Infantry Division; I Corps; Hawaiian Department
- Conflicts: Philippine–American War; Border War; World War I World War II
- Awards: Army Distinguished Service Medal

Walter Campbell Short (March 30, 1880 – September 3, 1949) was a lieutenant general (temporary rank) and major general of the United States Army and the U.S. military commander responsible for the defense of U.S. military installations in Hawaii at the time of the Japanese attack on Pearl Harbor on December 7, 1941.

== Early life ==
Short was born in 1880 in Fillmore, Illinois. The son of a doctor, he graduated from the University of Illinois in 1901. He then taught mathematics for a year at a military academy.

== Military career ==
=== Pre-World War II service ===
He was commissioned as a second lieutenant of infantry in the U.S. Army on March 13, 1902, and assigned duty at the Presidio of San Francisco. He served in the Philippines and later Alaska, and took part in the expedition into Mexico with the 16th Infantry Regiment in 1916.

During World War I, he served on the general staff of the 1st Division and as assistant chief of staff for the 3rd Army. He was awarded the Army Distinguished Service Medal for his efforts during the war. The citation for the medal reads:

The President of the United States of America, authorized by Act of Congress, July 9, 1918, takes pleasure in presenting the Army Distinguished Service Medal to Colonel (Infantry) Walter Campbell Short, United States Army, for exceptionally meritorious and distinguished services to the Government of the United States, in a duty of great responsibility during World War I. Attached to the Fifth Section, General Staff, General Headquarters, American Expeditionary Forces, Colonel Short rendered conspicuous service in inspecting and reporting upon front-line conditions pertaining to the work of his section. During the St. Mihiel and Meuse-Argonne operations of the 1st Army Corps, he efficiently directed the instruction and training of machine-gun units at every available opportunity during rest periods. Later, as Assistant Chief of Staff, G-5, 3d Army, he manifested the same assiduous devotion to duty in organizing schools, conducting necessary inspections, and carrying out the intensive training process.

After the war, Short became a member of the War Department General staff and served with the Far Eastern section of the Military Intelligence Division until 1924. He then attended the Army War College and after graduation served as a staff school instructor. He commanded 1st Infantry Division from 1938 to 1940 and I Corps from January 1940 to January 1941.

=== Hawaii ===
General George C. Marshall, the U.S. Army Chief of Staff, appointed Short to command the Army's Hawaiian Department on February 8, 1941 and promoted him to the temporary rank of lieutenant general. He earned the Distinguished Service Medal, and was considered to have had a successful career at that time, especially in light of his promotions during peacetime.

==== Japanese attack on Pearl Harbor ====
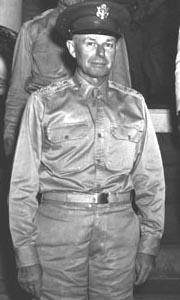
Short as a lieutenant general

On December 17, 1941, Short was removed from command of the Hawaiian Department as a result of the Japanese attack on Pearl Harbor, and was ordered back to Washington, D.C. by General Marshall. He reverted to his permanent rank of major general, as his temporary rank of lieutenant general had been contingent on his command.

On February 28, 1942, he retired from the Army, later heading the traffic department at a Ford Motor Company plant in Dallas, Texas. He briefly returned to active duty from October 3, 1945 to February 28, 1946. He retired for the final time in 1946, and died in 1949 in Dallas of a chronic heart ailment.

==== Roberts Commission ====
The Roberts Commission, headed by U.S. Supreme Court Associate Justice Owen J. Roberts, was formed soon after the Japanese attack on the Hawaiian Islands. General Short, along with Navy Commander in Chief, U.S. Fleet and Pacific Fleet, Admiral Husband E. Kimmel, were accused of being unprepared and charged with dereliction of duty. The report charged that Short and Kimmel did not take seriously enough an earlier war warning and did not prepare for an air attack on Pearl Harbor.

In a letter dated January 24, 1941, Secretary of the Navy Frank Knox advised the Secretary of War, Henry L. Stimson, that the increased gravity of the foreign policy situation with Japan had prompted a re-study of the problem of the security of the Pacific Fleet while in Pearl Harbor. Knox wrote: "If war eventuates with Japan, it is believed easily possible that hostilities would be initiated by a surprise attack upon the fleet or the naval base at Pearl Harbor." The letter proceeded: "The dangers envisaged in their order of importance and probability are considered to be: (1) Air bombing attack (2) Air torpedo plane attack, (3) Sabotage, (4) Submarine attack, (5) Mining, (6) Bombardment by gunfire."

Knox's letter stated the defenses against all but the first two were satisfactory, described the probable character of an air attack, and urged the Army to prepare for such an attack. It concluded with recommendations for the revision of joint defense plans with special emphasis on the coordination of Army and Navy operations against surprise aircraft raids. It also urged the conduct of joint exercises to train the forces to meet such raids.

Stimson replied on February 7, 1941, that a copy of the letter was being forwarded to Short, with directions to him to cooperate with the local naval authorities in making the suggested measures effective. Admiral Kimmel and General Short received copies of these letters at about the time they assumed their commands.

The report found that, had the orders been complied with:

- the aircraft warning system of the Army should have been operating;
- the distant reconnaissance of the inshore air patrol of the Army should have been maintained;
- the antiaircraft batteries of the Army should have been manned and supplied with ammunition; and
- a high state of readiness of aircraft should have been in effect.

In fact, none of these conditions was in fact inaugurated or maintained, for the reason that the responsible commanders had failed to consult and cooperate as to necessary actions based upon the warnings and adopt measures enjoined by the orders given to them by the chiefs of the Army and Navy commands in Washington.

The Roberts Commission was not a court-martial proceeding nor a judicial tribunal. Rather, the investigations were for fact-finding. There is generally no right to "due process", in the sense of a right to counsel and to cross-examine witnesses at a fact-finding investigation.

Admiral William Harrison Standley, who served as a member of the Roberts Commission, later disavowed the report, maintaining that "these two officers were martyred" and "if they had been brought to trial, both would have been cleared of the charge."

===== Short's defense =====
In 1946 Short testified on his own behalf before Congress about the 1941 attack. Unlike some of his predecessors in Hawaii, Short was more concerned with sabotage from Japanese-Americans on Oahu. This led to Army planes being parked outside of their hangars so they could be more easily guarded. However, this made them easy targets for aerial attack, and many were subsequently destroyed on the morning of the attack. In explaining his reasons for his instituting an alert against sabotage only (local "Alert One" level), General Short stated:

- that the war warning message he received on November 27 contained nothing directing him to be prepared to meet an air raid or an all-out attack on Hawaii ("Alert Two" and "Three");
- that he received other messages after the November 27 dispatch emphasizing measures against sabotage and subversive activities;
- that the dispatch was a "do-don't" message which conveyed to him the impression that the avoidance of war was paramount and the greatest fear of the War Department was that some international incident might occur in Hawaii which Japan would regard as an overt act;
- that he was looking to the Navy to provide him adequate warning of the approach of a hostile force, particularly through distant reconnaissance which was a Navy responsibility; and
- that instituting higher level alerts would have seriously interfered with the training mission of the Hawaiian Department.

He also declared that he did not receive adequate warning and suffered from a lack of resources. He and his family attempted to get the Army to restore his rank of lieutenant general on the retired list, on the basis that warnings from the War Department prior to the attack were vague and in conflict. He requested, but did not receive, a formal court-martial.

== 1999 Senate resolution ==
On May 25, 1999, the United States Senate passed a non-binding resolution exonerating Kimmel and Short by a 52 to 47 vote. The resolution stated they had performed their duties "competently and professionally" and that the Japanese attacks were "not a result of dereliction of duty." "They were denied vital intelligence that was available in Washington," said Senator William V. Roth, Jr. (R-DE), contending they had been made scapegoats by the Pentagon. Senator Strom Thurmond (R-SC) called Kimmel and Short "the two final victims of Pearl Harbor." The resolution was originally attached as an amendment to the Department of Defense spending bill for FY2000 (S.1059) and cleared the Congress as a whole in October 1999, urging President Bill Clinton to restore Kimmel and Short to their full wartime ranks. However, neither Clinton nor any of his successors acted on the resolution.

== Movie portrayal ==
Short was portrayed by Jason Robards in Tora! Tora! Tora!.

== Awards ==

Army Distinguished Service Medal
Mexican Service Medal	World War I Victory Medal with four stars	American Defense Service Medal with "Foreign Service" clasp
Asiatic-Pacific Campaign Medal with one star	World War II Victory Medal	Legion d'Honneur (Officier) (France)

== Dates of rank ==
No insignia in 1901	Second Lieutenant, Regular Army: February 2, 1901
	First Lieutenant, Regular Army: April 4, 1907
	Captain, Regular Army: July 1, 1916
	Major, National Army: August 5, 1917
	Lieutenant Colonel, Temporary: July 30, 1918
	Colonel, Temporary: November 7, 1918
	Captain, Regular Army: August 26, 1919
	Major, Regular Army: July 1, 1920
	Lieutenant Colonel, Regular Army: October 6, 1923
	Colonel, Regular Army: October 1, 1933
	Brigadier General, Regular Army: December 1, 1936
	Major General, Regular Army: March 1, 1940
	Lieutenant General, Temporary: February 8, 1941
	Major General, Regular Army: December 17, 1941
	Major General, Retired List: February 28, 1942
