= Bankrupting the Enemy =

2007 book by Edward S. Miller

- Author: Edward S. Miller
- Published: 2007
- Publisher: United States Naval Institute
- ISBN: 1682478971

Bankrupting the Enemy: The U.S. Financial Siege of Japan Before Pearl Harbor is a 2007 economic history book by Edward S. Miller.

== Content ==
In Bankrupting the Enemy, Miller argues that economic sanctions held against Japan in response to the invasion of Manchuria and Second Sino-Japanese War, and the freezing of assets critical to the Japanese economy, forced them to declare war on the United States. It is the first book to be released that specifically focuses on the financial embargo of Japan, which Miller claims was the most critical aspect that pushed Japan towards attacking Pearl Harbor. The book posits that while President Franklin D. Roosevelt enacted policy to "bring Japan to its senses, not its knees", this goal was intercepted by bureaucrats who prevented Japan from buying any resources necessary for its economic survival.

== Reception ==
Strategic Studies Quarterly stated that "books about finance, international trade, and economic analysis usually do not end up in the collections of many military professionals; Bankrupting the Enemy should", and gave praise to its research and "easy-to-read style". Enterprise & Society was similarly positive, calling it a "fascinating and exceptionally presented book", and said that "the content is detailed and factual, but Miller's cleanly written narrative retains its interest and pace throughout."

Financial History Review was overall positive to Bankrupting the Enemy, saying "this is a great book, and it will be of interest to researchers and laymen, and everybody interested in the origins of the Pacific War, Japanese economic history and US policy history", however they noted that some aspects of the book, such as its elaborate descriptions of production processes, would not be of interest to all readers. They also lamented a lack of Japanese primary sources, as did The Journal of Economic History, who further criticised its dry tone, saying that it "reads as if a wartime bean counter were painstakingly describing the input-output matrix for the entire Japanese wartime economy", and went on to suggest that a cliometric analysis of the impacts of the economic sanctions would have improved the book.
