= Fillmore Township, Iowa County, Iowa =

Township in Iowa County, Iowa, U.S.

Coordinates: 41.556°N 92.006°W

Fillmore Township is a township in Iowa County, Iowa, United States.

== History ==
The first elections were held in Fillmore Township in 1852.
