= Fillmore Township, Montgomery County, Illinois =

Fillmore Township
- Township

- Location of Illinois in the United States
- Coordinates: 39°06′03″N 89°18′24″W
- Country: United States
- State: Illinois
- County: Montgomery
- Settled: November 5, 1872

Area
  - Total: 60.49 sq mi (156.7 km^{2})
  - Land: 60.49 sq mi (156.7 km^{2})
  - Water: 0 sq mi (0 km^{2})
- Elevation: 633 ft (193 m)

Population (2020)
  - Total: 832
  - Density: 13.8/sq mi (5.3/km^{2})
- Time zone: UTC-6 (CST)
  - Summer (DST): UTC-5 (CDT)
- FIPS code: 17-135-26090

Fillmore Township (formally Fillmore Consolidated Township) is a township located in Montgomery County, Illinois, United States. As of the 2020 census, its population was 832 and it contained 385 housing units. It contains the village of Fillmore and the unincorporated communities of Chapman and Van Burensburg.

== History ==
In 2016, Fillmore Township and South Fillmore Township voted to merge into Fillmore Consolidated Township.

== Geography ==
The consolidation with South Fillmore Township expanded Fillmore Township from 36.38 to 60.49 square miles, all of it land.

== Demographics ==
Historical population
Census	Pop.	Note	%±
1880	1,850		—
1890	2,051		10.9%
1900	2,209		7.7%
1910	1,955		−11.5%
1920	1,697		−13.2%
1930	1,002	(Note: South Fillmore Township (pop. 402) separated.)	−41.0%
1940	1,014		1.2%
1950	862		−15.0%
1960	780		−9.5%
1970	775		−0.6%
1980	778		0.4%
1990	739		−5.0%
2000	569		−23.0%
2010	616		8.3%
2020	832	(Note: South Fillmore Township (pop. 244 in 2010) merged.)	35.1%
U.S. Decennial Census

== Township Officials ==
Fillmore Consolidated Township elected its most recent board during the April 2017 consolidated election. Two officeholders from Fillmore Township, the Supervisor and Clerk, were reelected while a new highway commissioner and four new trustees were elected.

Office	Elected Official	Party	Took office	Residence
Supervisor	Scot Usher	Democratic	2009 Ɨ	Fillmore, Illinois
Clerk	Jeanna Lorton	Democratic	2009 Ɨ	Fillmore, Illinois
Highway Commissioner	Brent Harrison	Democratic	2017	Fillmore, Illinois
Trustee	Debbie Davidson	Republican	2017	Fillmore, Illinois
Trustee	Braunda Hopwood	Republican	2017	Fillmore, Illinois
Trustee	Wade Moore	Democratic	2017	Coffeen, Illinois
Trustee	Gene Smith	Democratic	2017	Fillmore, Illinois

Ɨ Served in this position prior to the consolidation with South Fillmore Township.
