= Fillmore, Illinois =

- Village
- Location in Montgomery County, Illinois
- Coordinates: 39°06′56″N 89°16′44″W
- Country: United States
- State: Illinois
- County: Montgomery
- Township: Fillmore

Area
  - Total: 0.96 sq mi (2.48 km^{2})
  - Land: 0.96 sq mi (2.48 km^{2})
  - Water: 0 sq mi (0.00 km^{2})
- Elevation: 637 ft (194 m)

Population (2020)
  - Total: 305
  - Density: 318.7/sq mi (123.05/km^{2})
- Time zone: UTC−6 (CST)
  - Summer (DST): UTC−5 (CDT)
- ZIP code: 62032
- Area code: 217
- FIPS code: 17-26077
- GNIS feature ID: 2398877

Fillmore is a village in Montgomery County, Illinois in United States. The population was 305 at the 2020 census.

== Geography ==
Fillmore is in southeastern Montgomery County, 14 miles (23 km) east-southeast of Hillsboro, the county seat, and 18 miles (29 km) northwest of Vandalia. According to the U.S. Census Bureau, Fillmore has a total area of 1.02 square miles (2.64 km^{2}), all land. Lanes Branch flows through the west side of the village, running southwest to the Dry Fork of Hurricane Creek, part of the Kaskaskia River watershed.

== Demographics ==
Historical population
Census	Pop.	Note	%±
1900	500		—
1910	499		−0.2%
1920	511		2.4%
1930	421		−17.6%
1940	458		8.8%
1950	384		−16.2%
1960	360		−6.2%
1970	397		10.3%
1980	350		−11.8%
1990	326		−6.9%
2000	362		11.0%
2010	330		−8.8%
2020	305		−7.6%
U.S. Decennial Census

As of the census of 2000, there were 362 people, 144 households, and 103 families residing in the village. The population density was 467.5 inhabitants per square mile (180.5/km^{2}). There were 154 housing units at an average density of 198.9 per square mile (76.8/km^{2}). The racial makeup of the village was 98.62% White, 0.28% Asian, and 1.10% from two or more races. Hispanic or Latino of any race were 1.38% of the population.

There were 144 households, out of which 33.3% had children under the age of 18 living with them, 58.3% were married couples living together, 9.7% had a female householder with no husband present, and 27.8% were non-families. 27.1% of all households were made up of individuals, and 16.0% had someone living alone who was 65 years of age or older. The average household size was 2.51 and the average family size was 3.01.

In the village, the age distribution of the population shows 27.6% under the age of 18, 7.7% from 18 to 24, 27.9% from 25 to 44, 19.1% from 45 to 64, and 17.7% who were 65 years of age or older. The median age was 37 years. For every 100 females, there were 93.6 males. For every 100 females age 18 and over, there were 85.8 males.

The median income for a household in the village was $30,313, and the median income for a family was $35,750. Males had a median income of $31,250 versus $18,333 for females. The per capita income for the village was $14,363. About 18.2% of families and 21.6% of the population were below the poverty line, including 36.4% of those under age 18 and 18.6% of those age 65 or over.

== Notable people ==
- Ray Richmond, pitcher for the St. Louis Browns; born in Fillmore
- Walter Short, United States Army major general; born in Fillmore
