= Export Control Act =

United States export control law

The Export Control Act of 1940 was one in a series of legislative efforts by the US government and initially the administration of President Franklin D. Roosevelt to accomplish two tasks: to avoid scarcity of critical commodities in a likely prewar environment and to limit the exportation of materiel to Imperial Japan. The act originated as a presidential proclamation by Roosevelt forbidding the exporting of aircraft parts, chemicals, and minerals without a license, and it was intended to induce Japan to curtail its occupation of the coast of Indochina.

The text stated that whenever the President deemed it "necessary in the interest of national defense," he could prohibit or curtail the exportation of military equipment, munitions, tools, and materials.

Although controls were first authorized in 1940 in regard to munitions and similar materials essential to the defense effort, the ban of oil and steel exports to Japan took effect in June-August of 1941. Its coverage was extended in 1942 to all commodities and broader geographic coverage after the United States entered World War II. The act was extended with modifications through 1948, and it was envisioned that remaining controls would soon disappear at the time of re-enactment in 1949.

The scarcity of certain goods in the world markets, however, made the continuance of controls necessary to prevent a drain on such goods from plentiful American supplies with its consequential inflationary effects. National security and foreign policy concerns, especially following the outbreak of the Korean War, were new and compelling reasons for passing the Export Control Act of 1949 and in extending it until (at least) 1958. The law included both domestic policies aimed primarily at conditions within the United States as well as controls directed at conditions outside the country, as instruments of American foreign policy.

That is exemplified by the restrictions on export of certain strategic or military items to the Soviet bloc or to other countries that it felt, if permitted, would be detrimental to US foreign policy during the Cold War.

The foreign policy motive became so strong that it brought legislation directing the president to enlist the co-operation of other nations in enacting controls on trade with the Soviet bloc to parallel those of the United States. The benefits of the various economic and military aid programs were to be withheld from nations unless they co-operated, as in the Mutual Defense Assistance Control Act of 1951.

== Background ==
=== "Moral embargo" ===
The act was seen as a codified "moral embargo" in that it was an expression of moral outrage stemming from the Japanese bombing of civilians in mainland China in the late 1930s. In June 1938, US Secretary of State, Cordell Hull condemned the slaughter and its "material encouragement." A month later, the Department of State notified aircraft manufacturers and exporters that the US government was "strongly opposed" to the sale of airplanes and related materiel to nations using airplanes to attack civilian populations.

=== End of commercial treaties ===
Following the failure of diplomatic efforts to protect endangered American lives, rights, and economic interests in China, America considered commercial retaliation against Japan, Japanese authorities, or Japanese-sponsored agents in China. The American government felt that its 1911 commercial treaty with Japan was not affording an appropriate level of protection to US commerce in areas within or occupied by Japan. Simultaneously, Japan's position under the treaty, as a most favoured nation, legally prevented the adoption of retaliatory measures against Japanese commerce. The United States gave its six months' notice of its withdrawal from the treaty in July 1939 and so removed the primary legal obstacle for embargo.

== Effects ==
The embargo, which halted the shipment of material such as airplanes, parts, machine tools, and aviation gasoline, was designed to be an unfriendly act. However, expanding it to include oil was specifically avoided. Since Japan was dependent on US oil, it was then thought that it would be a provocative step.

The act was expanded in September of that year to include iron and steel scrap, an act that Japanese Ambassador Kensuke Horinouchi warned Hull on October 8, 1940, might be considered an "unfriendly act

Controls were first authorized in 1940 in regard to munitions and similar materials essential to the defense effort, and they were extended in 1942 to all commodities. Always intended to be temporary, the 1940 act was successfully extended in 1944, 1945, 1946, and 1947.

== Postwar use ==
After World War II, the Export Control Act was expanded to prevent the diversion of advanced technology to the Soviet bloc and China and, in later years, to alter the behavior of foreign countries. Scarcity of certain goods in the world markets made the continuance of controls necessary to prevent a drain on such goods from plentiful American supplies, with its consequential inflationary influence. It was envisioned that remaining controls would soon disappear at the time of re-enactment in 1949, but national security and foreign policy, especially following the outbreak of the Korean War, were new and compelling reasons for extending the Export Control Act of 1949 in 1951, 1953, 1956 and again in 1958. The technology does not have to be military-specific; in 1982 Bell Labs's chess-playing computer Belle was impounded before it could travel to Moscow for an exhibition.

The Export Control Act of 1949 is an example of the type of legislation that it renders, subject to the regulations promulgated under it, all persons wherever situated. Under its provisions, exports of scarce materials are controlled both from an economic standpoint (short supply and consequent inflationary effect on foreign demand) and the security standpoint (autarchy and self-sufficiency in strategic resources not available in sufficiently large quantities). They are both domestic policies aimed primarily at conditions within the United States, but controls are also directed at conditions outside the country as an instrument of US foreign policy. That is exemplified by the restrictions on the export of certain strategic or military items to the Soviet bloc or to other countries that it felt, if permitted, would be detrimental to American foreign policy. The last motive became so strong that it brought legislation directing the president to enlist the co-operation of other nations in enacting controls on trade with the Soviet bloc to parallel those of the United States. The benefits of the various economic and military aid programs were to be withheld from non-cooperating nations.

== See also ==
- Causes of World War II
- Foreign Economic Administration
