= Tornado outbreak of March 5–7, 2022 =

Early spring tornado outbreak in the Midwestern United States

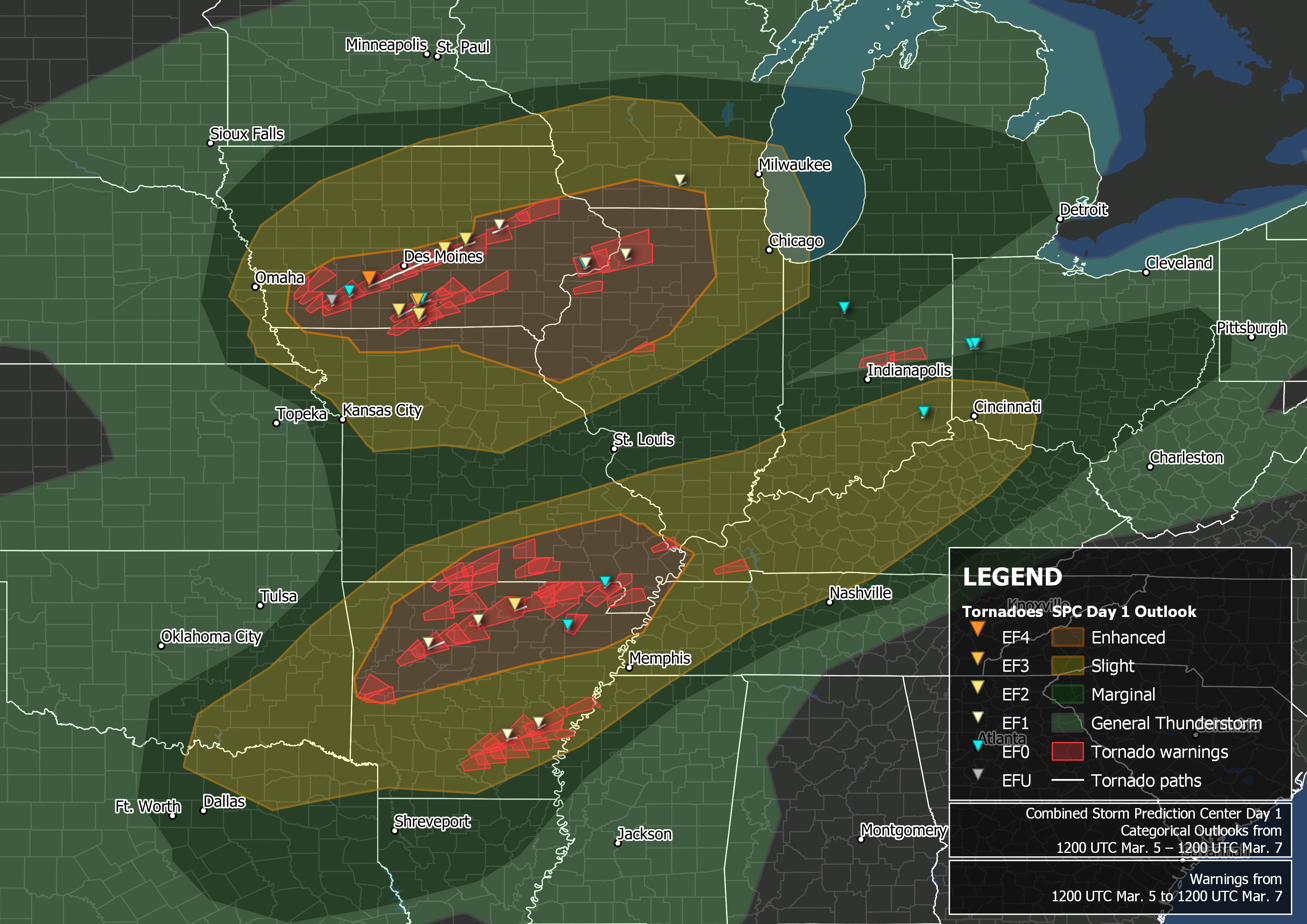
- Confirmed tornadoes and tornado warnings on March 5–7.

Meteorological history
- Duration: March 5–7, 2022

Tornado outbreak
- Tornadoes: 32
- Max. rating: EF4 tornado
- Highest winds: Tornadic – 170 mph (270 km/h) (Winterset, Iowa EF4 on March 5)
- Highest gusts: Non-tornadic – 81 mph (130 km/h) (Rockford, Illinois straight-line winds on March 5)

Winter storm
- Largest hail: 2.75 in (7.0 cm); Orient, Iowa on March 5

Overall effects
- Fatalities: 7 fatalities, 11 injuries
- Damage: $1 billion
- Areas affected: Midwestern United States, Mississippi Valley
- Power outages: ≥56,000
- Part of the tornado outbreaks of 2022

A significant early spring tornado outbreak occurred during the afternoon and evening hours of March 5, 2022 in the Midwest, primarily in the state of Iowa, before transitioning to a damaging wind event across northern parts of Illinois and Indiana. Multiple tornadoes were reported, several of which were produced by a dominant supercell thunderstorm in central Iowa. One long-track, low-end EF4 tornado caused major damage near the towns of Winterset and Norwalk, resulting in six fatalities. Multiple other supercells spawned along an area of moderate destabilization in northern Missouri, prompting further tornado warnings in southern Iowa, as they entered a highly favorable environment for maturing. Large hail and damaging wind gusts accompanied the storms, which continued their passage across the Midwestern states into overnight. More tornadic weather was confirmed in Arkansas and Missouri the next day and into the early morning of March 7. In addition to that, straight line winds killed one person near Hazel, Kentucky when a semi trailer was blown over on US 641. Another non-tornadic fatality occurred in western New York as the storm approached.

== Meteorological synopsis ==
=== March 5 ===
On March 4, the Storm Prediction Center (SPC) issued a slight risk outlook for severe weather for a negatively tilted shortwave trough positioned over the High Plains. The outlook included the possibility of strong winds, large hail, and a 5 percent chance for tornadoes, mostly throughout southern Iowa. The next day, the SPC upped their alert level to an enhanced risk, centered in Iowa, as a stronger certainty arose for severe weather. The probabilities for damaging winds were increased to 30 percent, and the probabilities for tornadoes were elevated to a 10 percent, unhatched area (indicating a <10% chance of EF2 or stronger tornadoes) centered along southwestern Iowa. The outlook referenced an increase in destabilization, coupled with a modest low level jet at around 40–50 kn (46–58 mph; 74–93 km/h), in an area with moderate dew points, at around 50–55 °F (10–13 °C). At noon, the SPC issued its first tornado watch, for southern Iowa and northwestern Missouri, discussing the moderate probabilities for tornadoes to occur, although a major tornado outbreak was not expected.

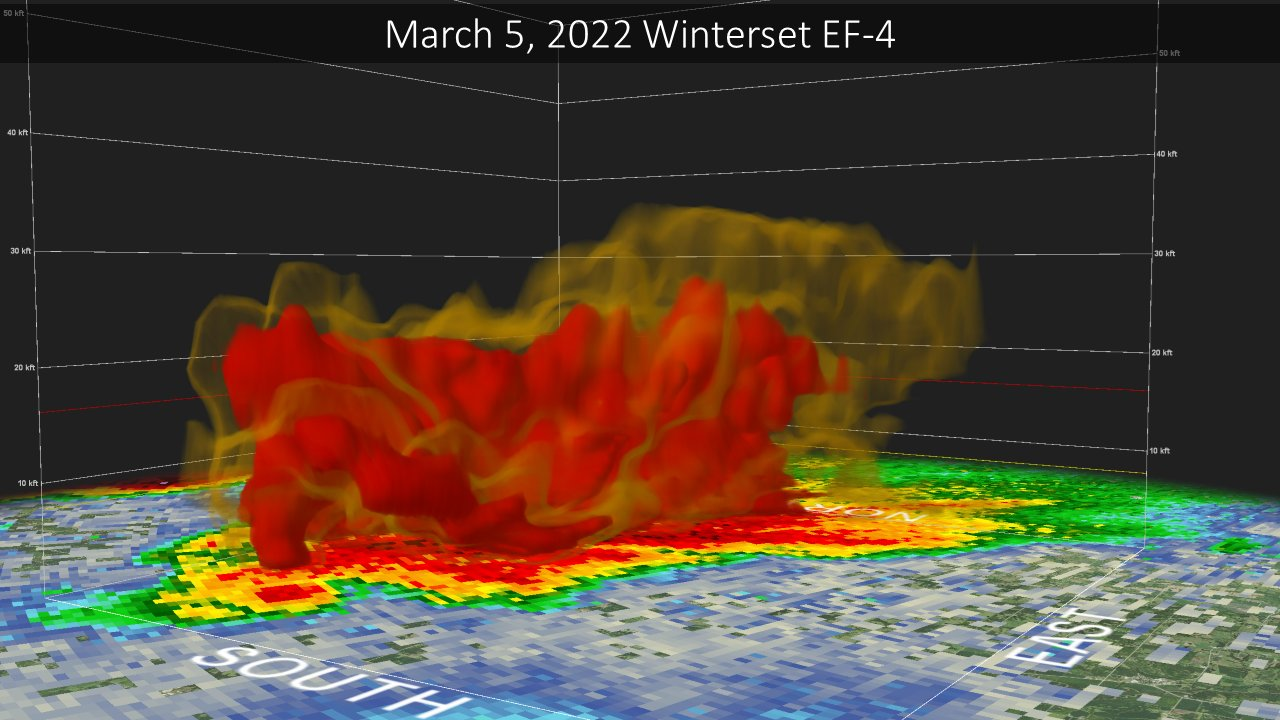
A volumetric (3D) rendering of a radar scan of the Winterset tornado

As the afternoon advanced, multiple supercell thunderstorms developed in the area of concern, rapidly developing into powerful, tornadic storms. One of these cells became dominant over southwestern Iowa, producing two weak tornadoes. It recycled its mesocyclone and produced a violent, long-track EF4 tornado, prompting the issuance of multiple PDS tornado warnings. It caused tremendous damage in the towns of Winterset and Norwalk, resulting in six fatalities. Following these fatalities, it caused moderate damage in Pleasant Hill. After the tornado dissipated, the supercell would produce three more tornadoes, one rated EF1, and two rated EF2. Multiple other tornadic storms would soon develop in northern Missouri and advance into southern Iowa, leading to more PDS tornado warnings. One of these tornadoes reached EF3 intensity, causing a fatality near Chariton. Large hail and a few damaging wind gusts accompanied the supercells.

As the supercells gradually weakened over eastern Iowa, they congealed into a long squall line, as the storm system moved into western Illinois and southern Wisconsin with weak tornadoes touching down in both states. As the overnight hours progressed, the squall line produced damaging wind gusts all throughout the north and central regions of Illinois and Indiana, including in the Chicago metropolitan area. One weak tornado touched down in Indiana, while another two more touched down in Ohio. It eventually progressed and dissipated over the Great Lakes, over northern Michigan and southern Ontario.

=== March 6–7 ===
After the initial round of storms dissipated overnight on March 5, a new shortwave trough began stationing itself over in the southern southwestern Plains on the late-morning of March 6. The SPC issued an enhanced risk for the regions encompassing northwestern Arkansas and southwestern Missouri. A 90–100 kn (100–120 mph; 170–190 km/h), 500 millibar low level jet ejected into the Ark-La-Tex region, interacting with dew points of around 60 °F (16 °C), indicating moderate instability. This created an environment conductive to severe weather, and a 10% hatched risk for tornadoes was introduced for the northern region of Arkansas, as supercells capable of producing a few strong tornadoes were expected. A 30% contour of damaging winds was also noticed, along the same general areas in Arkansas. As such, the SPC issued its first tornado watch for the day, encompassing extreme southeastern Oklahoma, northern portions of Arkansas, and the southern portions of Missouri, including the Missouri Bootheel.

Multiple supercells developed as the afternoon progressed, quickly maturing as they entered the unstable atmosphere stationed over northern Arkansas. Several tornadoes were reported, three of which were produced by a long-track, intense supercell. One low-end EF2 tornado struck Sage, Arkansas, injuring six people. Tornadic activity continued past midnight into the early morning of March 7. One non-tornadic fatality occurred early that morning when a semi truck carrying logs was blown over on U.S. 641 near Hazel, Kentucky, ejecting and killing the passenger. A large slight risk area was issued for that afternoon from northern Alabama northeastward through the Northeastern United States for the threat of damaging winds, although isolated tornadoes were possible from northern Alabama to eastern Kentucky. Scattered severe weather occurred in the southern part of the risk area while a narrow, but strong squall line produced widespread wind damage in the northeast that afternoon with a total of 194 reports of severe wind gusts and wind damage. However, no tornadoes touched down and no further injuries occurred. The severe threat ended once all the storms pushed offshore.

== Confirmed tornadoes ==
Confirmed tornadoes by Enhanced Fujita rating
EFU	EF0	EF1	EF2	EF3	EF4	EF5	Total
3	12	10	5	1	1	0	32

=== March 5 event ===
List of confirmed tornadoes – Saturday, March 5, 2022 (Note: All dates are based on the local time zone where the tornado touched down; however, all times are in Coordinated Universal Time for consistency.)
EF#	Location	County / Parish	State	Start Coord.	Time (UTC)	Path length	Max width
EF0	NE of Emerson	Montgomery	IA	41.03°N 95.38°W	21:02	0.01 mi (0.016 km)	17 yd (16 m)
EF0	Multiple storm chasers reported a tornado. Minor damage occurred.						
EFU	SSW of Corning	Adams	IA	40.9344°N 94.7859°W	21:38–21:40	1.48 mi (2.38 km)	40 yd (37 m)
EFU	This was the first tornado from the Winterset supercell. No damage was reported.						
EF0	N of Cromwell	Adams, Union	IA	41.0862°N 94.5078°W	22:01–22:05	2.84 mi (4.57 km)	100 yd (91 m)
EF0	This was the second tornado from the Winterset supercell. The tornado was confirmed from video evidence and caused no known damage.						
EF4	N of Macksburg to Southern Norwalk to NE of Newton	Madison, Warren, Polk, Jasper	IA	41.2334°N 94.2013°W	22:26–00:00	70.57 mi (113.57 km)	900 yd (820 m)
EF4	6 deaths – See article on this tornado – Five people were injured.						
EF2	NE of Leon to E of Derby	Decatur, Wayne, Lucas	IA	40.7595°N 93.708°W	23:07–23:33	19.42 mi (31.25 km)	300 yd (270 m)
EF2	This tornado passed just south of Garden Grove, ripping the roof off of a house and damaging or destroying several outbuildings. The tornado also passed near Humeston, producing additional damage to outbuildings, snapping power poles, and downing numerous trees.						
EFU	NE of Garden Grove	Decatur, Wayne	IA	40.8423°N 93.5849°W	23:20–23:24	2.07 mi (3.33 km)	60 yd (55 m)
EFU	A tornado touched down north of the previous tornado, causing no known damage.						
EFU	SE of Derby	Lucas	IA	40.9031°N 93.4387°W	23:28–23:33	2.07 mi (3.33 km)	60 yd (55 m)
EFU	This tornado touched down just north of and was on the ground at the same time as the previous EF2 tornado near Derby. No notable damage occurred.						
EF3	E of Derby to E of Chariton	Lucas	IA	40.9405°N 93.3854°W	23:33–23:53	11.28 mi (18.15 km)	350 yd (320 m)
EF3	1 death – This low-end EF3 tornado touched down after the EF2 tornado near Derby dissipated. Multiple homes were severely damaged or destroyed, a small music venue had its roof torn off, and gas leaks were reported. Barns and outbuildings were also completely destroyed, along with the Pin Oak Marsh Lodge Educational Center near Chariton. The tornado moved directly through Red Haw State Park, where small structures were destroyed at a campground, boat docks were destroyed, and one person was killed when an RV camper was thrown. Many large trees and power poles were snapped along the path, and one person was injured.						
EF2	SW of Allerton to E of Corydon	Wayne	IA	40.6834°N 93.3892°W	23:38–23:51	9.87 mi (15.88 km)	300 yd (270 m)
EF2	A strong tornado touched down near Allerton and clipped the southeastern edge of town, where a manufactured home had its roof torn off, power poles were snapped, and trees were downed. A concession stand was completely destroyed at the local baseball field, and two frozen turkeys that originated at a residence nearly a half-mile away were found at that location. A machine shed was destroyed near Corydon before the tornado dissipated.						
EF0	S of Chariton	Lucas	IA	40.9807°N 93.3198°W	23:40–23:42	0.25 mi (0.40 km)	60 yd (55 m)
EF0	This was a satellite tornado of the EF3 Chariton tornado. It looped around that tornado before being absorbed by the larger circulation, causing little to no damage.						
EF2	NW of Kellogg to NE of Newburg	Jasper, Poweshiek, Tama	IA	41.7455°N 92.9727°W	00:04–00:28	17.31 mi (27.86 km)	500 yd (460 m)
EF2	This large multiple-vortex tornado touched down three minutes after the EF4 tornado dissipated. Trees and power poles were snapped, and outbuildings were destroyed along the path.						
EF2	S of Tama	Tama	IA	{{|41.9024|-92.6332|name=Tama (Mar. 5, EF2)}}	00:33–00:42	8.54 mi (13.74 km)	200 yd (180 m)
EF2	This was the fifth tornado from the Winterset supercell. A house had its roof torn off, trees were downed, outbuildings were damaged, and vehicles were flipped.						
EF1	SW of Garrison to W of Urbana	Benton	IA	42.1106°N 92.1864°W	01:10–01:26	13.98 mi (22.50 km)	400 yd (370 m)
EF1	This was the final tornado from the Winterset supercell. Several power poles were snapped, and trees and outbuildings were damaged before the tornado moved into the northwest side of Vinton. In town, the tornado damaged many structures including mobile homes, homes, and buildings at an industrial park. The tornado continued to the northeast of Vinton where it damaged trees and outbuildings before dissipating.						
EF0	W of Davenport	Scott	IA	41.5374°N 90.7259°W	02:37–02:38	0.11 mi (0.18 km)	25 yd (23 m)
EF0	A brief, weak tornado damaged a shed and downed a few trees.						
EF1	WNW of Davenport	Scott	IA	41.5355°N 90.7032°W	02:37–02:41	4.09 mi (6.58 km)	300 yd (270 m)
EF1	Several barns and outbuildings were either damaged or destroyed, and trees were downed along an intermittent path.						
EF1	NE of Erie to NW of Prophetstown	Whiteside	IL	41.6757°N 90.0558°W	03:13–03:18	3.98 mi (6.41 km)	50 yd (46 m)
EF1	Farm sheds and trees were damaged along the path.						
EF1	SE of Stoughton	Dane	WI	42.871°N 89.1947°W	03:48–03:57	5.98 mi (9.62 km)	50 yd (46 m)
EF1	Several homes and outbuildings were damaged, and trees and tree limbs were downed.						
EF0	NE of Kilbourne to E of Easton	Mason	IL	40.1971°N 89.9508°W	04:11–04:19	6.93 mi (11.15 km)	50 yd (46 m)
EF0	This tornado damaged trees and knocked over six irrigation systems.						
EF1	S of Farmersville	Montgomery	IL	39.403°N 89.664°W	04:57–05:00	3.89 mi (6.26 km)	40 yd (37 m)
EF1	One farm home had its garage roof and porch awning ripped off. Several barns and other farm buildings sustained significant damage, and a semi-truck on I-55 was flipped.						

=== March 6 event ===
List of confirmed tornadoes – Sunday, March 6, 2022
EF#	Location	County / Parish	State	Start Coord.	Time (UTC)	Path length	Max width
EF0	SW of Royal Center	Cass	IN	40.8219°N 86.5484°W	07:05–07:06	0.41 mi (0.66 km)	25 yd (23 m)
EF0	Houses sustained minor damage, an empty silo was destroyed, and trees were downed.						
EF0	N of Versailles	Darke	OH	40.2395°N 84.5174°W	09:21–09:24	2.87 mi (4.62 km)	100 yd (91 m)
EF0	Two large barns were destroyed, several outbuildings and houses were damaged, and several trees were either snapped or uprooted.						
EF0	N of Russia	Darke, Shelby	OH	40.2467°N 84.4431°W	09:23–09:25	2.52 mi (4.06 km)	100 yd (91 m)
EF0	Two barns and a silo were destroyed and several other barns were damaged. Three homes sustained roof damage and trees were downed.						
EF0	SW of Cash	Craighead	AR	35.7242°N 90.9893°W	21:54–21:59	2.46 mi (3.96 km)	50 yd (46 m)
EF0	This weak, intermittent tornado moved through open fields, causing no known damage.						
EF1	WNW of Dover to N of Hector	Pope	AR	35.43°N 93.23°W	23:18–23:39	15.6 mi (25.1 km)	600 yd (550 m)
EF1	A few homes and outbuildings were damaged, and large sliding doors on a volunteer fire department building were blown in. Many trees were downed, one of which landed on a house.						
EF0	S of McDougal to NW of Pollard	Clay	AR	36.407°N 90.394°W	23:28–23:38	6.39 mi (10.28 km)	50 yd (46 m)
EF0	This weak tornado had an intermittent path and caused no known damage.						
EF0	ENE of Neelyville	Butler	MO	36.5866°N 90.4501°W	23:35–23:36	0.1 mi (0.16 km)	50 yd (46 m)
EF0	This brief tornado was caught on video. No damage was found.						
EF1	SW of Flag	Searcy, Stone	AR	35.8011°N 92.4292°W	00:26–00:29	2.40 mi (3.86 km)	200 yd (180 m)
EF1	Several trees were uprooted, roofing was removed from a barn, and a few other barns were damaged.						
EF2	SE of Melbourne to NW of Evening Shade	Izard, Sharp	AR	36.03°N 91.84°W	01:17–01:31	11.34 mi (18.25 km)	800 yd (730 m)
EF2	Several homes, barns, and sheds were damaged or destroyed in Sage as a result of this low-end EF2 tornado. One horse barn was destroyed, a modular home was torn apart, and one person was injured when a mobile home was rolled. A metal storage container where people were taking shelter was rolled as well, injuring all five of them, one seriously. Many large trees were snapped or uprooted along the path, and power lines were downed.						
EF1	SE of Dalton	Randolph	AR	36.371°N 91.1183°W	02:17–02:20	2.37 mi (3.81 km)	150 yd (140 m)
EF1	Several outbuildings were destroyed, trees were uprooted, and chicken coops were partially or completely destroyed.						

=== March 7 event ===
List of confirmed tornadoes – Monday, March 7, 2022
EF#	Location	County / Parish	State	Start Coord.	Time (UTC)	Path length	Max width
EF1	NW of Star City	Lincoln	AR	33.96°N 91.96°W	07:21–07:32	8.64 mi (13.90 km)	250 yd (230 m)
EF1	Poultry houses were damaged and trees were downed.						
EF1	NW of Gillett	Arkansas	AR	34.15°N 91.46°W	08:02–08:12	6.98 mi (11.23 km)	550 yd (500 m)
EF1	Damage was mostly to trees. Parts of the track could not be surveyed due to proximity to Jacobs Lake.						
EF0	N of Osgood	Ripley	IN	39.1406°N 85.2964°W	09:09–09:11	1.28 mi (2.06 km)	100 yd (91 m)
EF0	A barn was destroyed, a school sustained roof damage, and a home sustained roof and chimney damage. Sports equipment in a field was damaged, trees were downed, and tree limbs were broken.						

=== Winterset–Norwalk–Newton, Iowa ===
Winterset–Norwalk–Newton, Iowa
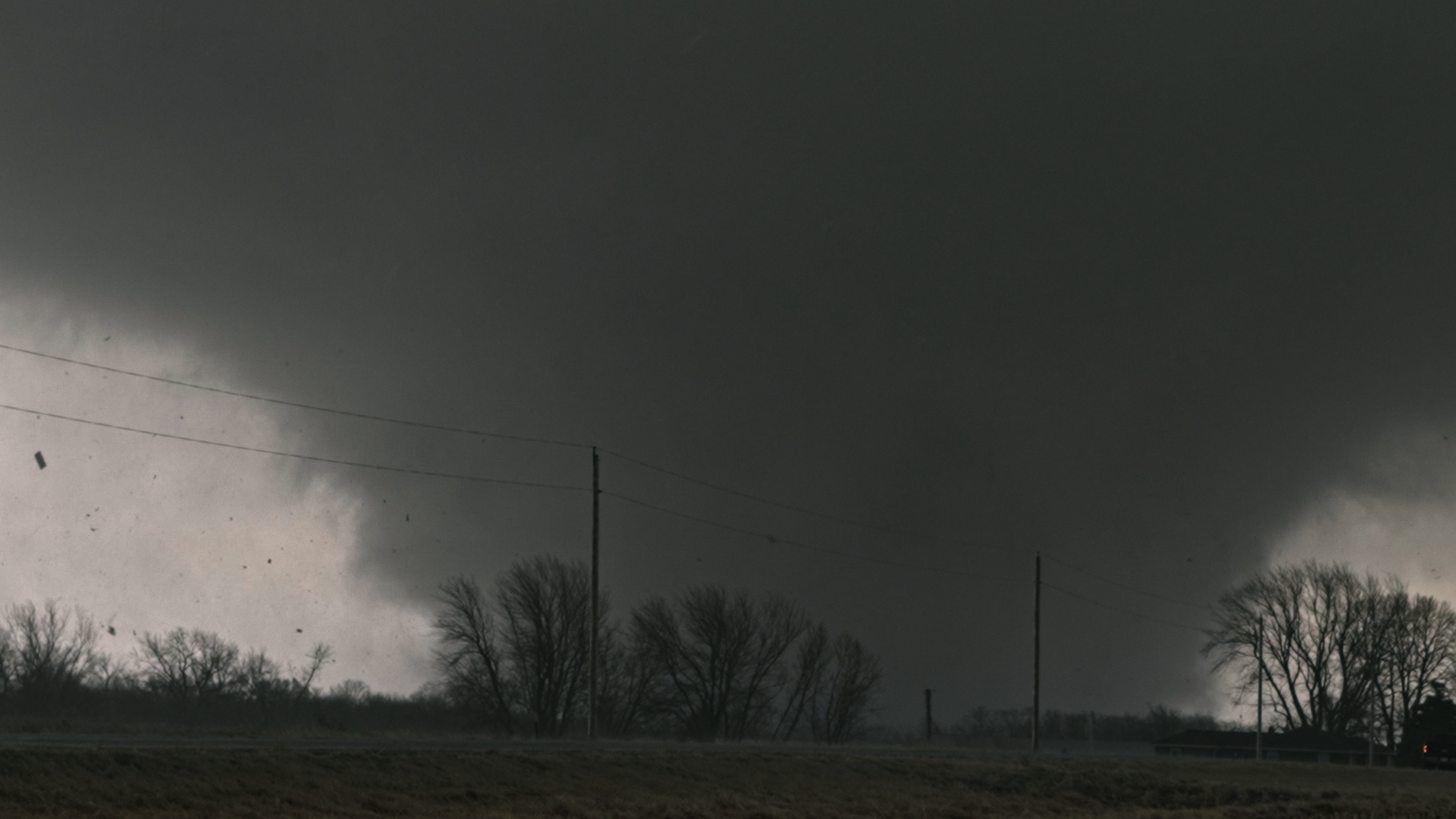
- The tornado at peak EF4 intensity southwest of Winterset, Iowa

Meteorological history
- Formed: March 5, 2022, 4:26 p.m. CDT (UTC−06:00)
- Dissipated: March 5, 2022, 6:00 p.m. CDT (UTC−06:00)
- Duration: 1 hour, 34 minutes

EF4 tornado
- on the Enhanced Fujita scale
- Highest winds: 170 mph (270 km/h)

Overall effects
- Fatalities: 6
- Injuries: 5
- Damage: $220 million (2022 USD) (Costliest tornado in 2022)

This violent multiple-vortex wedge tornado inflicted major damage along its path and caused six fatalities. The tornado was the deadliest and most intense of the outbreak, and was the third tornado produced by the long-tracked Winterset supercell. It first touched down near the intersection of Deer Run Avenue and 280th Street to the north of Macksburg. Moving northeast, the tornado began to rapidly intensify while traversing mainly open farmland and forest. The tornado then began to approach the southern outskirts of Winterset as it crossed Carver Road just south of town. Here, the tornado exhibited multiple vortices and reached EF4 strength, its point of maximum intensity. Several homes were severely damaged or destroyed, a few of which were leveled or swept away. Cars were flipped and thrown, outbuildings were obliterated, debris was strewn long distances, and many large trees were snapped and denuded in this area as well. All six fatalities from the tornado occurred in the Winterset area, including four members of a family who were killed in the destruction of their home.

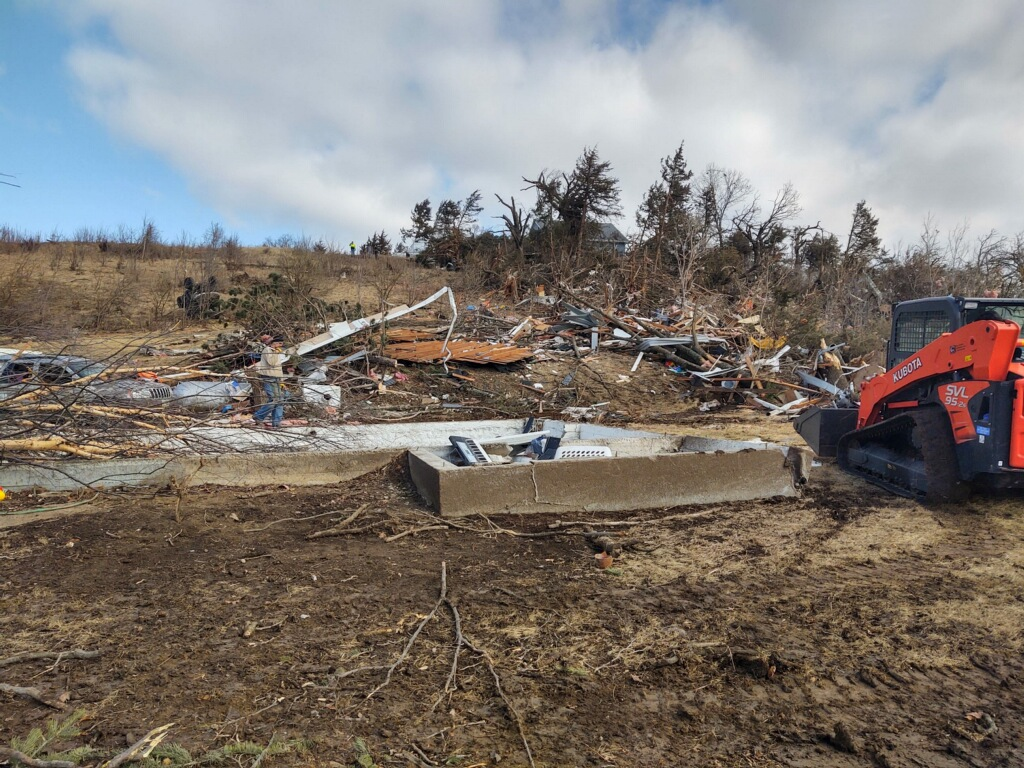
Foundation of a house that was swept away to the southwest of Winterset, Iowa, where the tornado was at peak intensity.

After the large and destructive tornado exited the Winterset area, it continued to the northeast and passed through rural areas near Patterson, continuing to exhibit a multi-vortex structure but causing little damage as moved through sparsely populated areas. The tornado then weakened some but remained strong as it tracked through the southeastern fringes of the Des Moines metropolitan area, moving through the outskirts of Norwalk, Avon, and Pleasant Hill. Homes in this area sustained major structural damage, outbuildings, and garages were destroyed, many trees and power poles were snapped, roofing was torn off of a manufacturing plant, and the Norwalk Public Works building had its garage doors blown in. Continuing to the northeast, the tornado became increasingly rain-wrapped, downing more power poles and causing additional damage to homes as it passed south of Colfax, and then weakened further as it moved through Lambs Grove and the north side of Newton before dissipating. Damage in Newton consisted of downed trees, damage to a baseball field, and minor to moderate structural damage. The TPI Composites manufacturing plant had a large portion of its roof torn off near the end of the damage path. At least five people were injured. This tornado became the first EF4 tornado to affect Iowa since October 4, 2013, was the deadliest tornado in Iowa since May 25, 2008, the longest tracked tornado in Iowa since April 27, 2014, and the northernmost confirmed violent tornado so early in the season.

== Aftermath ==
Iowa Governor Kim Reynolds issued a disaster proclamation for Madison County due to the tornadoes that passed through, while also saying “our hearts go out to all those affected by the deadly storms that tore through our state today.” Iowa representatives Cindy Axne and Ashley Hinson wrote a letter to the National Weather Service looking for answers on why the tornado warnings were delayed by up to nine minutes. The letter read, “Delays of even a few minutes can mean life or death. We cannot allow Iowans to be in danger due to technical problems that go unaddressed,” which they called unacceptable and that the NWS has to address with highest priority. Red Haw State Park shut down after the storm. Just two days after the deadly tornadoes tore through Iowa, a winter storm dropped up to 5.8 inches (15 cm) of snow across the region.

== See also ==
- Weather of 2022
- List of North American tornadoes and tornado outbreaks
- List of F4 and EF4 tornadoes
  - List of F4 and EF4 tornadoes (2020–present)
- Tornado outbreak of June 1881
- Iowa tornado outbreak of November 2005
- Iowa tornado outbreak of July 2018
