= Winterset tornado =

2022 tornado in Iowa, U.S.

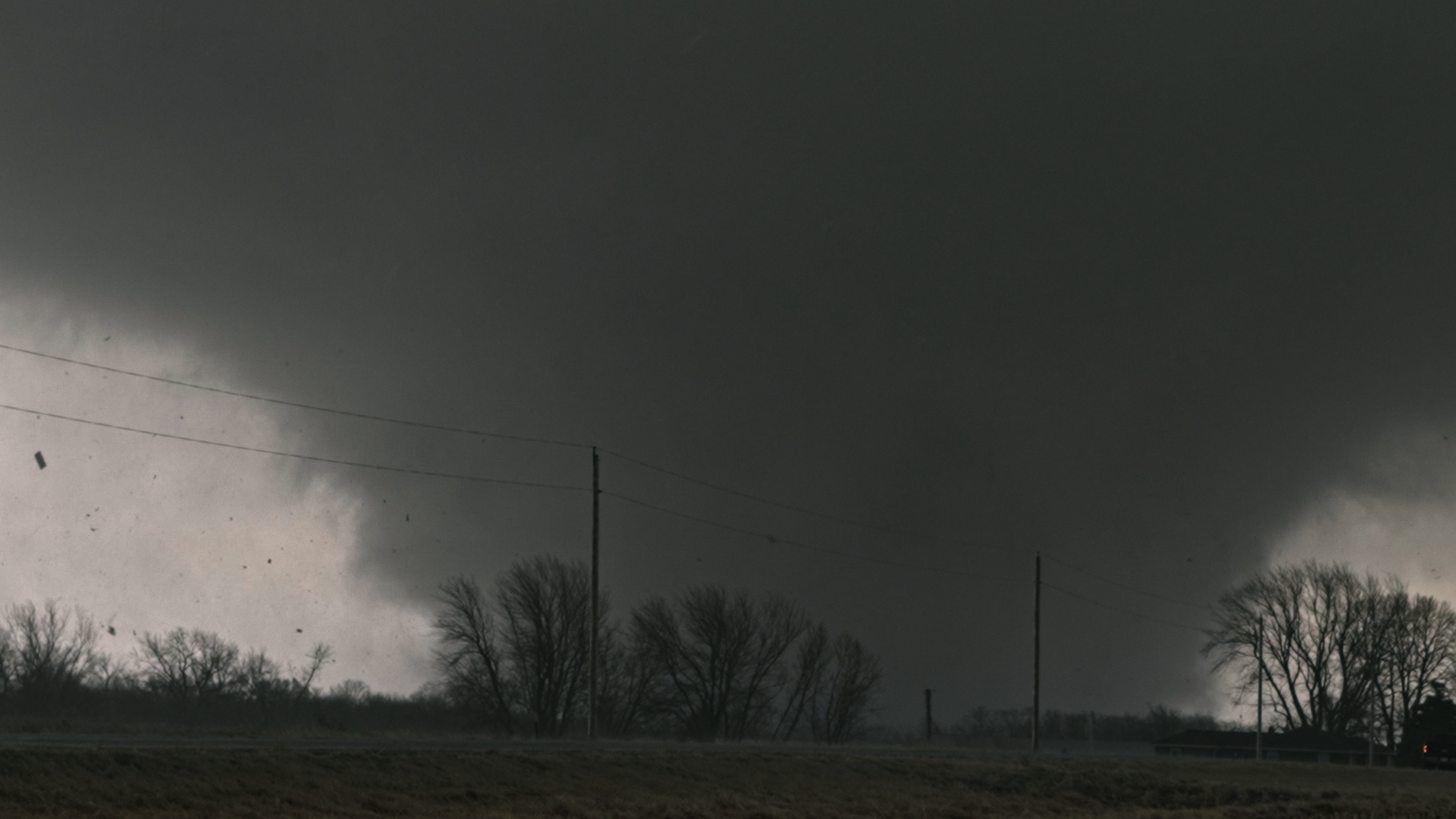
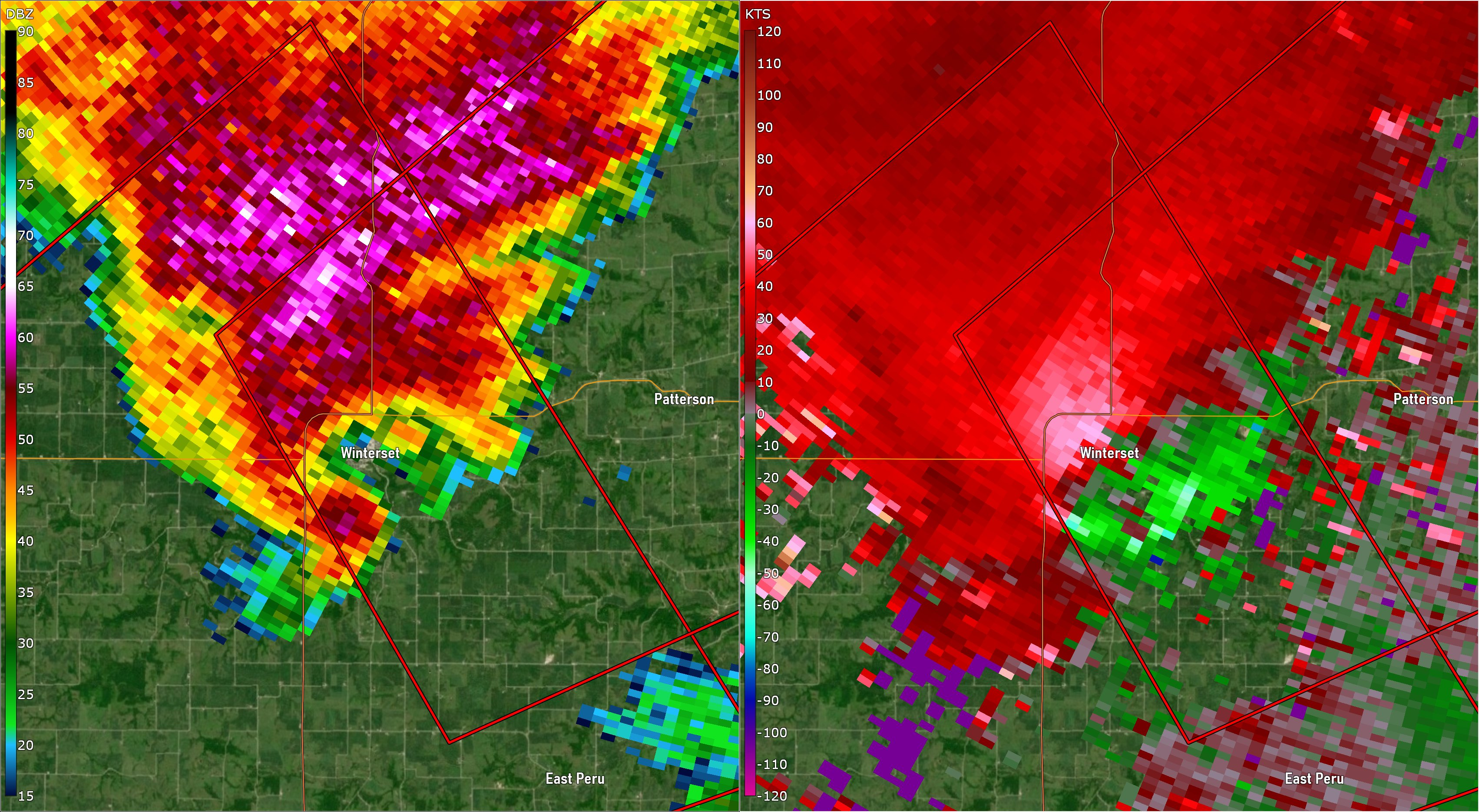
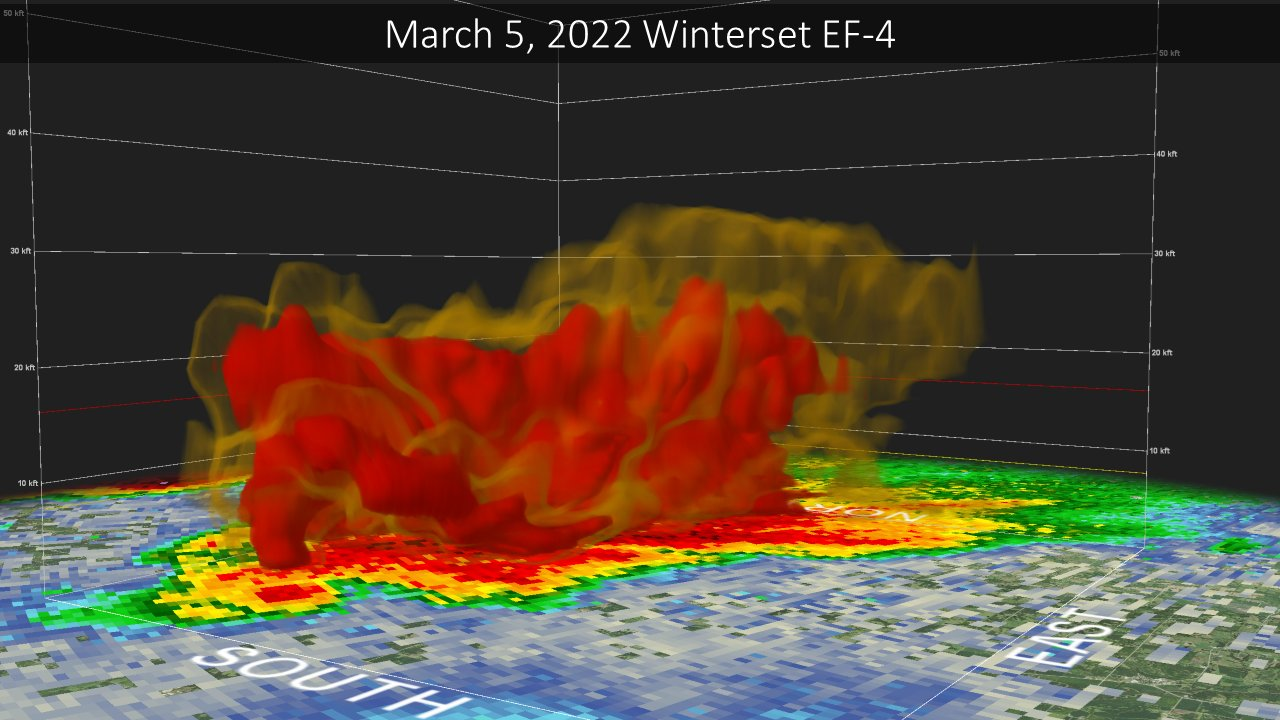
- Clockwise from top: Photo of the tornado at peak intensity near Winterset, Iowa; radar imagery of the tornado at peak intensity in Winterset; A volumetric (3D) rendering of a radar scan of the tornado

Meteorological history
- Formed: March 5, 2022, 4:26 p.m. CDT (UTC−06:00)
- Dissipated: March 5, 2022, 6:00 p.m. CDT (UTC−06:00)
- Duration: 1 hour, 34 minutes

EF4 tornado
- on the Enhanced Fujita scale
- Max width: 900 yards (0.51 mi; 0.82 km)
- Path length: 70.57 miles (113.57 km)
- Highest winds: 170 mph (270 km/h)

Overall effects
- Fatalities: 6
- Injuries: 5
- Damage: $220 million (2022 USD) (Costliest tornado in 2022)
- Areas affected: Des Moines metro area, Specifically Winterset, Iowa
- Part of the Tornado outbreak of March 5–7, 2022 and Tornadoes of 2022

In the afternoon hours of March 5, 2022, a large, long-track and violent tornado tracked through areas just outside of Winterset, located near Des Moines in the state of Iowa. The tornado damaged and destroyed many residences, with one home being leveled at low-end EF4 intensity, making it the first EF4 tornado to hit Iowa since an EF4 tornado struck rural Woodbury and Cherokee counties on October 4, 2013, and the most intense to touch down during the tornado outbreak of March 5–7, 2022. The tornado was also the costliest tornado of the year, inflicting $220 million (2022 USD) worth of damages along a 70.57-mile (113.57 km) path, the longest track since a long-tracked F4 struck the towns of Wright and Delta during an outbreak on June 7, 1984, and the deadliest tornado of 2022 and the deadliest tornado in Iowa since the 2008 Parkersburg–New Hartford tornado.

The tornado first touched down near Macksburg at 4:26 p.m., moving northeast while rapidly strengthening. As the tornado crossed Highway 169, it reached EF4 intensity, killing six people as it swept away several homes, debarked trees, and threw cars on Carver Road, located to the southwest of Winterset. The tornado continued to move through rural areas near Patterson at EF2 intensity as it debranched and defoliated trees before entering portions of the Des Moines metropolitan area, particularly Avon and Pleasant Hill, at EF2 intensity, where it would damage homes, trees, outbuildings and a large garage building. Maintaining EF2 intensity as it tracked southeast of Colfax, it destroyed barns and outbuildings, as well as snapping and defoliating trees, dealing its final EF1 intensity damage near Newton as it caused minor damage to homes, a baseball field and a manufacturing plant before dissipating at 6:00 p.m. to the northeast of the town.

== Meteorological synopsis ==
On March 4, the Storm Prediction Center (SPC) outlined a slight risk outlook for severe weather, mostly throughout southern Iowa. The SPC stated that "Large hail, damaging winds, a few tornadoes all appear possible.". The next day, March 5, the SPC updated the outlook to include an enhanced risk that was centered in Iowa, including the 30% probability for damaging winds, and a 10% unhatched area of tornado probabilities (indicating a <10% chance of EF2 or stronger tornadoes).

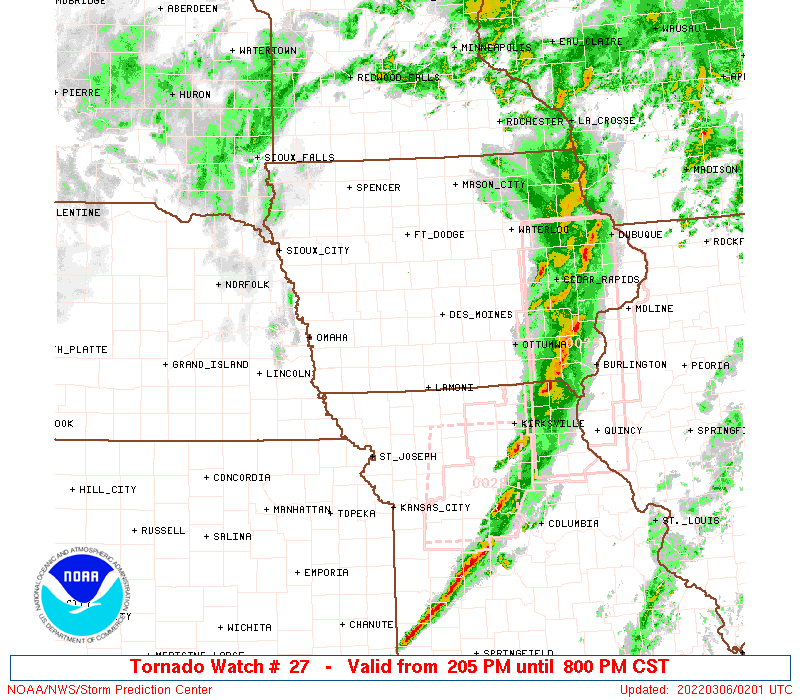
A tornado watch issued at 2:05 P.M. CST on March 5

A negatively tilted shortwave trough tracked northeastward across the Central Plains, Upper Mississippi Valley, and Upper Midwest on March 5. A strong Low Level Jet, moving at around 40–50 kn (46–58 mph; 74–93 km/h), transported moisture into eastern Kansas, northern Missouri, and southern Iowa, causing dew points to reach around 50–55 °F (10–13 °C). Regional soundings reported between 500 and 1000 J/kg of mixed-layer CAPE developing below -20 C 500 mb temperatures by the early afternoon hours. However, the SPC noted uncertainty regarding morning convection. Model hodographs noted that wind profiles near the low pressure system, as well as the warm front, strongly favored super-cells with enhanced low-level curvature of around 200–250 within the first kilometer of the atmosphere. The SPC in their March 5 forecast stated that strong convection would likely initiate near the triple point near the Missouri River and track across northern Missouri and south-central Iowa during the day. At around noon, the SPC issued its first tornado watch, for southern Iowa and northwestern Missouri, discussing the moderate probabilities for tornadoes to occur, although a major tornado outbreak was not expected.

Across the afternoon, multiple super-cells developed, with three developing into powerful tornado producing storms, with the northernmost one producing tornadoes near Corning, Iowa at 21:38 UTC, and Cromwell, Iowa at 22:01 UTC.

== Tornado summary ==
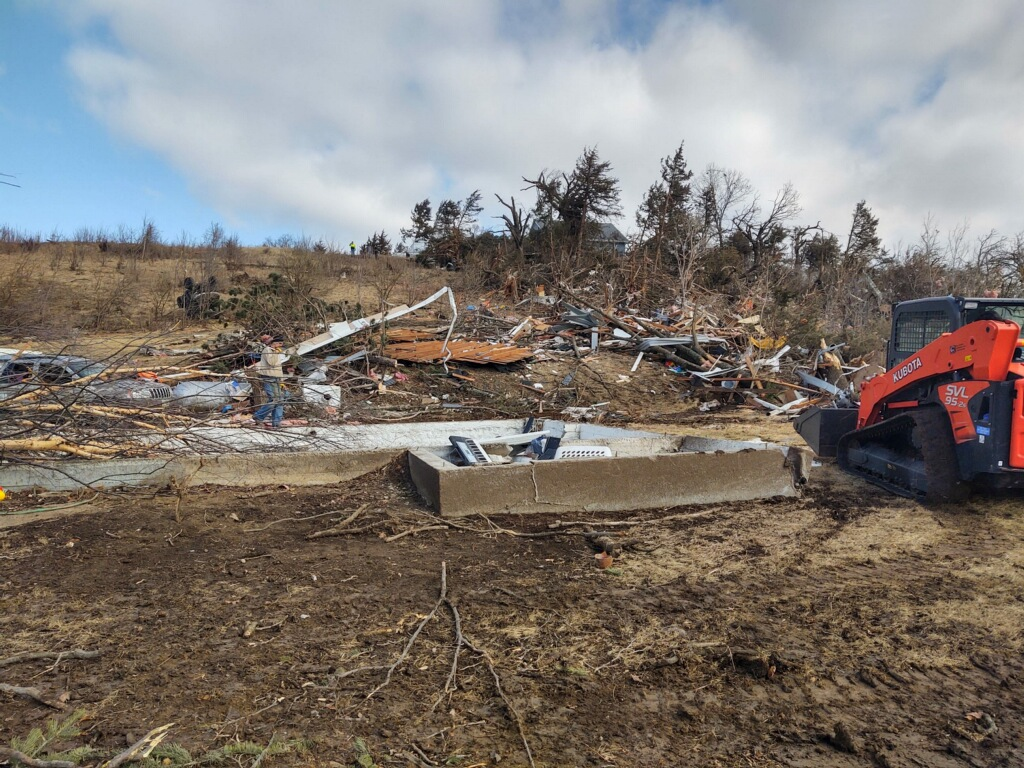
Foundation of a house that was swept away to the southwest of Winterset.

=== Initial formation and track near Winterset ===
At 4:26 p.m. CST, the tornado touched down near the intersection of Deer Run Avenue and 280th Street to the north of Macksburg. The multi-vortex tornado began to cause significant tree damage as it strengthened and tracked northeast towards Winterset, mainly through open farmland, patches of forest, and Pammel State Park. As the tornado approached Carver Road near the southwestern outskirts of Winterset, it rapidly intensified and became violent. As the tornado reached Carver Road, cars were flipped and thrown, outbuildings were obliterated, debris was strewn over long distances, many large trees were snapped and denuded, and a few homes were leveled or swept from their foundations by the violent tornado. One well-built home in the area was completely leveled at low-end EF4 intensity, with winds estimated to be at least 170 miles per hour (270 km/h). Six people who lived on Carver Road, including four members of the Bolger family, who were killed when the tornado completely destroyed the home they were sheltering in. A couple of other homes in the Carver Road area suffered loss of their roofs and exterior walls, and damage to those residences was rated EF2 to EF3. In addition to the fatalities, several people were also injured in this area. After the large and destructive tornado exited the Winterset area, it continued to the northeast and passed through rural areas near Patterson, exhibiting a multi-vortex structure but causing little damage as moved through sparsely populated areas. Northeast of Patterson, the tornado produced low-end EF2 damage as it snapped hardwood trees along Highway 35 and began to move towards the Des Moines area.

=== Des Moines metropolitan area to Newton ===
Two security camera angles showing the Norwalk Public Works building as it was struck by the tornado

The tornado maintained low-end EF2 strength as it approached and then entered the southeastern fringes of Des Moines metropolitan area, first striking the outskirts of Norwalk.

In Norwalk, the Windsor Windows and Doors vinyl production facility suffered partial destruction of its roof structure. In addition, the Norwalk Public Works Department building had its garage doors blown in, and surveillance cameras captured video inside the tornado as it impacted the building. Power poles in Norwalk were snapped, tree damage occurred, some homes were damaged along Coolidge Street, and barns and outbuildings were destroyed in the Norwalk area as well. Damage in town ranged from EF1 to low-end EF2 in intensity. Continuing through portions of the Des Moines metro, tornado then produced damage ranging from EF1 to mid-EF2 in intensity as it impacted portions of Avon and Pleasant Hill. Multiple houses in this area were heavily damaged, a few of which sustained roof loss. Outbuildings and garages were destroyed, many trees and power poles were snapped, and a MidAmerican Energy Company building suffered damage to its roof and garage doors. The tornado became increasingly rain-wrapped as it then exited the metro and moved into rural areas south of Mitchellville in Jasper County.

The tornado maintained low-end EF2 intensity as it tracked through Jasper County, damaging or destroying multiple large barns and outbuildings, as well as snapping wooden power poles as the tornado passed to the south and southeast of Colfax. One two-story farmhouse in this area had its entire roof structure torn off. As the tornado crossed the South Skunk River, it weakened to EF1 intensity, snapping trees as it moved through Lambs Grove, and into Newton. The tornado downed trees, damaged a baseball field, and caused damage to several structures in Newton, ranging from destroyed outbuildings to houses sustaining significant roof damage. As the tornado exited Newton, it struck the TPI Composites manufacturing plant just northeast of town, tearing off a large section of the roof. Shortly after this, the tornado dissipated after tracking for 70.51 miles.

The parent supercell went on to produce three more tornadoes, including two EF2s in rural Iowa, and an EF1 which struck Vinton.

== Aftermath ==
=== Impact and Fatalities ===
Over 50 homes suffered damage along the tornado's 70.57-mile-long path, including 35 to 40 homes that sustained major damage or were completely destroyed. The most severe damage occurred on Carver Road, where a home was completely swept away and nearby trees were debarked and denuded. Damage in this area was initially rated high-end EF3, but was later raised to low-end EF4 following further investigation by the National Weather Service. Over 10,000 were left without power in the Des Moines area as a result of the tornado and other weaker tornadoes during the outbreak. Six fatalities occurred, four of which were members of the Bolger Family.

Below is a list of the six fatalities caused by the tornado.

Name	Age	Refs.
Rodney Clark	64	
Cecilia Lloyd	72	
Kinlee Bolger	5	
Owen Bolger	2	
Micheal Bolger	37	
Melissa Bazley	63	

=== Cleanup and recovery ===
Following the tornadoes on March 5, Iowa Governor Kim Reynolds visited Winterset, stating “our hearts go out to all those affected by the deadly storms that tore through our state today”, and described the damage as "Unimaginable". Shortly after Reynolds issued a disaster proclamation for Madison County due to the damage. At least 200-300 volunteers from across Iowa, such as the local basketball team, the Winterset Huskies, and the Red Cross, which operated out of the nearby Four Mile Elementary, came out to help those affected by the tornado clean up the following day, with the New Bridge Church being used as the center for relief efforts, as well as a center to provide food, clothes, and toiletries. On March 7, Iowa OSHA On-Site Consultation staff gathered in Winterset to help coordinate cleanup and recovery efforts, offering their assistance, to contractors who provided equipment to local volunteers. A GoFundMe was started for the surviving members of the Bolger Family, which raised over $300,000 in less than 24 hours after it began and reached 95% of its goal by the end of the year. A similar GoFundMe was started for the Burkett family, who's home had suffered severe damage from the tornado. The Greater Madison County Community Foundation received more than $500,000 in donations, which it used to give over 70 grants for repairs. The historic Clark Tower was closed for over a month to clear downed trees that blocked the nearby path. The South Central Iowa Landfill suffered complete destruction with its main office completely destroyed and its large scales which were used to measure incoming loads of garbage completely lost. As a result, the landfill was forced to relocate its employees to a nearby construction office trailer, though the landfill itself remained open.

=== Warning delay controversy ===
Tornado Warnings, including those for the Winterset Tornado, were delayed by up to 10 minutes due to an error with a Dallas-owned fiberoptic cable that was responsible for receiving transmissions from a satellite network. The system had become overflown with requests, which combined with the relatively slow satellite transmissions led to delays in warning times. While the NWS issued a statement that they had fixed the issue by switching from their Dallas network and that the delays had minimal impact, Iowa state representatives Cindy Axne and Ashley Hinson issued a formal letter to the National Weather Service's acting director Mary Erickson, stating that "Delays in public notifications of severe weather are unacceptable and addressing them should be the highest priority."

=== 'Gainuss' A House campaign ===
Winterset residents Ryan and Mandy Gainuss suffered severe structural damage to their home, with its top floor completely detaching from the rest of the home and its walls being severely deformed by the tornado. Pekin Insurance, the family's insurance company, provided $150,000 in repairs, despite the fact that a structural engineer's survey determined that repairs would cost over $260,000. An attempted lawsuit against Pekin Insurance was resolved in favor of the insurers. As a result, the Gainusses purchased a nearby small shed without electricity, running water, or gas, which they lived in for over 2 years. In 2024, the Iowan religious non-profit organization GoServ Global, the local Foursquare Church, and local residents who organized a "I Helped 'Gainuss' A House" campaign began raising funds for the family to buy a new home. T-shirts and social media accounts were created with the "I Helped 'Gainuss' A House" slogan on them. A GoFundMe was also started, which raised $3,720. The family quickly received enough funds to create a new home, construction of which began by October 2024. The Heartland Roofing, Siding and Solar provided them with a free roof as well, and the couple moved into their new home by November 2025.

== See also ==
- 2008 Parkersburg–New Hartford tornado – Another violent and deadly tornado that struck rural portions of Iowa 14 years prior
- 2024 Greenfield Tornado – Another deadly and violent that struck rural portions of Iowa 2 years later
- Tornadoes of 2022
- List of Iowa tornadoes
