= Donald T. Barry =

American nurse, anesthetist, businessman, and politician

Donald Thomas "Don" Barry (July 30, 1928 – December 31, 2017) was an American nurse, anesthetist, businessman, and politician.

== Background ==
Barry was born on a farm near Farmersville, Illinois. He studied at Springfield Junior College, in Springfield, Illinois, the Alexian Brothers Hospital School of Nursing, in St. Louis, Missouri, and post graduate studies in anesthesiology at St. John's Hospital in Springfield, Illinois. Barry owned and operated Barry Nursing Homes (now Country Care Centers) in several locations in Illinois. He lived in Raymond, Illinois with his wife and family. Barry served in the Illinois House of Representatives in 1969 and 1970 and was a Democrat. Barry died in Sarasota, Florida.
