= Iowa Highway 46 =

State highway in Iowa, United States

Iowa Highway 46
- Iowa 46 highlighted in red

Route information
- Length: 6.568 mi (10.570 km)
- Existed: 1953–1998

Major junctions
- South end: Iowa 5 near Avon
- North end: Iowa 163 in Des Moines

Location
- Country: United States
- State: Iowa
- Counties: Polk

Highway system
- Iowa Primary Highway System; Interstate; US; State; Secondary; Scenic
← Iowa 44	→ Iowa 48

Iowa Highway 46 (Iowa 46) was a state highway in Polk County, Iowa. It began at an intersection with Iowa 5 near Avon. It traveled north and west through the industrial section of southeastern Des Moines. It ended at Iowa 163, also known as E. University Avenue, in Des Moines next to the Iowa State Fairgrounds.

The route was created in 1953 when a section of Iowa 60 was rerouted through Des Moines. Maintenance of the highway was turned over to local jurisdictions in 1998, after a new, controlled-access bypass carrying US 65 opened nearby and after the bridge over the Des Moines River was removed. Minimum speed limits were removed from the bypass after the Iowa 46 bridge closed because of a lack of river crossings for farm implements.

== Route description ==
Iowa 46 began at the intersection of SE 64th Avenue and SE 45th Street in rural Polk County near the unincorporated community of Avon. Iowa 5 formed the western and southern legs of the intersection, SE 64th Avenue continued east, and Iowa 46 headed north along a two-lane highway. As it climbed a 40-foot (12 m) hill, the roadway formed the western edge of Avon. On the other side of the hill, it descended 100 feet (30 m) into the Des Moines River valley. A single line of the Union Pacific Railroad, which, before 1980, was owned by the Rock Island System, passed under a bridge near the base of the hill.

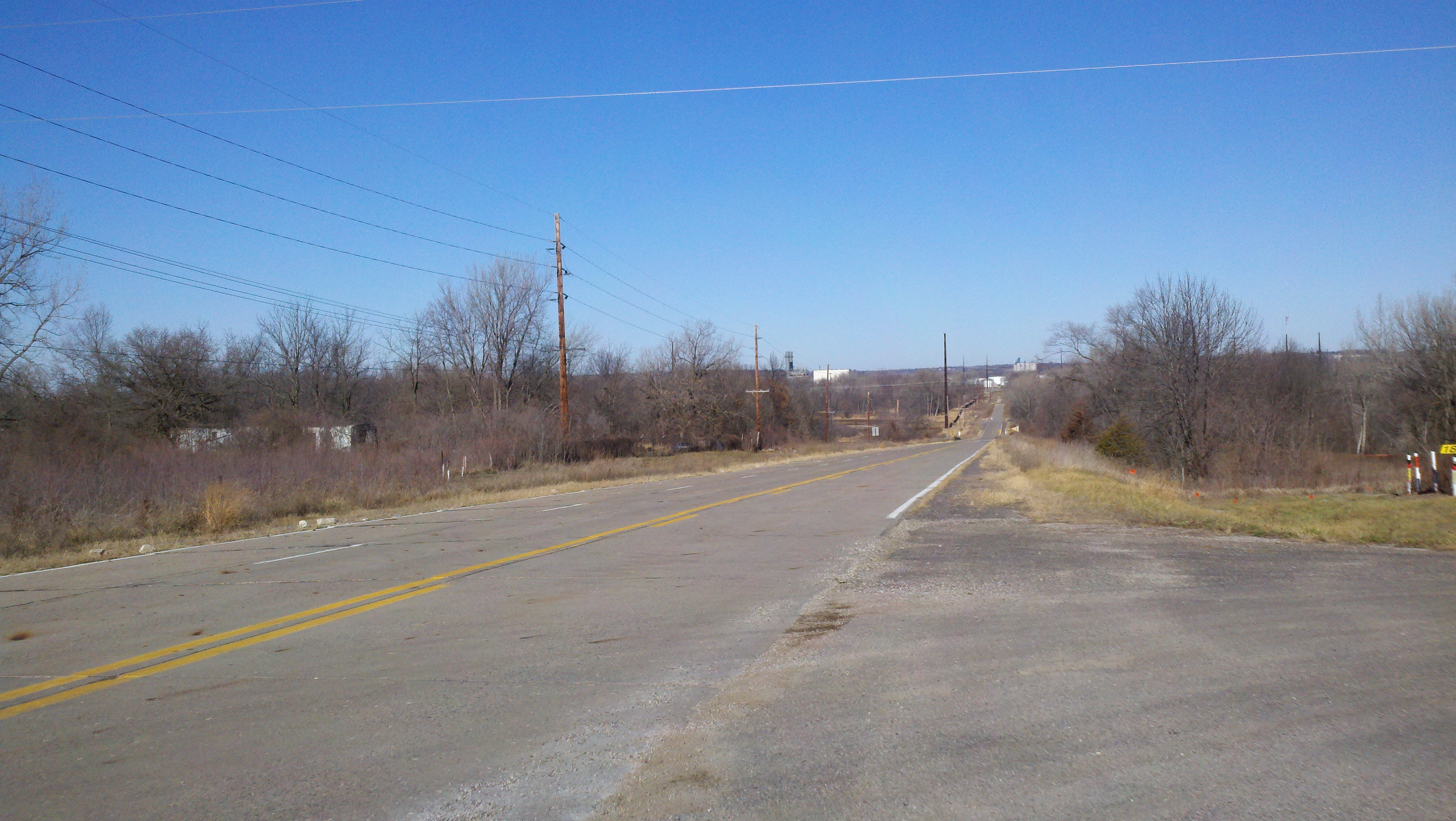
Iowa 46 descended down into the Des Moines River valley

Iowa 46 crossed the Des Moines River at the Pleasant Hill city limits, at the foot of the bridge was an electrical substation. The highway curved sharply to the west, followed by another sharp turn to the north onto SE 43rd Street. To the east of the route was a petroleum pipeline terminal and a spur line of the Burlington Northern and Santa Fe Railway (now BNSF Railway) ran parallel to the highway.

The route turned west onto Vandalia Road and into the Des Moines city limits. It passed through part of the city's industrial area, including a grain elevator and the municipal wastewater treatment plant. After it curved back to the north and onto E. 30th Street, the highway took a viaduct over a rail yard for the Iowa Interstate Railroad. For the remainder of its length, Iowa 46 served as a divider between Des Moines's Fairground neighborhood to the west and the Iowa State Fairgrounds to the east. The route ended at the intersection of E. 30th Street and E. University Avenue.

== History ==
Iowa 46 was created in 1953 when a segment of Iowa 60 was realigned through Des Moines. The entire route was paved upon designation. In the mid-1990s, a freeway bypass of the Des Moines metropolitan area was built through Pleasant Hill in close proximity to Iowa 46. In 1998, upon the bypass's completion in the area, US 65 was rerouted onto the new highway from its through-town alignment. The Iowa Department of Transportation (Iowa DOT) turned control of Iowa 46 over to local jurisdictions after the Des Moines River bridge was dismantled.

Removing the Des Moines River bridge created concern for local farmers. When the US 65 bypass opened, the entire route had a 65 mph (105 km/h) maximum speed limit and a 40 mph (65 km/h) minimum limit. With the removal of the Iowa 46, the nearest rural river crossing would be 19 miles (31 km) away at the Iowa 316 crossing near Runnells. The Iowa DOT removed the minimum limit upon the closure of the Iowa 46 bridge, a decision that was confirmed by the Des Moines Area Metropolitan Planning Organization two years later.

== Major intersections ==
The entire route was in Polk County.

Location	mi	km	Destinations	Notes
Avon	0.000	0.000	Iowa 5	Southern end
Pleasant Hill	1.877	3.021	Des Moines River bridge (demolished)	
Des Moines	6.568	10.570	Iowa 163 (E. University Avenue)	Northern end
1.000 mi = 1.609 km; 1.000 km = 0.621 mi: Closed/former
