= Red Haw State Park =

State park in Lucas County, Iowa

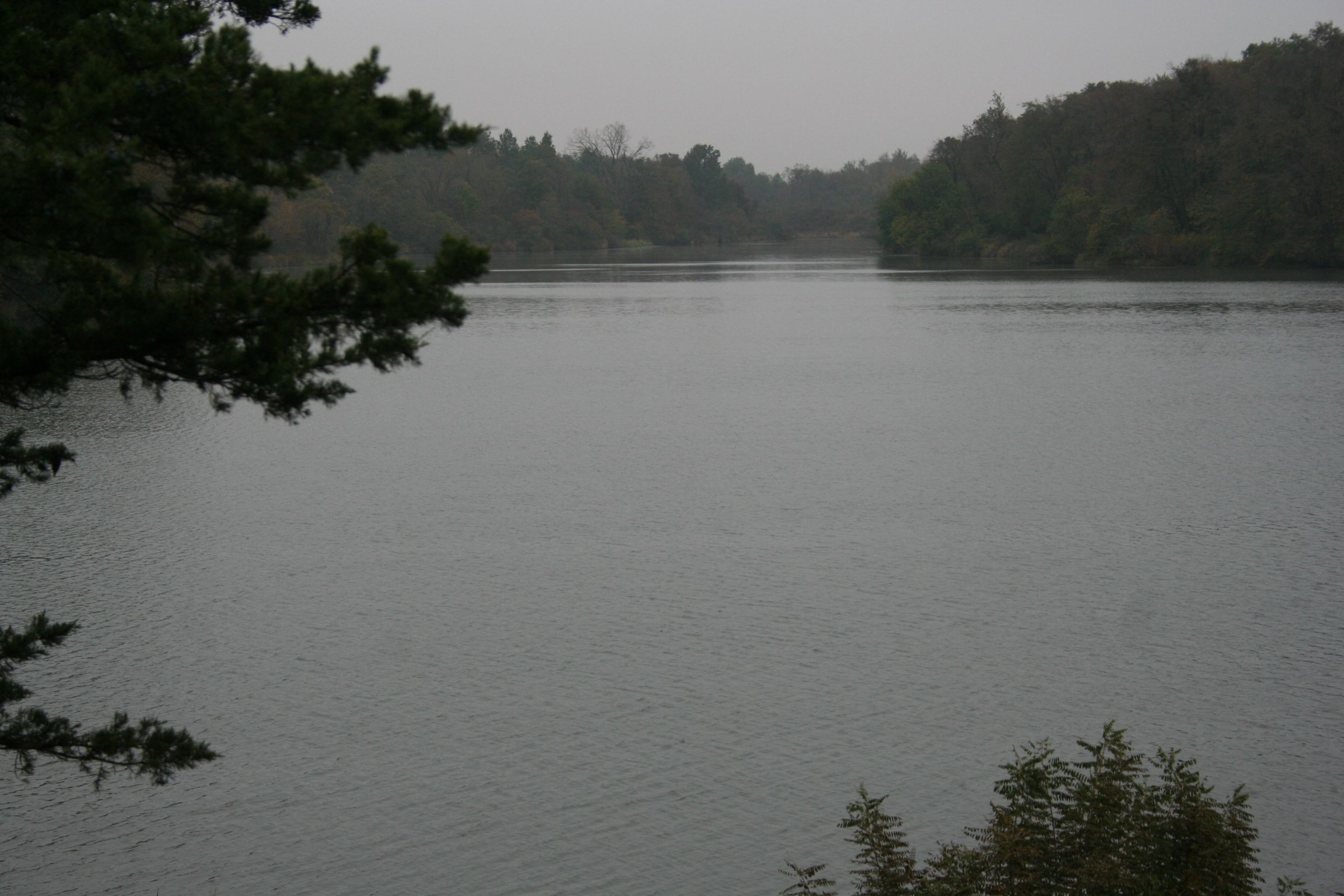
- An autumn dawn on Red Haw Lake

- Location within Iowa Location within the United States
- Location: Lucas County, Iowa, United States
- Nearest city: Chariton, Iowa
- Coordinates: 40°59′53″N 93°16′16″W
- Area: 649 acres (263 ha)
- Elevation: 974 ft (297 m)
- Established: 1939
- Administrator: Iowa Department of Natural Resources
- Website: Official website

Red Haw State Park is a state park in Lucas County, Iowa, United States, surrounding 72-acre (29 ha) Red Haw Lake. It is located near the city of Chariton.

On March 5, 2022, an EF3 tornado struck Red Haw State Park, killing one and injuring another, and causing considerable damage to structures and trees.
