= Zanesville, Illinois =

- Unincorporated community
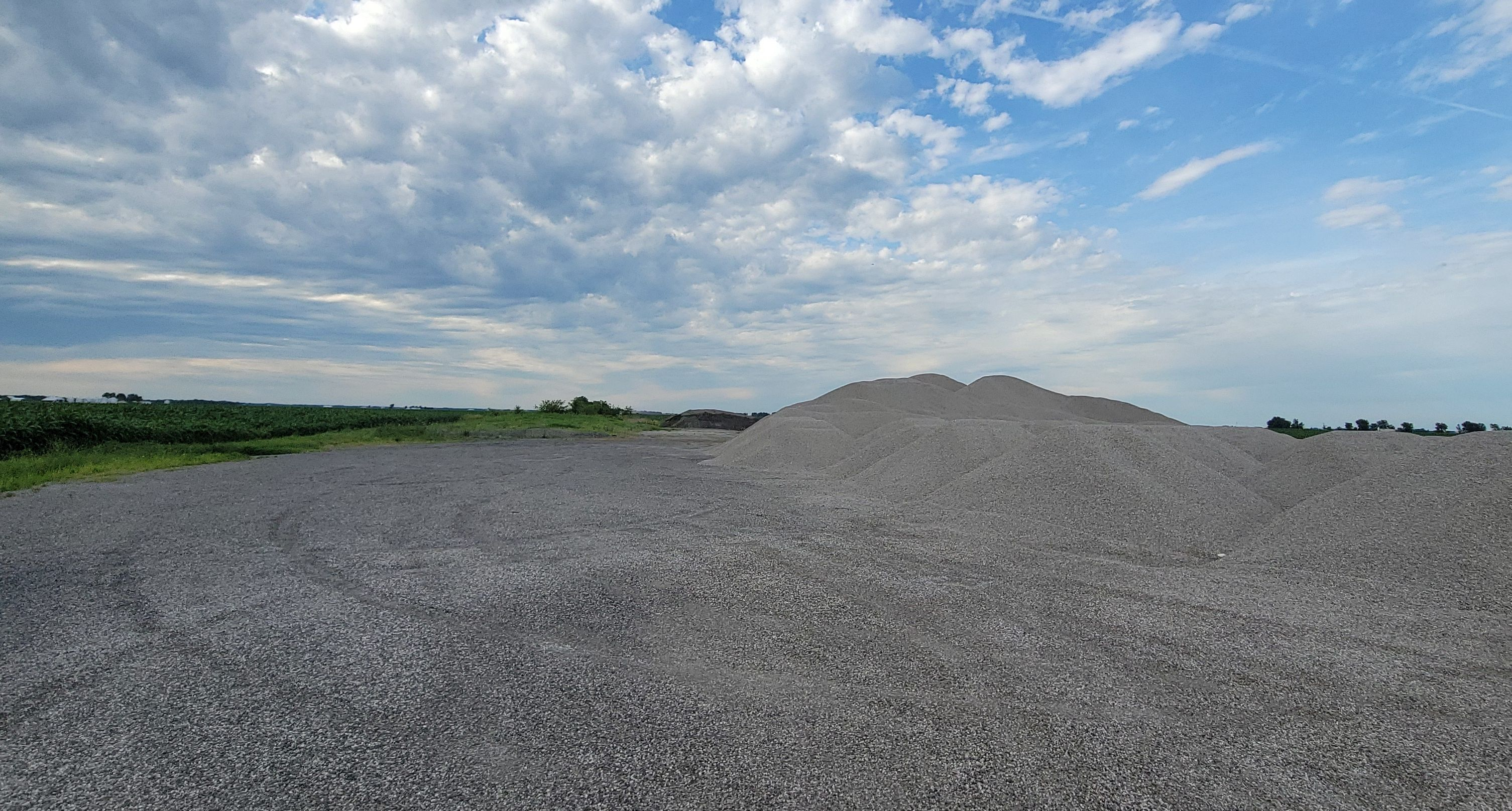
- Former site of Zanesville station, now a township staging yard for road construction materials

- Location within Illinois Location within the United States
- Coordinates: 39°19′20″N 89°39′11″W
- Country: United States
- State: Illinois
- County: Montgomery
- Elevation: 646 ft (197 m)
- Time zone: UTC-6 (Central (CST))
  - Summer (DST): UTC-5 (CDT)
- Area code: 217
- GNIS feature ID: 423346

Zanesville is a former unincorporated community in Zanesville Township, Montgomery County, Illinois, United States. Zanesville is 4.4 miles (7.1 km) west of Raymond, and just west of the Raymond exit from Interstate 55.

The community was originally located around 39°20′13″N 89°41′02″W, about 1.5 miles (2.4 km) west of its later location. After the Zanesville station was established and what was left of the community moved there, this original location became known as "Old Zanesville".

The community began with a tavern established around 1824 on the stagecoach road from Vandalia to Jacksonville. When first platted in 1828, the community was named Leesburg after a St. Louis merchant by the name of Lee, who was a business associate of founder George Brewer.

A post office opened in the community on June 26, 1838, under the name Hamlet. The name of the post office was changed to Zanesville in 1839. The town itself soon became known as Zanesville as well. By the 1860s, the town had two hotels, two saloons, and numerous stores.

In 1869, the Toledo, Wabash and Western Railway bypassed the town on its route from Decatur to St. Louis. In that same year, a large steam-powered flour mill with a capacity of 100 barrels per day was established in the town; however, it went out of business in the Panic of 1873. In 1880, the Jacksonville Southeastern Railway bypassed the town to the west, and many residents moved to that railroad's new station at Atwater. The Zanesville post office closed in 1881.

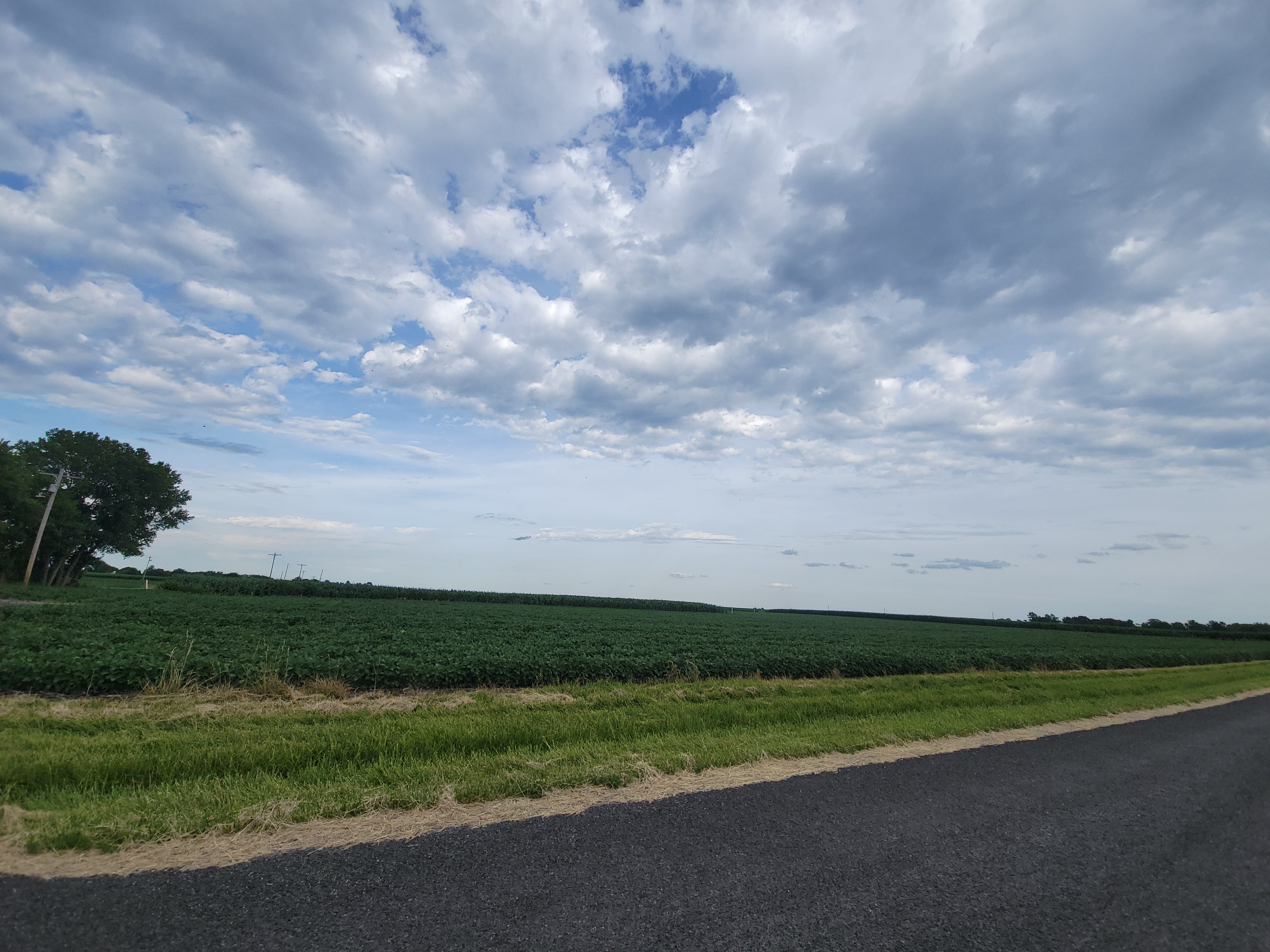
Soybeans grow on the former site of Old Zanesville.

In 1886, the Chicago, Peoria and St. Louis Railway built its line from Springfield to Litchfield a mile and half to the east. The remaining buildings in the town were moved to the site of the new Zanesville station on that railroad, which later became the Illinois Central. By the early 20th century, nothing remained of Old Zanesville, and the town site had become a corn field.

In 1944, the Illinois Central estimated the population of Zanesville at 15.
