= Farmersville, Illinois =

- Village
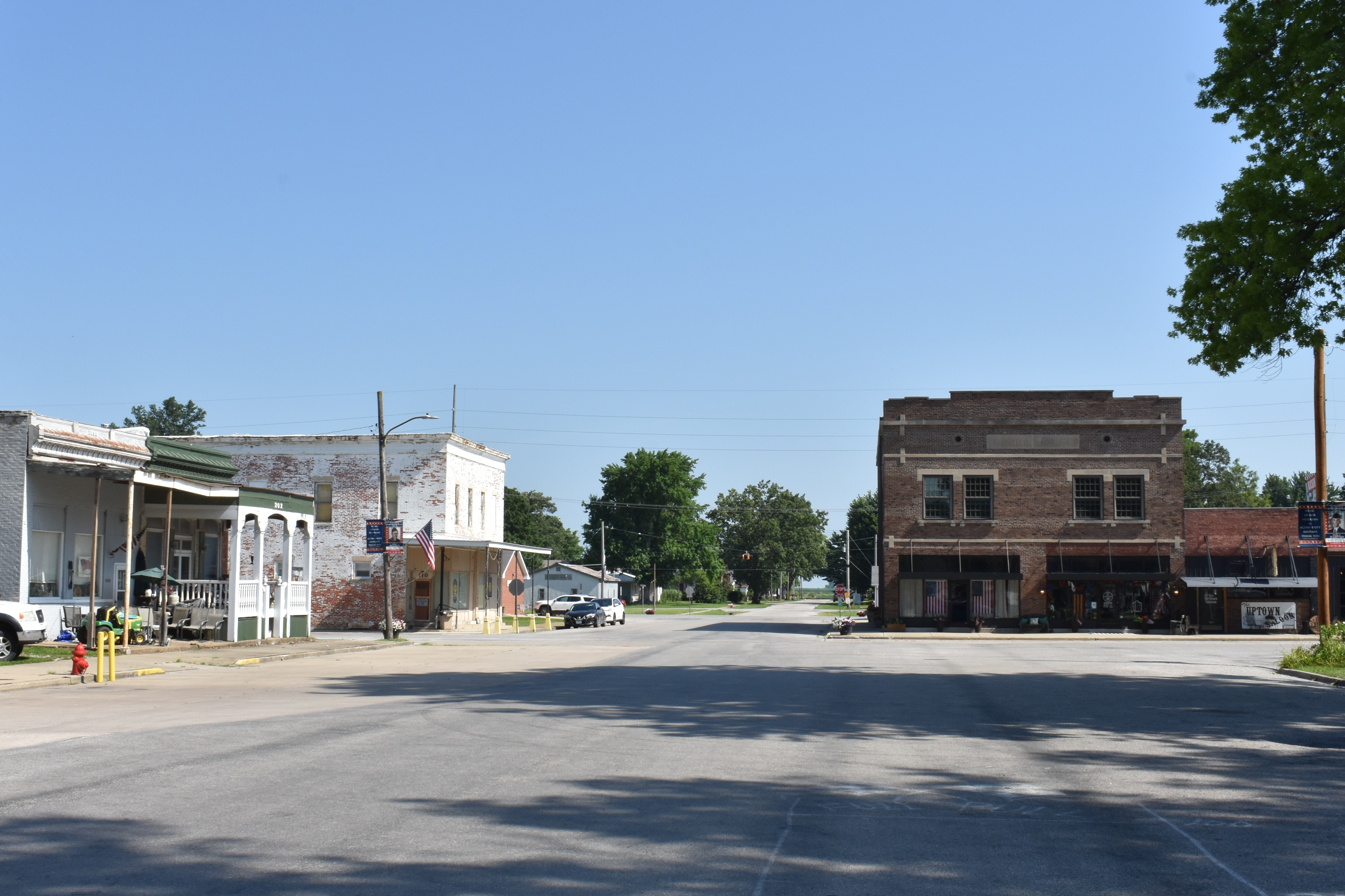
- Farmersville in July 2026

- Location in Montgomery County, Illinois
- Coordinates: 39°26′28″N 89°39′08″W
- Country: United States
- State: Illinois
- County: Montgomery
- Township: Bois D'Arc

Area
  - Total: 0.70 sq mi (1.82 km^{2})
  - Land: 0.70 sq mi (1.82 km^{2})
  - Water: 0 sq mi (0.00 km^{2})
- Elevation: 640 ft (200 m)

Population (2020)
  - Total: 689
  - Density: 979.2/sq mi (378.07/km^{2})
- Time zone: UTC-6 (CST)
  - Summer (DST): UTC-5 (CDT)
- ZIP code: 62533
- Area code: 217
- FIPS code: 17-25440
- GNIS feature ID: 2398863

Farmersville is a village in Montgomery County, Illinois, United States. The population was 689 at the 2020 census.

== Geography ==
Farmersville is in northern Montgomery County, 25 miles (40 km) northwest of Hillsboro, the county seat. It is located at the southern edge of Bois D'Arc Township. A small portion along Macoupin Creek extends south into northern Pitman Township.

Interstate 55 runs along the eastern border of the village, with access from Exit 72 (Mine Avenue / Main Street). I-55 leads north 23 miles (37 km) to Springfield, the state capital, and southwest 74 miles (119 km) to St. Louis.

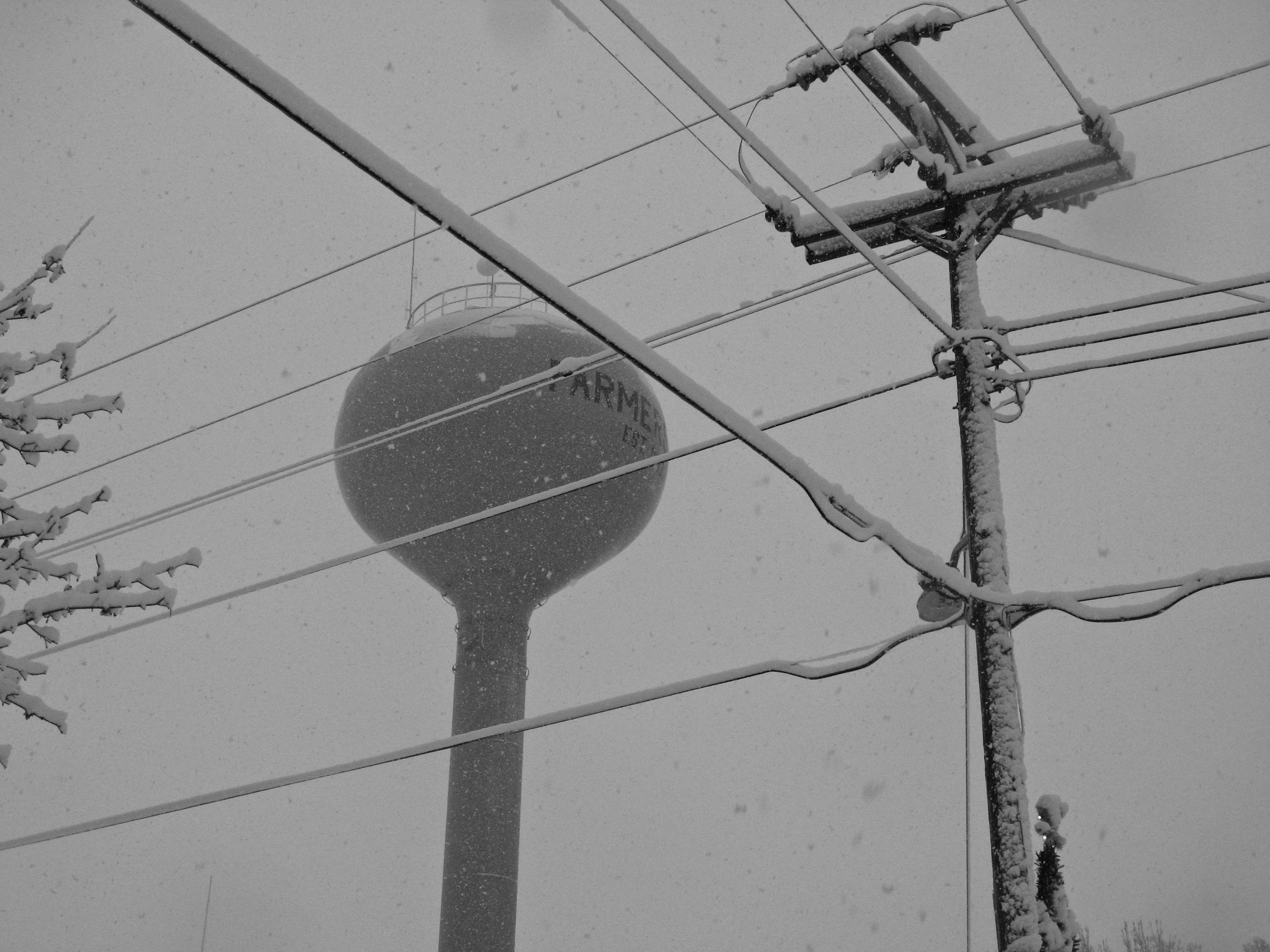
Farmersville water tower in winter.

According to the U.S. Census Bureau, Farmersville has a total area of 0.70 square miles (1.81 km^{2}), all land. Macoupin Creek crosses the southeast corner of the village, flowing southwest and then west to the Illinois River.

== Demographics ==
Historical population
Census	Pop.	Note	%±
1900	315		—
1910	533		69.2%
1920	513		−3.8%
1930	553		7.8%
1940	558		0.9%
1950	485		−13.1%
1960	495		2.1%
1970	495		0.0%
1980	686		38.6%
1990	698		1.7%
2000	768		10.0%
2010	724		−5.7%
2020	689		−4.8%
U.S. Decennial Census

As of the census of 2000, there were 768 people, 313 households, and 210 families residing in the village. The population density was 778 inhabitants per square mile (300/km^{2}). There were 350 housing units at an average density of 354 per square mile (137/km^{2}). The racial makeup of the village was 98.2% White, 0.4% Native American, 1.3% Asian, and 0.1% from two or more races. Hispanic or Latino of any race were 0.5% of the population.

There were 313 households, out of which 34.2% had children under the age of 18 living with them, 56.5% were married couples living together, 7.3% had a female householder with no husband present, and 32.6% were non-families. 29.7% of all households were made up of individuals, and 13.1% had someone living alone who was 65 years of age or older. The average household size was 2.45 and the average family size was 3.0.

In the village, the population was spread out, with 27.3% under the age of 18, 8.5% from 18 to 24, 30.6% from 25 to 44, 21.1% from 45 to 64, and 12.5% who were 65 years of age or older. The median age was 35 years. For every 100 females, there were 86.9 males. For every 100 females age 18 and over, there were 81.8 males.

The median income for a household in the village was $35,893, and the median income for a family was $41,417. Males had a median income of $35,263 versus $21,328 for females. The per capita income for the village was $16,606. About 5.5% of families and 8.2% of the population were below the poverty line, including 7.1% of those under age 18 and 12.8% of those age 65 or over.

== Local events ==
=== Irish Days ===
Farmersville currently has festival days entitled "Irish Days" which takes place the last weekend of May into June beginning on Thursday and ending Saturday night.

== Education ==
Farmersville is one of four main communities that make up the Panhandle School District (also known as Panhandle CUSD #2). The district's junior and senior high schools (Lincolnwood High School) are located in the same building in Raymond, which is located approximately ten miles southeast of Farmersville in Montgomery County. Farmersville itself is served by Farmersville Grade School (Pre-K through 1st Grade).

== Notable people ==
- Donald T. Barry, Illinois state representatives, nurse, and anesthetist; born on a farm near Farmersville
- Daniel Curzon, author, raised as Daniel Brown in Farmersville
- Milt Welch, catcher for the Detroit Tigers; born in Farmersville
