= Milt Welch =

American baseball player (1924–2019)

- Catcher
- Born: July 26, 1924; Farmersville, Illinois, U.S.
- Died: February 9, 2019 (aged 94)
- Batted: Right Threw: Right

MLB debut
- June 5, 1945, for the Detroit Tigers

Last MLB appearance
- June 5, 1945, for the Detroit Tigers

MLB statistics
- Batting average: .000
- At-bats: 2
- Stats at Baseball Reference

Teams
- Detroit Tigers (1945)

Milton Edward Welch (July 26, 1924 – February 9, 2019) was an American Major League Baseball catcher. He was born in Farmersville, Illinois, and played in one game for the Detroit Tigers, on June 5 during the 1945 Detroit Tigers season.

== Biography ==
Welch began his professional career with the Lockport Cubs of the class D Pennsylvania–Ontario–New York League in 1943. His best season in the minors was with the Hagerstown Owls of the class B Interstate League in 1944, when he had a batting average of .302 in 441 at bats. After his appearance with the major league Tigers he continued to play minor league baseball. His last professional season was in 1947 with the Danville Leafs of the Carolina League. Welch died on February 9, 2019, at the age of 94.
