= Lincolnwood High School =

Location
- 507 N. Prairie St. Raymond, Illinois 62560; United States
- 39.32690°N 89.57120°W

Information
- School type: public secondary
- Opened: 1962
- School district: Panhandle CUSD #2
- Superintendent: Aaron Hopper
- Principal: Ken Schuster
- Staff: 20
- Faculty: 15
- Teaching staff: 13.68 (FTE)
- Grades: 9–12
- Gender: coed
- Enrollment: 146 (2023–2024)
- Average class size: 38
- Student to teacher ratio: 10.67
- Campus: Farm town
- Colours: Orange, Black, White
- Athletics conference: MSM
- Sports: 9
- Nickname: Lancers
- Newspaper: Lancer Banner
- Yearbook: Lincolnwood Legend
- Website: www.panhandleschools.com/lhs

Lincolnwood High School is a public high school located in Raymond in Montgomery County, Illinois serving Panhandle Community Unit School District 2, located in Montgomery, Christian and Macoupin Counties. The school was created in 1962 with the consolidation of the Farmersville, Harvel, Raymond, and Waggoner High Schools. The present campus opened in 1972. There is an ongoing discussion about the possible consolidation with the adjacent Morrisonville Community Unit School District 1, located mostly in Christian County, and there have also been talks concerning the possible consolidation of those two districts with Nokomis Community Unit School District 22.

== Student organizations ==
Local Organizations

- Band
- Chorus
- Drama Club
- Lincolnwood Legend (Yearbook)
- Spanish Club
- Tech Club
- Student Council

National Organizations

- FFA
- Lincolnwood Community Service Organization
- National Honor Society
- SADD

== Interscholastic athletics & activities ==
Lincolnwood High School sponsors teams named the Lancers that compete as members of the Illinois High School Association (IHSA) and the MSM Conference:

Boys sports

- Baseball
- Basketball
- Golf
- Soccer
- (Football in co-op with Pawnee)

Girls sports

- Cheerleading
- Golf
- Softball
- Volleyball
- (Basketball in co-op with Pawnee)

Activities

- Scholastic Bowl

The baseball team won the 2009 IHSA Class 1A State Championship. Since the school was formed by consolidation in 1962, it has won 8 Regional, 3 Sectional, 1 Super-Sectional, and 1 State title.

The boys basketball team has won 8 Regional championships, and the 1972 team also won the Sectional and Super-Sectional titles en route to a 3rd-place finish in the IHSA Class A State Championships.

The volleyball team has claimed 3 District, 12 Regional, 4 Sectional, and 1 Super-Sectional championships, with the 1985 team advancing to the first round of the IHSA State Championship Tournament.

The boys golf team has won 3 Regional and 2 Sectional championships, and the softball team has claimed 5 Regional titles.
