= Allen Township, Polk County, Iowa =

Township in Polk County, Iowa, United States

Coordinates: 41.5288°N 93.5065°W

Allen Township is a township in Polk County, Iowa, United States.

== History ==
Allen Township was organized in 1848. It is named for Captain James Allen.
