= Raymond, Illinois =

- Village
- Location in Montgomery County, Illinois
- Coordinates: 39°19′11″N 89°34′28″W
- Country: United States
- State: Illinois
- County: Montgomery
- Township: Raymond

Area
  - Total: 1.26 sq mi (3.26 km^{2})
  - Land: 1.26 sq mi (3.26 km^{2})
  - Water: 0 sq mi (0.00 km^{2})
- Elevation: 643 ft (196 m)

Population (2020)
  - Total: 949
  - Density: 754.7/sq mi (291.41/km^{2})
- Time zone: UTC-6 (CST)
  - Summer (DST): UTC-5 (CDT)
- ZIP code: 62560
- Area code: 217
- FIPS code: 17-62965
- GNIS feature ID: 2399049

Raymond is a village in Montgomery County, Illinois, United States. The population was 949 at the 2020 census.

== Geography ==
Raymond is located in northwestern Montgomery County. Illinois Route 48 passes through the village as O'Bannon Street, leading west 3 miles (5 km) to Interstate 55 at Zanesville and northeast 22 miles (35 km) to Taylorville. Illinois Route 127 passes through the west side of the village, going west with IL 48 to Interstate 55 but leading south 12 miles (19 km) to Hillsboro, the Montgomery county seat.

According to the U.S. Census Bureau, Raymond has a total area of 1.26 square miles (3.26 km^{2}), all land. The West Fork of Shoal Creek runs along the western edge of the village, flowing southward to Shoal Creek south of Hillsboro. The village is part of the Kaskaskia River watershed.

== Demographics ==
Historical population
Census	Pop.	Note	%±
1880	543		—
1890	841		54.9%
1900	906		7.7%
1910	881		−2.8%
1920	868		−1.5%
1930	726		−16.4%
1940	818		12.7%
1950	779		−4.8%
1960	871		11.8%
1970	890		2.2%
1980	957		7.5%
1990	820		−14.3%
2000	927		13.0%
2010	1,006		8.5%
2020	949		−5.7%
U.S. Decennial Census

At the 2000 census there were 927 people, 393 households, and 273 families in the village. The population density was 738.6 inhabitants per square mile (285.2/km^{2}). There were 434 housing units at an average density of 345.8 per square mile (133.5/km^{2}). The racial makeup of the village was 99.68% White, 0.11% African American and 0.22% Native American. Hispanic or Latino of any race were 0.22%.

Of the 393 households 29.0% had children under the age of 18 living with them, 59.3% were married couples living together, 7.6% had a female householder with no husband present, and 30.5% were non-families. 26.5% of households were one person and 16.5% were one person aged 65 or older. The average household size was 2.36 and the average family size was 2.85.

The age distribution was 23.8% under the age of 18, 5.9% from 18 to 24, 27.4% from 25 to 44, 20.6% from 45 to 64, and 22.2% 65 or older. The median age was 40 years. For every 100 females, there were 90.3 males. For every 100 females age 18 and over, there were 87.3 males.

The median household income was $37,500 and the median family income was $45,341. Males had a median income of $29,750 versus $22,721 for females. The per capita income for the village was $18,231. About 6.0% of families and 8.4% of the population were below the poverty line, including 8.8% of those under age 18 and 11.1% of those age 65 or over.

== Education ==
Raymond is the base of the Panhandle School District (also known as Panhandle CUSD #2). The district's offices are located on Broad Street and the district's only high school, Lincolnwood Sr. High School (shares building with Lincolnwood Jr. High School), is located on the extreme east end of Prairie Street (although the town is laid out in a slightly irregular fashion, making this street North Prairie Street, despite the fact that it runs east–west).

Raymond also has its own grade school, also located on Prairie Street, serving Pre-K through sixth grade. The communities of Farmersville, Waggoner and Harvel are also part of the Panhandle School District.
