= Avon, Iowa =

- unincorporated community
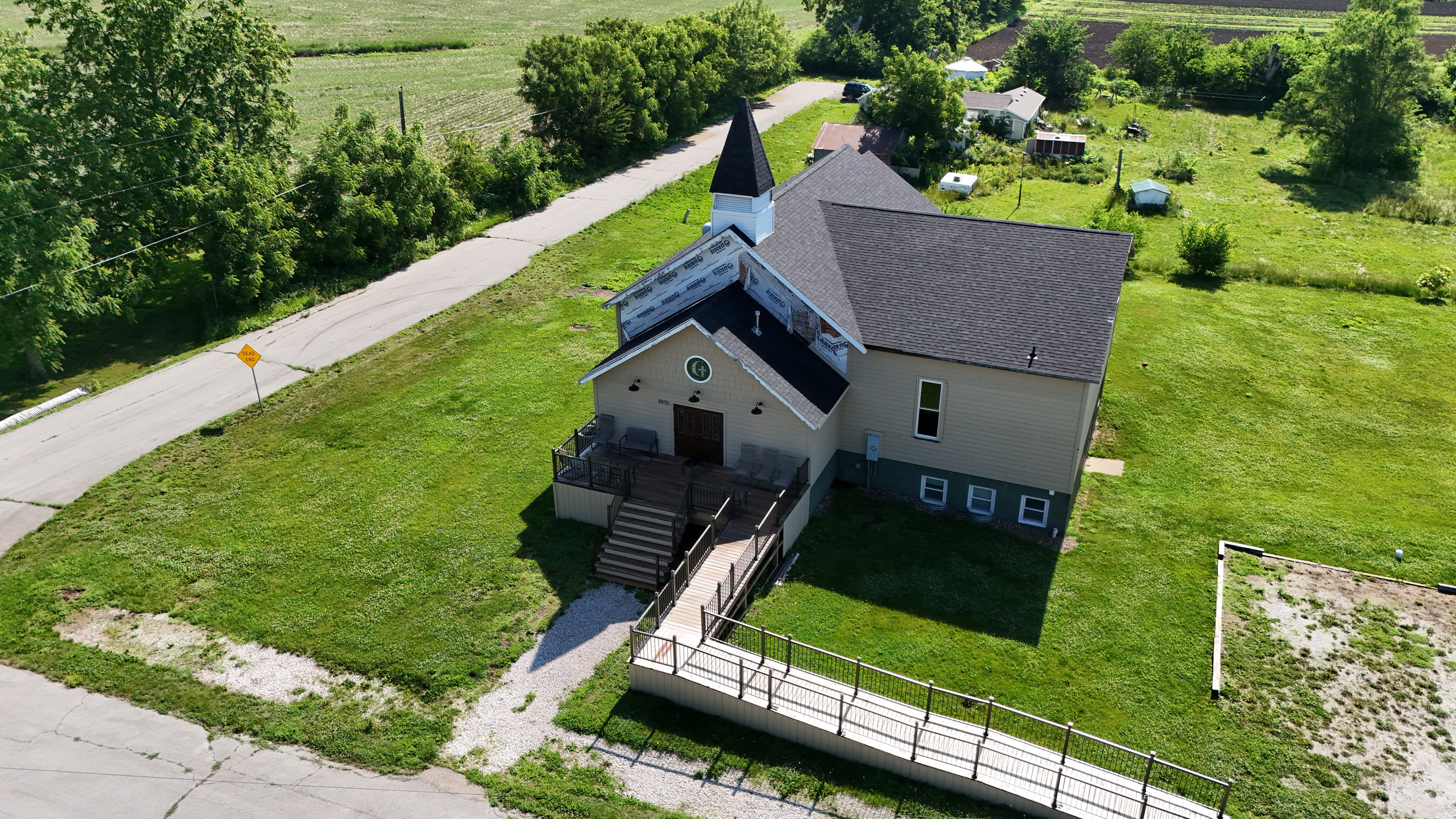
- Glory Baptist Church in Avon

- Location within Iowa Location within the United States
- Coordinates: 41°31′43″N 93°31′24″W
- Country: United States
- State: Iowa
- County: Polk
- Township: Allen
- Elevation: 850 ft (260 m)
- Time zone: UTC-6 (Central (CST))
  - Summer (DST): UTC-5 (CDT)

Avon is an unincorporated community in Polk County, Iowa, United States.

== History ==
The original townsite of Avon was platted by Charles Keeney in either 1855, or 1856. Nearby Avon Lake, one mile southeast, was founded when the railroad bypassed Avon. The first schoolhouse in the area was built in 1856.

At Avon's founding, it was the only village in Allen Township, and enjoyed several early years of prosperity. It had a large hotel, a United Bretheren church, several stores, and more than 20 houses. The Avon post office began operations in 1857.

Avon's population was 6 in 1900, 11 in 1925, and 18 in 1925.

The Avon post office closed in 1927.

Avon's population was 22 in 1940.

Avon's cemetery was previously known as Watts Cemetery.

On March 5, 2022, an EF4 tornado struck the town (albeit at a slightly weaker strength), damaging multiple homes and facilities.

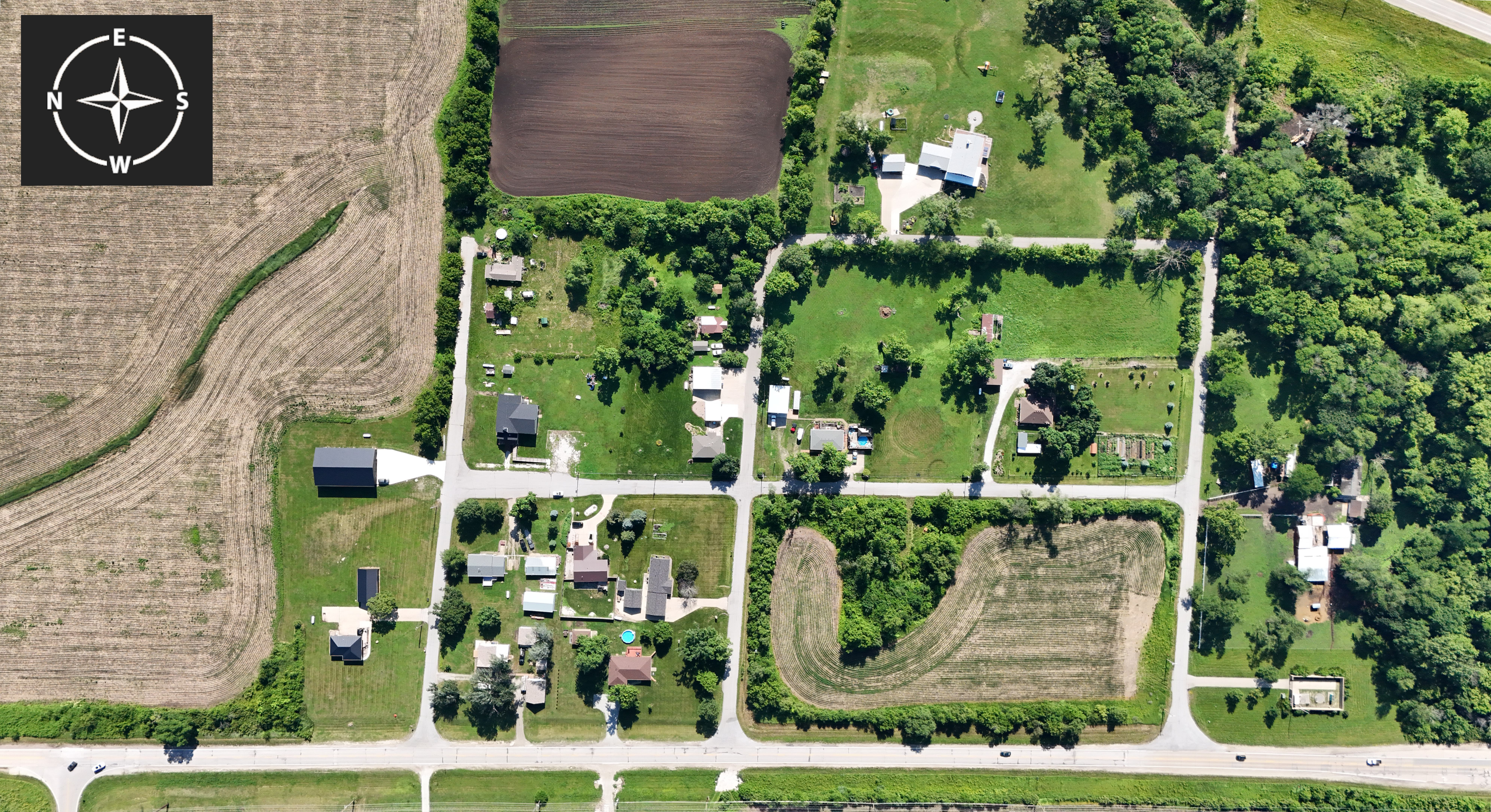
An aerial view of Avon taken on June 19, 2025
