= Macksburg, Iowa =

- City
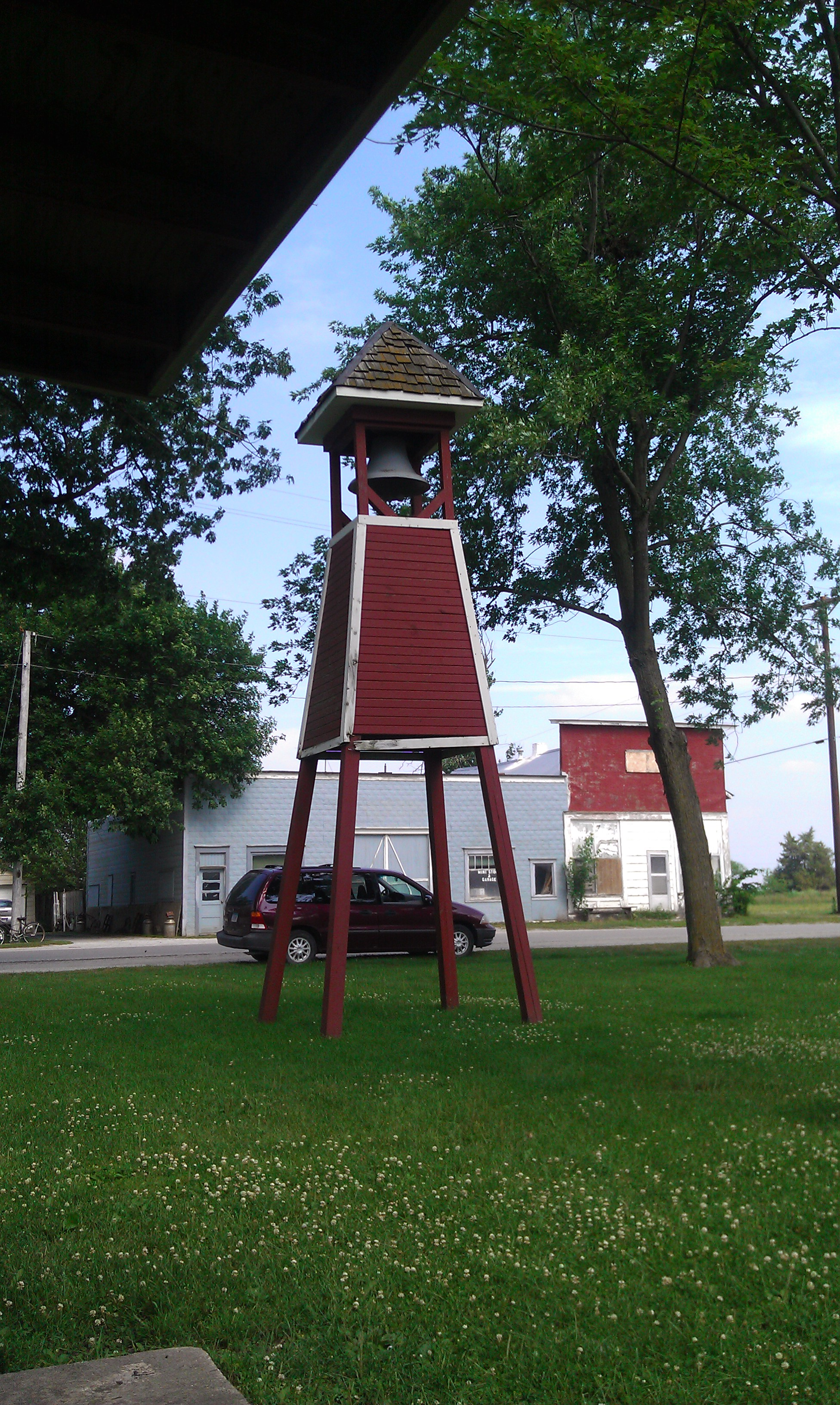
- Fire Bell in the city park

- Location of Macksburg, Iowa
- Coordinates: 41°12′53″N 94°11′06″W
- Country: USA
- State: Iowa
- County: Madison

Area
  - Total: 1.98 sq mi (5.14 km^{2})
  - Land: 1.98 sq mi (5.14 km^{2})
  - Water: 0 sq mi (0.00 km^{2})
- Elevation: 1,263 ft (385 m)

Population (2020)
  - Total: 97
  - Density: 48.9/sq mi (18.88/km^{2})
- Time zone: UTC-6 (Central (CST))
  - Summer (DST): UTC-5 (CDT)
- ZIP code: 50155
- Area code: 641
- FIPS code: 19-48180
- GNIS feature ID: 2395799

Macksburg is a city in Madison County, Iowa, United States. The population was 97 at the time of the 2020 census. It is part of the Des Moines–West Des Moines Metropolitan Statistical Area.

== Geography ==
According to the United States Census Bureau, the city has a total area of 1.99 square miles (5.15 km^{2}), all of it land.

== History ==
Macksburg was laid out and platted in 1873. It was named for Dr. Joseph Hughes Mack, one of the original owners of the town site.

== Demographics ==
Historical populations
Year	Pop.	±%
1880	204	—
1890	186	−8.8%
1900	235	+26.3%
1910	197	−16.2%
1920	228	+15.7%
1930	218	−4.4%
1940	255	+17.0%
1950	220	−13.7%
1960	174	−20.9%
1970	142	−18.4%
1980	132	−7.0%
1990	110	−16.7%
2000	142	+29.1%
2010	113	−20.4%
2020	97	−14.2%
Source:"U.S. Census website". United States Census Bureau. and Iowa Data Center; Source: U.S. Decennial Census

=== 2020 census ===
As of the census of 2020, there were 97 people, 45 households, and 26 families residing in the city. The population density was 48.9 inhabitants per square mile (18.9/km^{2}). There were 54 housing units at an average density of 27.2 per square mile (10.5/km^{2}). The racial makeup of the city was 94.8% White, 0.0% Black or African American, 0.0% Native American, 0.0% Asian, 0.0% Pacific Islander, 0.0% from other races and 5.2% from two or more races. Hispanic or Latino persons of any race comprised 0.0% of the population.

Of the 45 households, 26.7% of which had children under the age of 18 living with them, 42.2% were married couples living together, 8.9% were cohabitating couples, 22.2% had a female householder with no spouse or partner present and 26.7% had a male householder with no spouse or partner present. 42.2% of all households were non-families. 37.8% of all households were made up of individuals, 15.6% had someone living alone who was 65 years old or older.

The median age in the city was 48.5 years. 22.7% of the residents were under the age of 20; 6.2% were between the ages of 20 and 24; 14.4% were from 25 and 44; 32.0% were from 45 and 64; and 24.7% were 65 years of age or older. The gender makeup of the city was 45.4% male and 54.6% female.

=== 2010 census ===
At the 2010 census there were 113 people in 53 households, including 33 families, in the city. The population density was 56.8 inhabitants per square mile (21.9/km^{2}). There were 59 housing units at an average density of 29.6 per square mile (11.4/km^{2}). The racial makup of the city was 96.5% White, 1.8% Native American, and 1.8% from two or more races.

Of the 53 households 28.3% had children under the age of 18 living with them, 47.2% were married couples living together, 9.4% had a female householder with no husband present, 5.7% had a male householder with no wife present, and 37.7% were non-families. 34.0% of households were one person and 11.3% were one person aged 65 or older. The average household size was 2.13 and the average family size was 2.76.

The median age was 44.4 years. 20.4% of residents were under the age of 18; 6.1% were between the ages of 18 and 24; 25.7% were from 25 to 44; 27.4% were from 45 to 64; and 20.4% were 65 or older. The gender makeup of the city was 52.2% male and 47.8% female.

=== 2000 census ===
At the 2000 census there were 142 people in 62 households, including 40 families, in the city. The population density was 72.0 inhabitants per square mile (27.8/km^{2}). There were 66 housing units at an average density of 33.4 per square mile (12.9/km^{2}). The racial makup of the city was 97.18% White, 1.41% Asian, and 1.41% from two or more races.

Of the 62 households 29.0% had children under the age of 18 living with them, 58.1% were married couples living together, 4.8% had a female householder with no husband present, and 33.9% were non-families. 32.3% of households were one person and 14.5% were one person aged 65 or older. The average household size was 2.29 and the average family size was 2.76.

The age distribution was 26.8% under the age of 18, 6.3% from 18 to 24, 20.4% from 25 to 44, 28.2% from 45 to 64, and 18.3% 65 or older. The median age was 38 years. For every 100 females, there were 89.3 males. For every 100 females age 18 and over, there were 96.2 males.

The median household income was $31,500 and the median family income was $36,964. Males had a median income of $29,688 versus $20,357 for females. The per capita income for the city was $14,080. There were none of the families and 5.6% of the population living below the poverty line, including no under eighteens and 6.5% of those over 64.

== Education ==
Orient-Macksburg Community School District previously operated area public schools. The district closed its own schools and began sending students to Nodaway Valley Community School District schools in 2025, and it dissolved completely effective July 1, 2026.

== Notable people ==
- Glenn L. Martin, American aviator and founder of the Glenn L. Martin Company, which is now part of the Lockheed Martin Corporation.

== Gallery ==
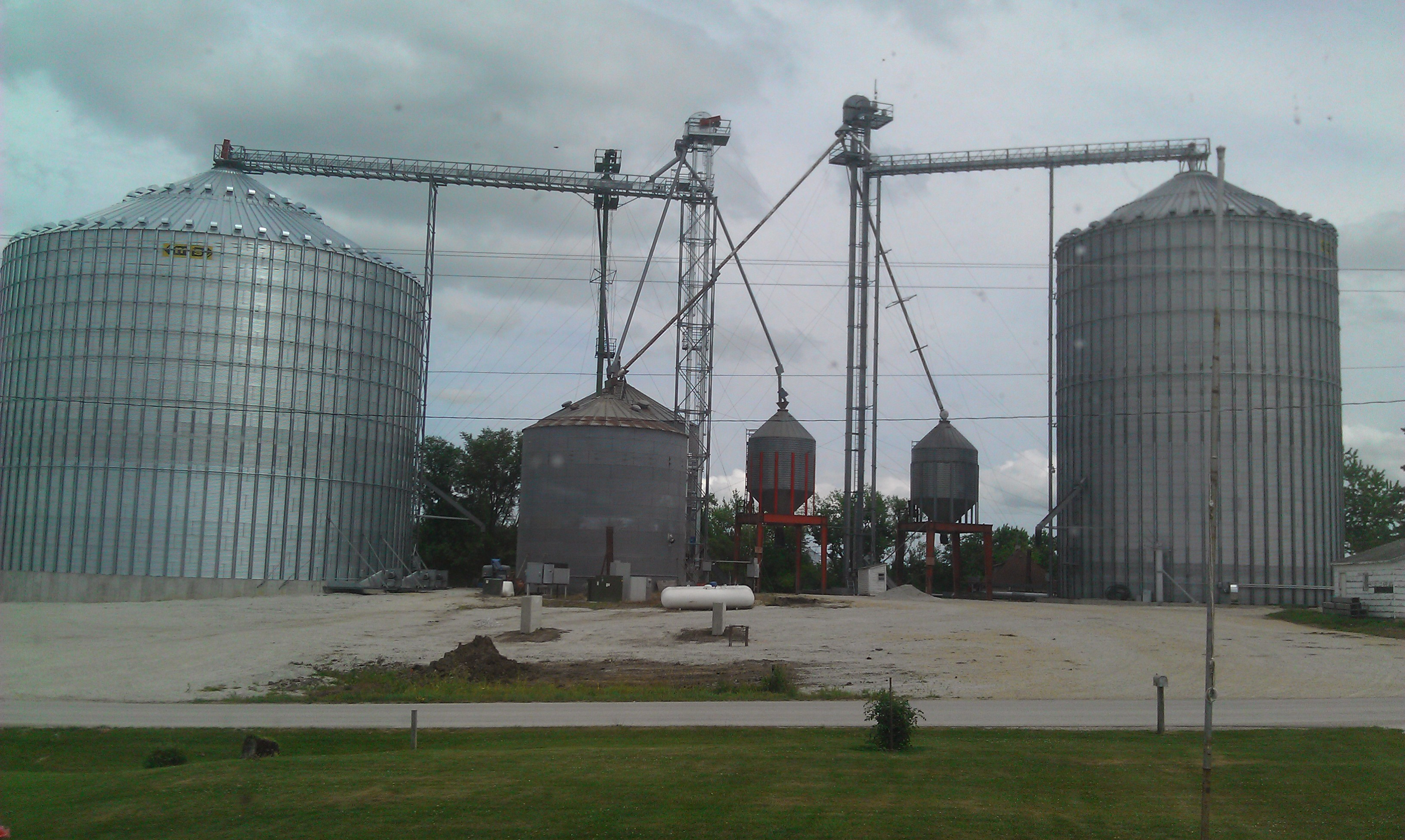
Farmer's Coop Grain elevators

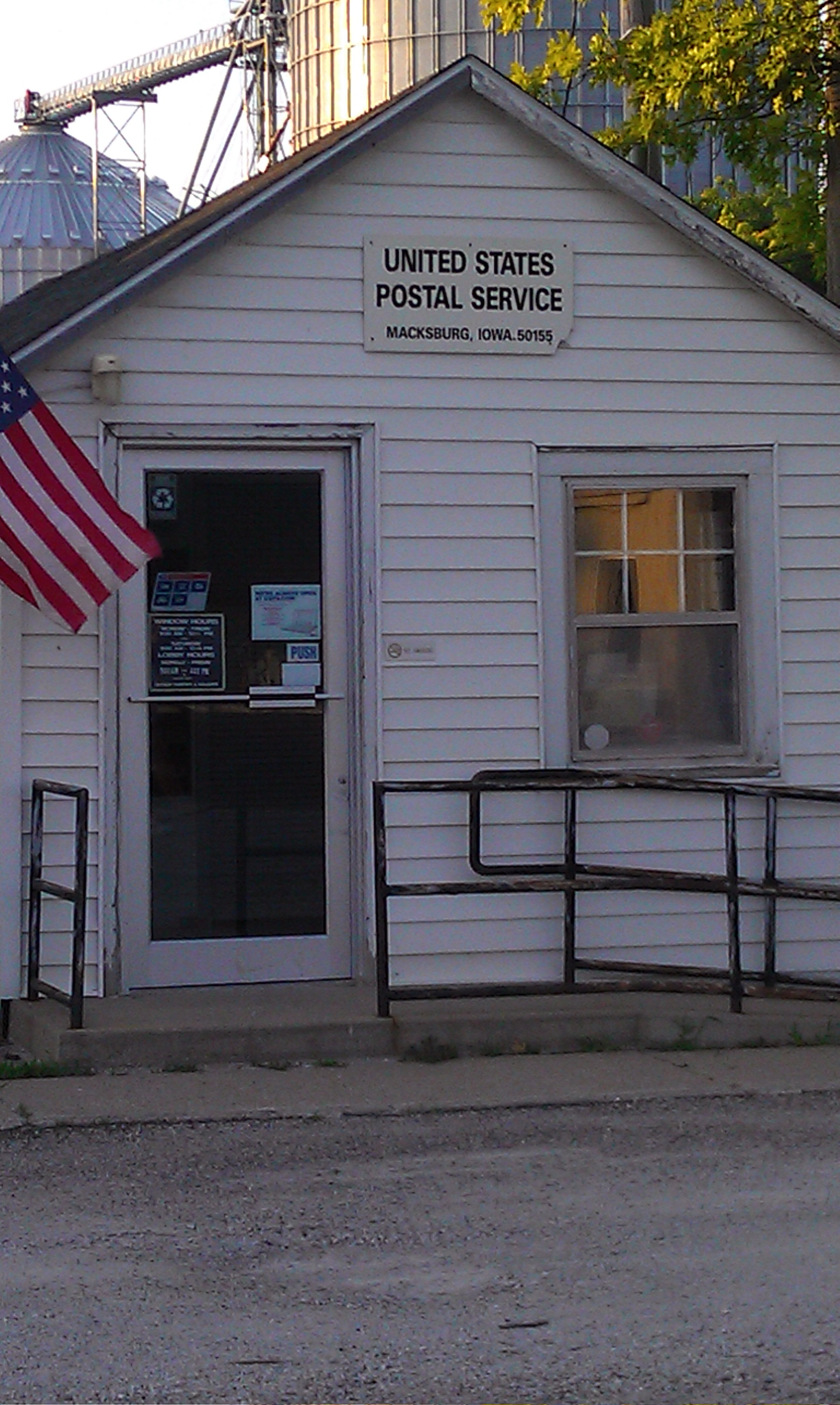
Post Office

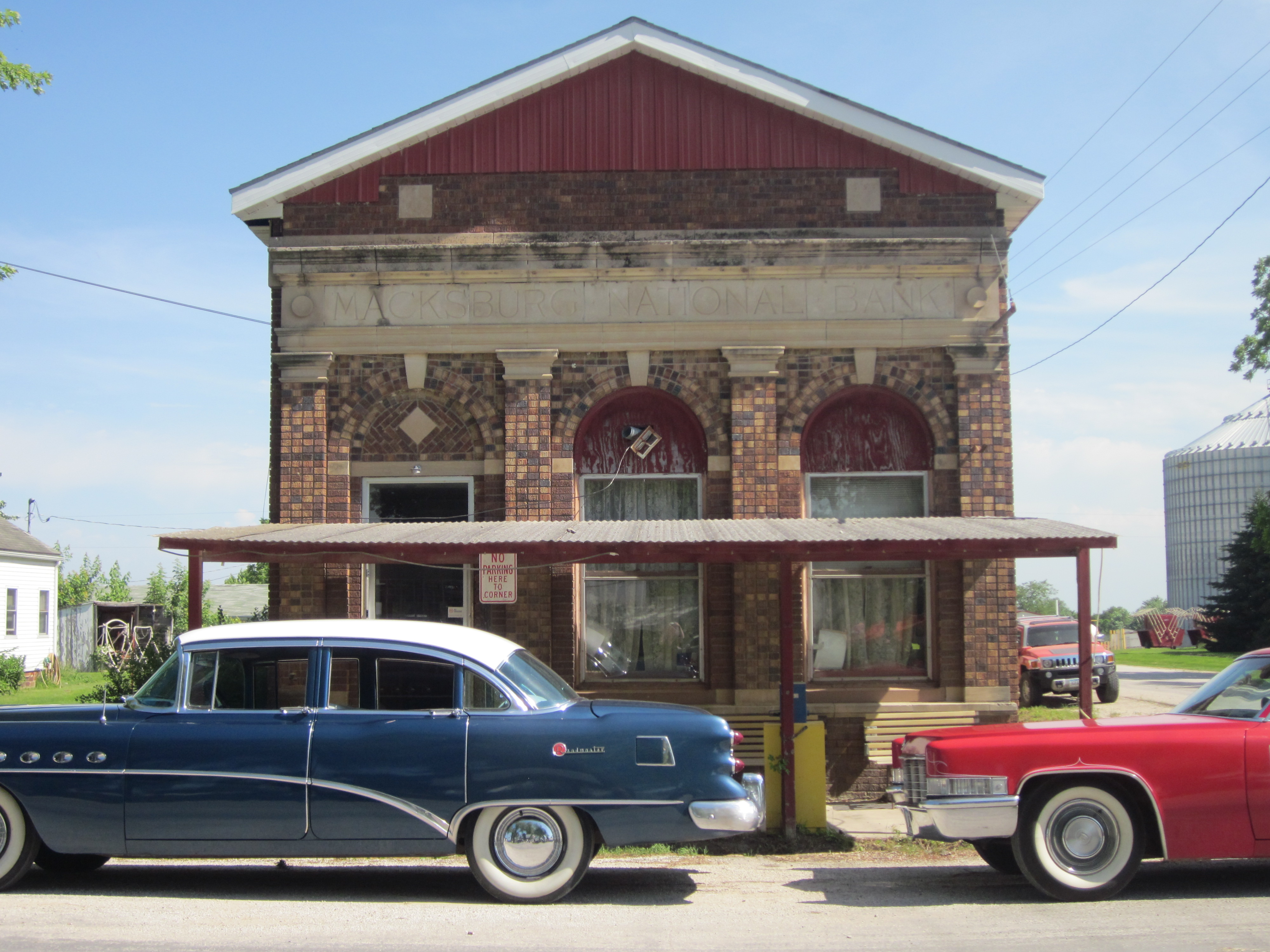
Old City Hall

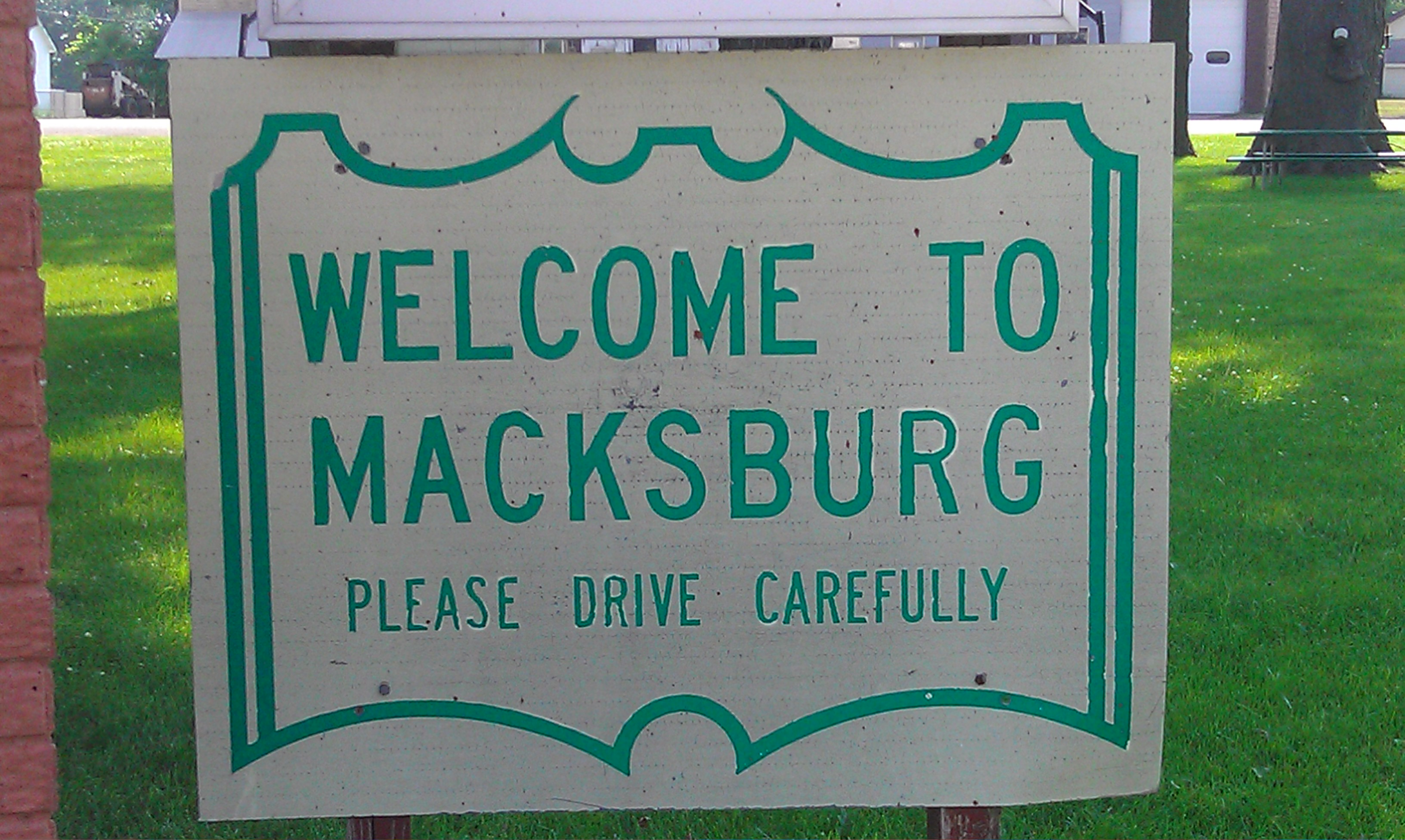
Welcome sign in city park

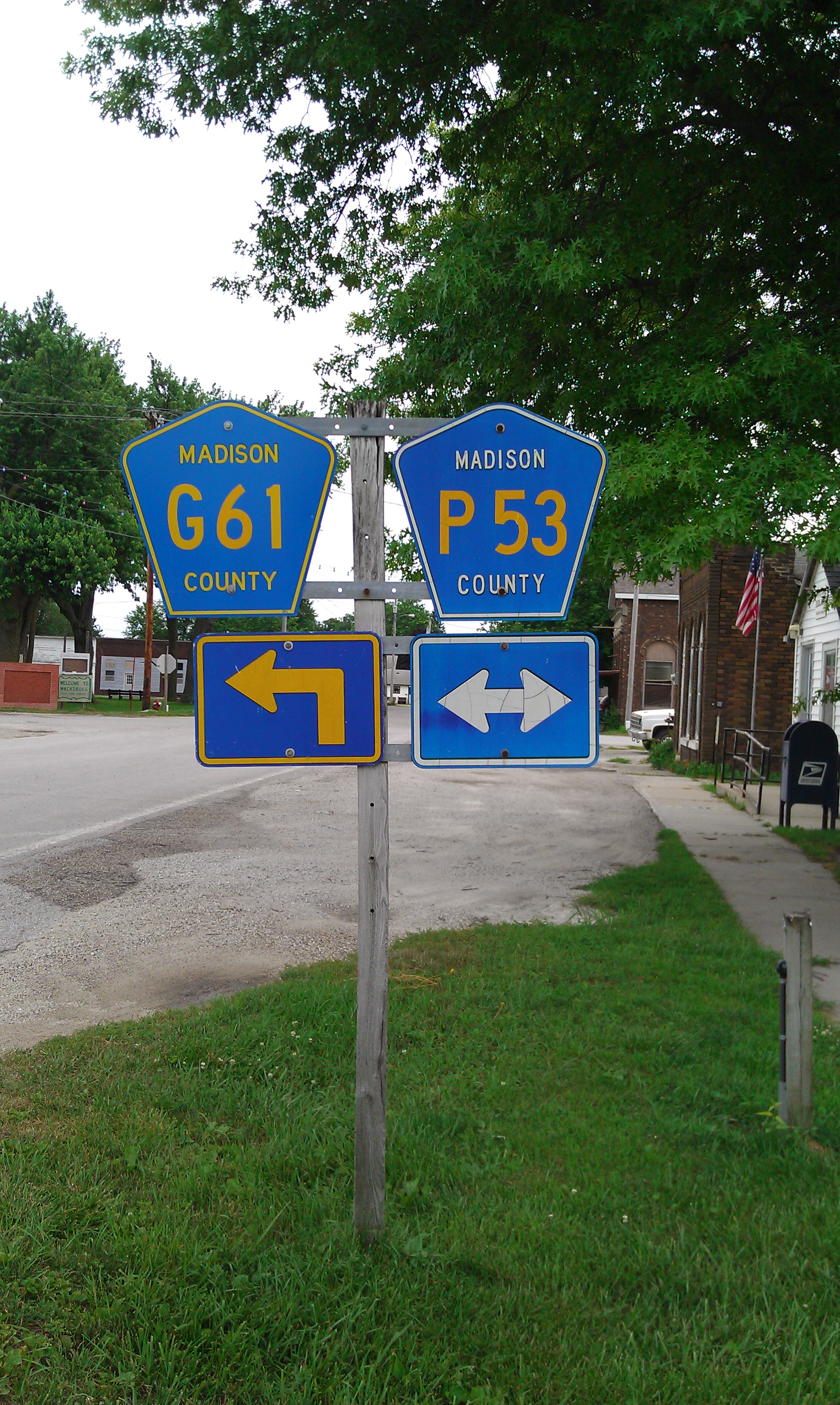
Highway signs
