= Beecher Mausoleum =

Historic site in Will County, Illinois

- U.S. National Register of Historic Places
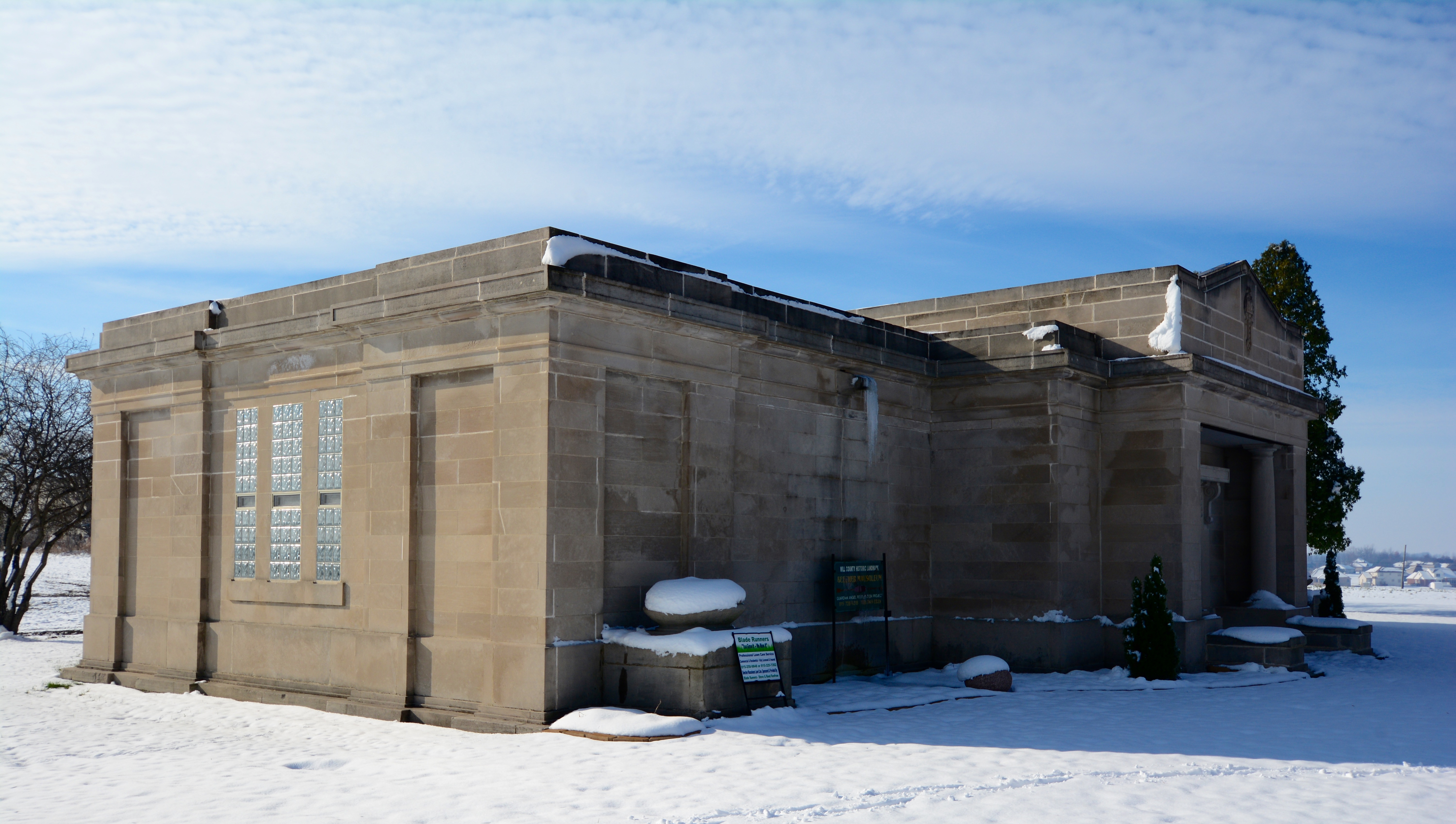

- Location within Illinois Location within the United States
- Location: Jct. of IL 1 & Horner Ln., Washington Township, Illinois
- Coordinates: 41°20′13″N 87°37′08″W
- Built: 1913-14
- Architect: Cecil E. Bryan
- Architectural style: Neoclassical
- NRHP reference No.: 13000714
- Added to NRHP: September 18, 2013

The Beecher Mausoleum is a community mausoleum located at the junction of Illinois Route 1 and Horner Lane in Washington Township, Will County, Illinois, southeast of the village of Beecher. The mausoleum was built in 1913–14, making it an early example of a community mausoleum. The first community mausoleum in the United States was built in 1907, and changing burial traditions and successful marketing made them a popular method of burial through the 1930s. These mausoleums were most common in large cities, and the Beecher Mausoleum is a rare early example of a community mausoleum in a small, rural village. Architect Cecil E. Bryan, who designed many community mausoleums for the International Mausoleum Company, designed the mausoleum in the Neoclassical style.

The mausoleum was added to the National Register of Historic Places on September 18, 2013.
