= William T. Wood =

U.S. Army brigadier general

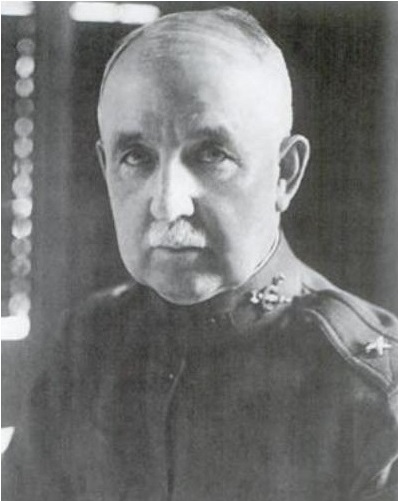
- Wood as a brigadier general in 1918
- Born: June 19, 1854; Irving, Illinois, U.S.
- Died: December 18, 1943 (aged 89); Washington, D.C., U.S.
- Burial place: Arlington National Cemetery
- Alma mater: United States Military Academy
- Spouse: Janet Judson Sandford (m. 1877–1943)
- Children: 2
- Military career
- Service: United States Army
- Service years: 1877–1913; 1917–1920
- Rank: Brigadier General
- Service number: 0-13251
- Units: U.S. Army Infantry Branch; Office of the Inspector General of the United States Army
- Commands: Fort Wayne, Michigan; 19th Infantry Regiment; U.S. Army Recruiting Depot, Jefferson Barracks; Inspector General of the United States Army (acting)
- Wars: Spanish–American War; Philippine–American War; World War I
- Awards: Army Distinguished Service Medal; Silver Star; Purple Heart
- Other work: Treasurer and Secretary to the Board of Governors, U. S. Soldiers' Home

William T. Wood (June 19, 1854 – December 18, 1943) was a career officer in the United States Army. An 1877 graduate of the United States Military Academy at West Point, he served from 1877 to 1913 and again from 1917 to 1920. Wood was a veteran of the Spanish–American War, Philippine–American War, and World War I, and attained the rank of brigadier general. He was the longtime chief assistant to the Inspector General of the United States Army, and was a recipient of the Army Distinguished Service Medal, the Silver Star, and the Purple Heart.

== Early life ==
William Thomas Wood was born in Irving, Illinois on June 19, 1854, the son of clergyman Preston Wood, a Union Army veteran of the American Civil War, and Jane Keziah (Christian) Wood. He was raised and educated in Danville, Illinois, and became a clerk at the Danville First National Bank. In 1873, he was appointed to the United States Military Academy (West Point). Wood graduated in 1877 ranked 7th of 76, and received his commission as a second lieutenant of Infantry.

== Start of career ==
After receiving his commission, Wood was assigned to the 18th Infantry Regiment at Fort McPherson, Georgia, where he remained until April 12, 1879. From April 1879 to March 1880 he was posted to Fort Assinniboine, Montana. Wood was then assigned as professor of military science and tactics at Illinois Industrial University, where he remained until July 1883. He then returned to frontier duty at Fort Assinniboine, where he served until May 1885. Wood served at Fort Leavenworth, Kansas from May 1885 to November 1886, and he was promoted to first lieutenant in October 1886.

From November 1886 to July 1887, Wood served at Fort Riley, Kansas. In June 1887 he was assigned as the regimental quartermaster, and he performed this duty until December 1888. Wood was posted to Fort Hays, Kansas until January 1889, Fort Gibson, Oklahoma until October 1889, and Fort Clark, Texas until October 1893. From June 1890 to December 1892, Wood served again as the 18th Infantry's quartermaster officer. He was posted to Fort Bliss, Texas from October 1893 to September 1895, and he was promoted to captain in June 1894. Wood performed recruiting duty in Pittsburgh, Pennsylvania from October to November 1895, and in Louisville, Kentucky from November 1895 to October 1897. He served on garrison duty at Fort Sam Houston, Texas from October 1897 to April 1898, and in Mobile, Alabama until May 1898.

== Continued career ==
In May 1898, Wood departed for Spanish–American War duty in the Philippines and he arrived in June. He took part in the August 1898 Battle of Manila, and remained in Manila as chief ordnance officer for the Department of the Pacific and the Eighth Army Corps. For his participation in the Battle of Manila, Wood received the Silver Star and Purple Heart.

In March 1899, he was assigned to the province of Cebu, where he performed Philippine–American War duty as collector of customs and assistant U. S. treasurer until November 1899. From November 1899 to April 1900, Wood was treasurer of the Philippines and Guam. After returning to the United States, he performed recruiting duty in Chicago until April 1902. He was promoted to major in the 30th Infantry in February 1901, and transferred to the 20th Infantry in September 1901.

Wood was assigned to garrison duty at Fort Sheridan, Illinois from April 1902 to February 1903. From February to June 1903, he was assigned to command the post at Fort Wayne, Michigan. From June to November 1903, he was again assigned to garrison duty at Fort Sheridan. In November 1903, Wood was detailed to the Inspector General's Department and assigned as inspector general of the Department of California. In January 1904, he was appointed assistant to the inspector general of the army's Atlantic Division. From July 1905 until February 1906, he served as assistant to the inspector general of the Philippine Division. He was promoted to lieutenant colonel in February 1906.

From March 1906 to July 1906, Wood was assigned as acting inspector general of the Philippine Division, and he was the division's inspector general from July 1906 to August 1907. During his time in the Philippines, Wood uncovered widespread corruption, including supply depot commanders who directed their woodworking shops to construct furniture, luggage, and other items for personal use or to give as gifts. In addition, Wood uncovered dock owners charging the army exorbitant rent and diverting part of the payments to the personal bank accounts of the commanders who authorized the dock leases. He also found that some depot commanders and other army officials were selling allegedly surplus government property and keeping the proceeds for themselves. As a result of his inquiry, several individuals were required to reimburse the army, six successive Philippines depot commanders were court-martialed, and one, John Clem was reassigned to a less visible position in the United States.

After returning to the United States, Wood was again appointed assistant to the army's Inspector General, and he served until July 1909. He was the inspector general of the army's Department of the East from July 1909 until March 1910. He was promoted to colonel in March 1910 and assigned to command the 19th Infantry in the Philippines. In September 1911, he was assigned to command the U.S. Army Recruiting Depot at Jefferson Barracks, Missouri. In April 1913, Wood retired for disability.

== Later career ==
Wood resided in Washington, D.C. after he retired, and was appointed treasurer of the U. S. Soldiers' Home, where he served from October 1913 to May 1917. On May 24, 1917, he was returned to active duty as assistant to the army's Inspector General. He served throughout the war, and was promoted to temporary brigadier general in February 1918. Wood served as acting inspector general on several occasions when incumbents Ernest Albert Garlington and John Loomis Chamberlain were absent, and he remained on active duty after reaching the mandatory retirement age of 64 in June 1918.

During his wartime service, an investigation by Wood determined that Robert Andrews Millikan, a prominent scientist who held an army commission during the war, had attempted to steal another inventor's design for a centrifugal gun in order to profit personally. Wood recommended termination of Millikan's army commission, but a subsequent investigation by Frank McIntyre, the executive assistant to the army chief of staff, exonerated Millikan. Wood continued to serve until retiring as a colonel in September 1920. He was a recipient of the Army Distinguished Service Medal to recognize his wartime service.

After retiring for the second time, Wood served as secretary to the board of governors at the Soldier's Home. In 1930, the U.S. Congress passed legislation allowing the generals of World War I to retire at their highest rank, and Wood was promoted to brigadier general on the retired list. Wood died in Washington, D.C., on December 18, 1943. He was buried at Arlington National Cemetery.

== Family ==
In 1877, Wood married Janet Judson Sandford, and they remained married until her death in May 1943. They were the parents of two children; son Thomas S. Wood and daughter Janet W. Wood. Thomas S. Wood was born and died in January 1879. Janet W. Wood was the wife of Brigadier General Henry Church Pillsbury.
