= John A. Graham =

American politician and businessman

John Graham

Member of the Illinois Senate
- In office 1958–1979

Personal details
- Born: December 3, 1911 Irving, Illinois, U.S.
- Died: December 3, 1979 (aged 68) Barrington, Illinois, U.S.

Military service
- Branch/service: United States Army
- Battles/wars: World War II

John A. Graham (December 3, 1911 – December 3, 1979) was an American politician and businessman who served as a member of the Illinois Senate from 1958 to 1979.

== Early life and education ==
Graham was born on a farm near Irving, Illinois and attended local public schools. He graduated from Fillmore High School in 1928. He later attended business and technical schools.

== Career ==
Graham began his career as an accountant. He served in the United States Army Air Forces during World War II and was commissioned a sergeant. Graham, his wife, and family lived in Barrington, Illinois where he owned an appliance business. Graham served in the Illinois Senate from 1958 until his death in 1979 and was a Republican.

== Personal life ==
Graham died in Barrington, Illinois at his home.
