= Pasadena Republican Club =

Republican club in Pasadena, California

- Greater Pasadena Area
- Abbreviation: PRC
- Formation: 29 March 1884
- Founder: Colonel Jabez Banbury
- Founded at: Pasadena, California
- Headquarters: Pasadena, California
- Board of directors: Volunteers for 3 year term
- Affiliations: Republican Party of Los Angeles County and California Republican Party
- Website: http://www.pasadenarepublicanclub.com

Pasadena Republican Club (PRC) is the oldest, continuously active Republican political club in America, founded on March 29, 1884, 142 years ago. Every two years for the last 142 years the Pasadena Republican Club has operated the Greater Pasadena Area Republican Headquarters in Pasadena, California with the help of volunteers. Greater Pasadena Area Republican Headquarters supports the towns in the west side of the San Gabriel Valley. Pasadena Republican Club works closely with Republicans running for office of the California's 41st State Assembly district.

The Pasadena Republican Club helps Republican candidates get elected to federal, state, and local office. Pasadena Republican Club is funded by membership donations and general donations.

Pasadena Republican Club also hosts forums during the year on many different subject, promoting educational programs of interest to the general public. Past speakers have included: First Lady Laura Bush, Secretary of State of California Bruce McPherson, Los Angeles County District Attorney Steve Cooley and Los Angeles County Board of Supervisors Michael D. Antonovich and more. The Pasadena Republican Club has a volunteer board of directors that make quarterly newsletters, voter guides and invitations to local events.

== History ==
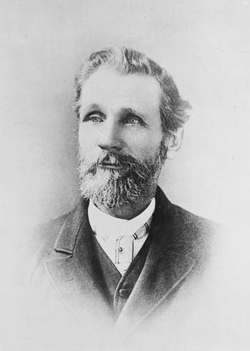
Colonel Jabez Banbury

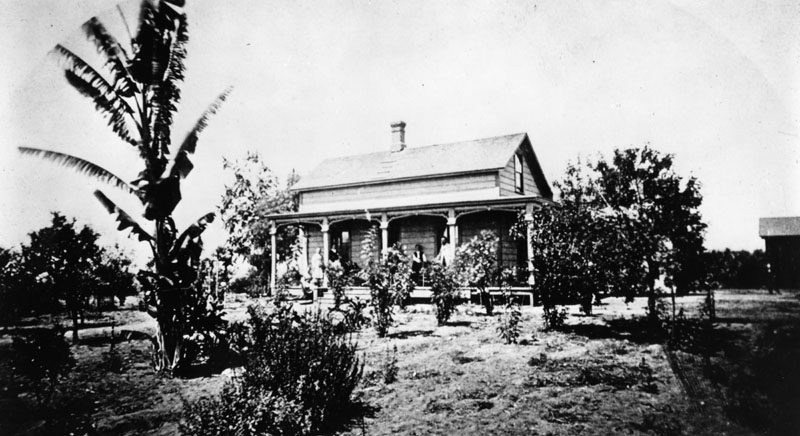
Colonel J. Banbury home on South Orange Grove Avenue, which he built in 1874. This was the second home built in Pasadena

Pasadena Republican Club was started on March 29, 1884, ten years after the founding of Pasadena, colonel Jabez Banbury was the first president of the Club. Banbury was one of the early settlers and founders of Pasadena and a veteran of the Civil War from 5th Iowa Volunteer Infantry Regiment. After the war, with Thomas Croft, Banbury purchased a large lot of land in Pasadena on Orange Grove Ave between Colorado Boulevard and California Street. The two became the first students to attended Pasadena's first school on Orange Grove. The second home built in Pasadena was Colonel J. Banbury's ranch home on South Orange Grove Avenue, near the current Tournament of Roses' Wrigley Mansion.

In 1884 Ben E. Ward was the club secretary. Ward published Pasadena's first newspaper, The Chronicle. Banbury, Ward, and H. W. Magee went on to be delegates to a Los Angeles Republican convention that voted on delegates to the Republican State convention, for the selection of the Republican candidate for US Congress Sixth District. On July 23, 1884 Henry Markham was nominated by the sixth district Republican caucus. Markham was a member of the U.S. House of Representatives from 1885 to 1887. He declined to be a candidate for re-nomination in 1886. During his campaign for Governor, Markham was referred to as "the dashing colonel from Pasadena." Markham won his race for Governor and was the 18th governor of California from January 8, 1891 until January 11, 1895. Markham was a member of the Pasadena Republican Club. He died in Pasadena on October 9, 1923. From 1896 to 1906, the Pasadena Republican Club has a subdivision called The American Club, this club was a marching band, of flags and musical instruments. Very active at holiday times and Presidential election times. In 1894 Pasadena Republican Club member, James McLachlan was elected as a Republican to the United States House, defeating Democrat George S. Patton, Sr. He served in the Fifty-fourth Congress (March 4, 1895 – March 3, 1897). John Carl Hinshaw, a club member, was elected as a Republican to the Seventy-sixth and to the eight succeeding Congresses and served from January 3, 1939 until his death in 1956. In the 1950s and 1960s the Pasadena Republican Club sponsored a Young Republicans chapter.

In 1909 the Pasadena Republican Club celebrated its 25th anniversary, the guest speaker was George Russell Davis. Davis served as president of the Pasadena Republican Club and a member Republican County Executive Committee of Los Angeles county before his appointment to the Superior Court of Los Angeles County in 1909. In 1934 the Pasadena Republican Club celebrated its 50th anniversary with a dinner, the guest speaker was Congressman William E. Evans. In March 1984 the Pasadena Republican Club celebrated its 100th anniversary with a grand dinner at the Huntington Sheraton Hotel, some of the guest speakers were Carlos Moorhead and Dick Mountjoy. In 2009 the Pasadena Republican Club celebrated its 125th anniversary and opened the Greater Pasadena Area Republican Headquarters on North Lake Ave.

== See also ==
- California State Assembly
- California State Assembly districts
- Districts in California
- Republican National Committee
- National Republican Senatorial Committee
- National Republican Congressional Committee
- Bruce V. Reagan

== Photo gallery ==
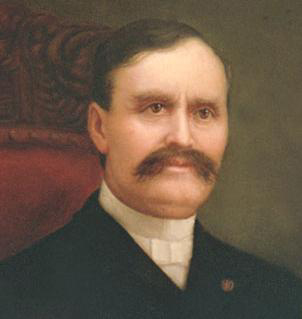
Henry Markham, Pasadena Republican Club member and Governor of California

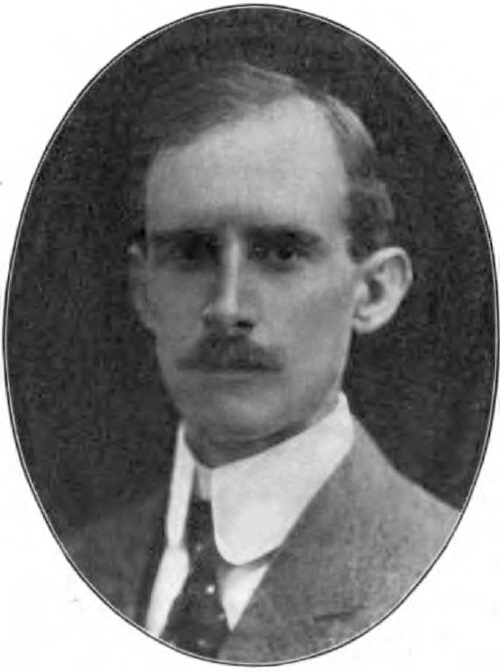
Judge George Russell Davis Pasadena Republican Club President in 1909.

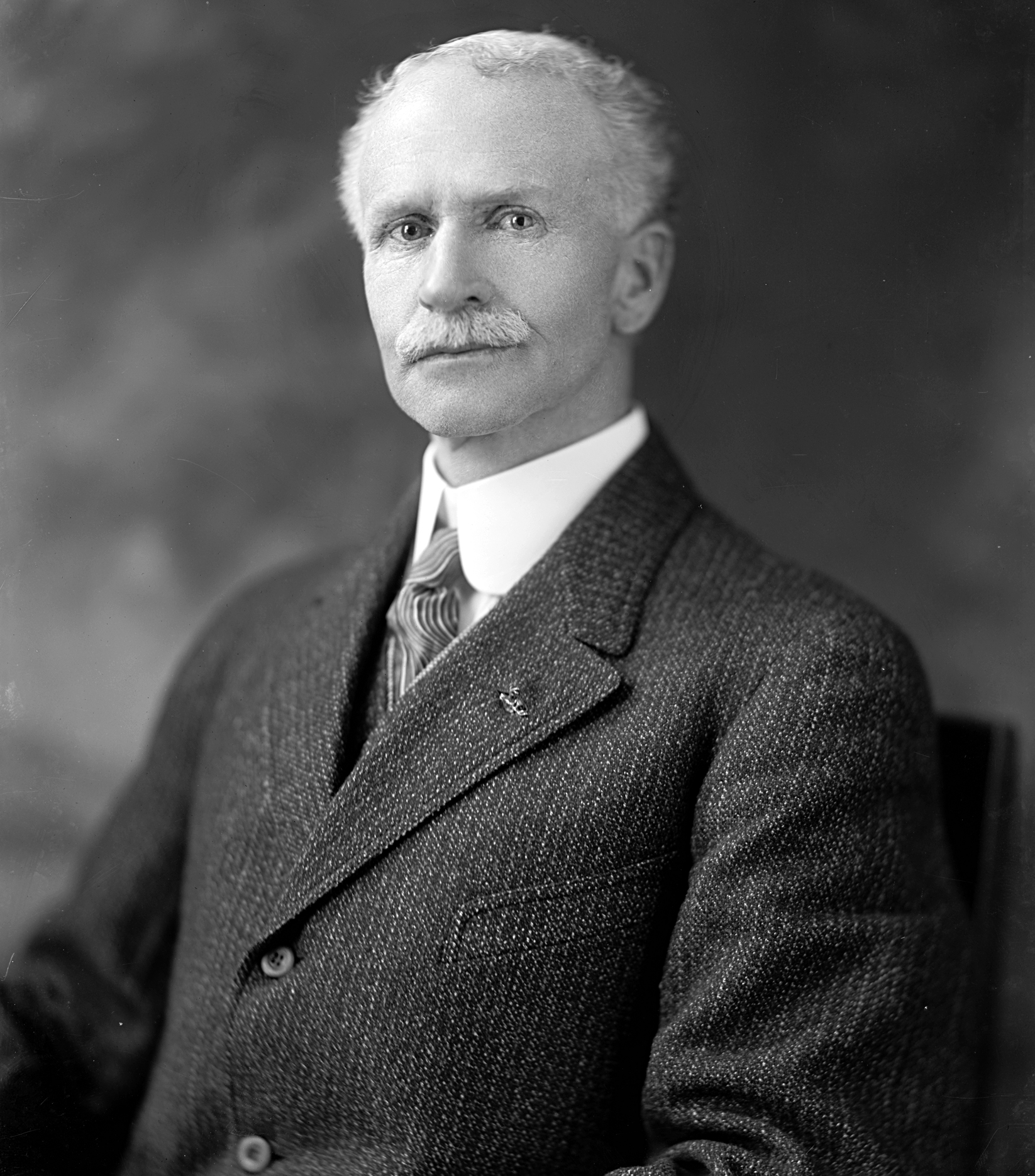
Charles W. Bell Pasadena Republican Club member and a U.S. Representative from California

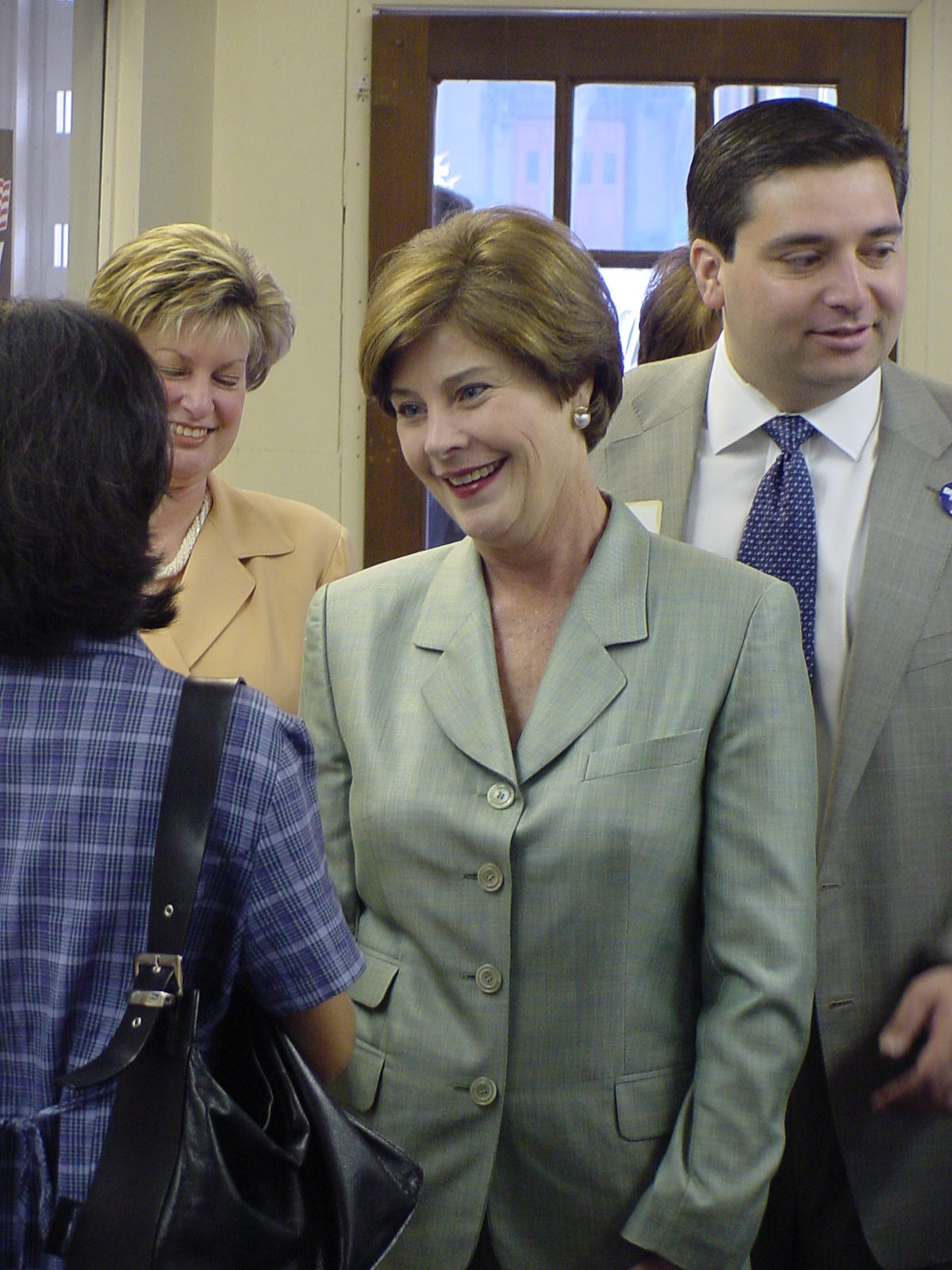
Laura Bush appears to campaign on behalf of her husband in 2000

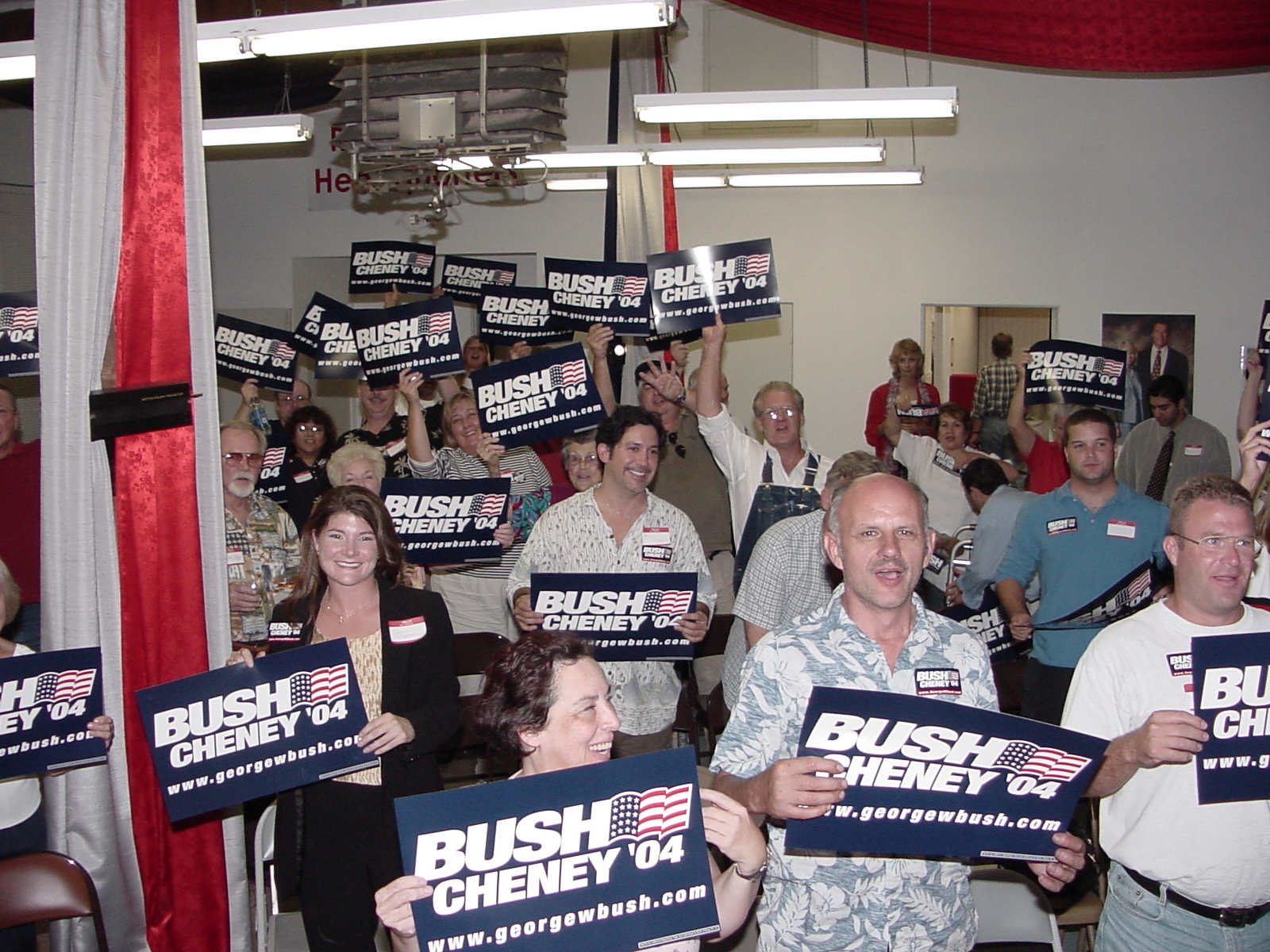
Members attend a watch party of the broadcast of George W. Bush's acceptance speech at the 2004 Republican National Convention

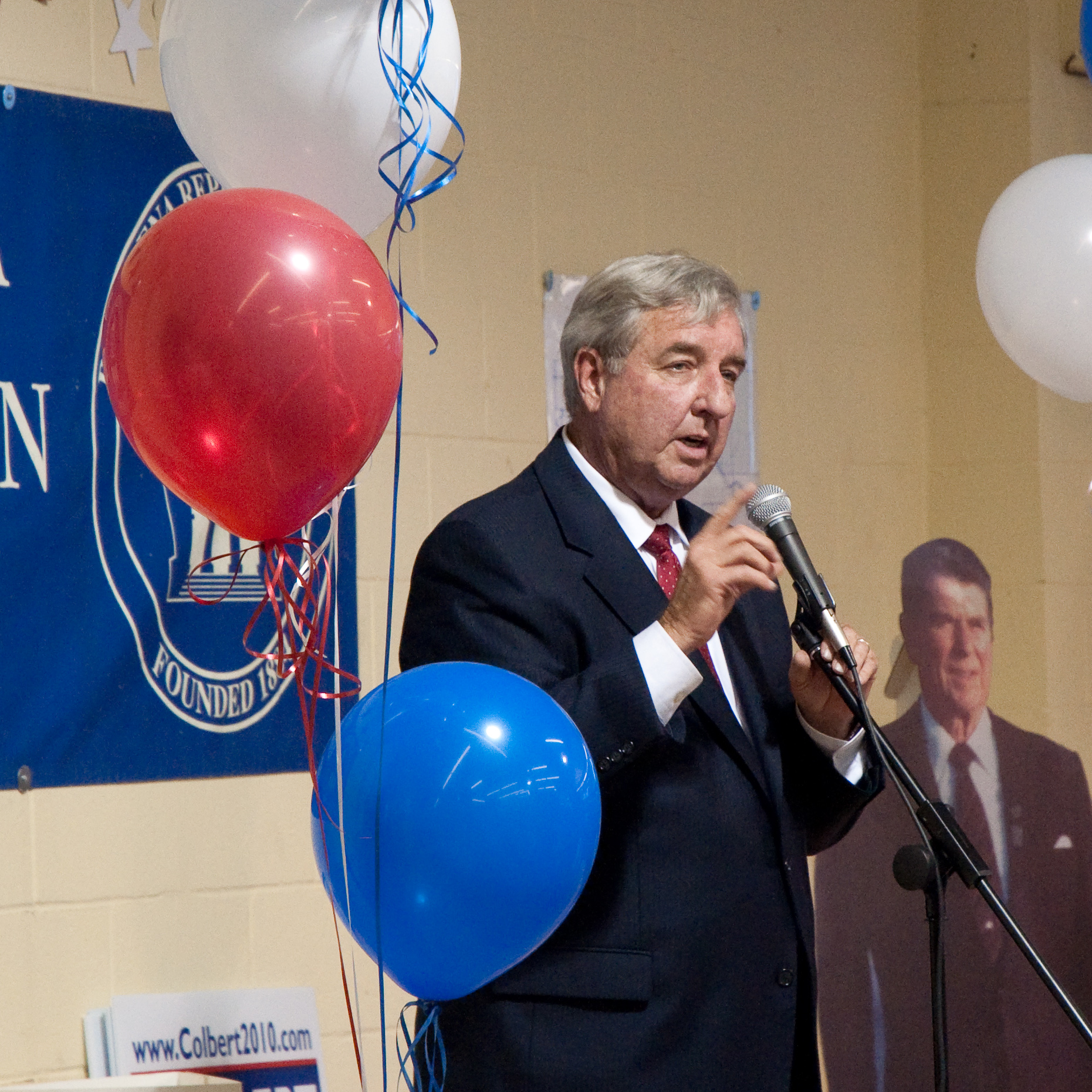
Steve Cooley at the Grand Opening party for the Pasadena Republican Club's 2010 Election Headquarters

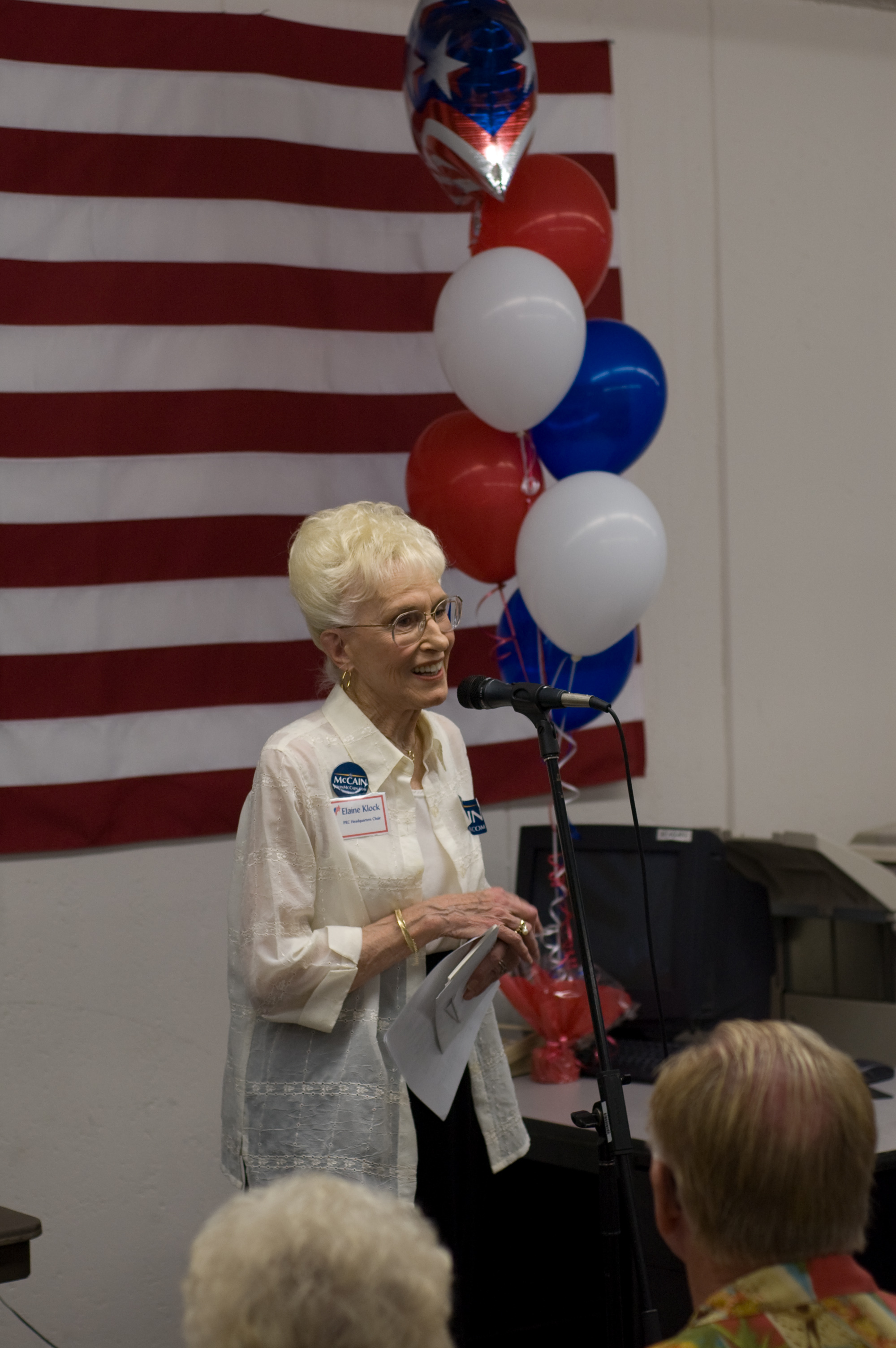
Elaine Klock, longest HQ president, at the Pasadena Republican Club HQ Grand Opening in 2008

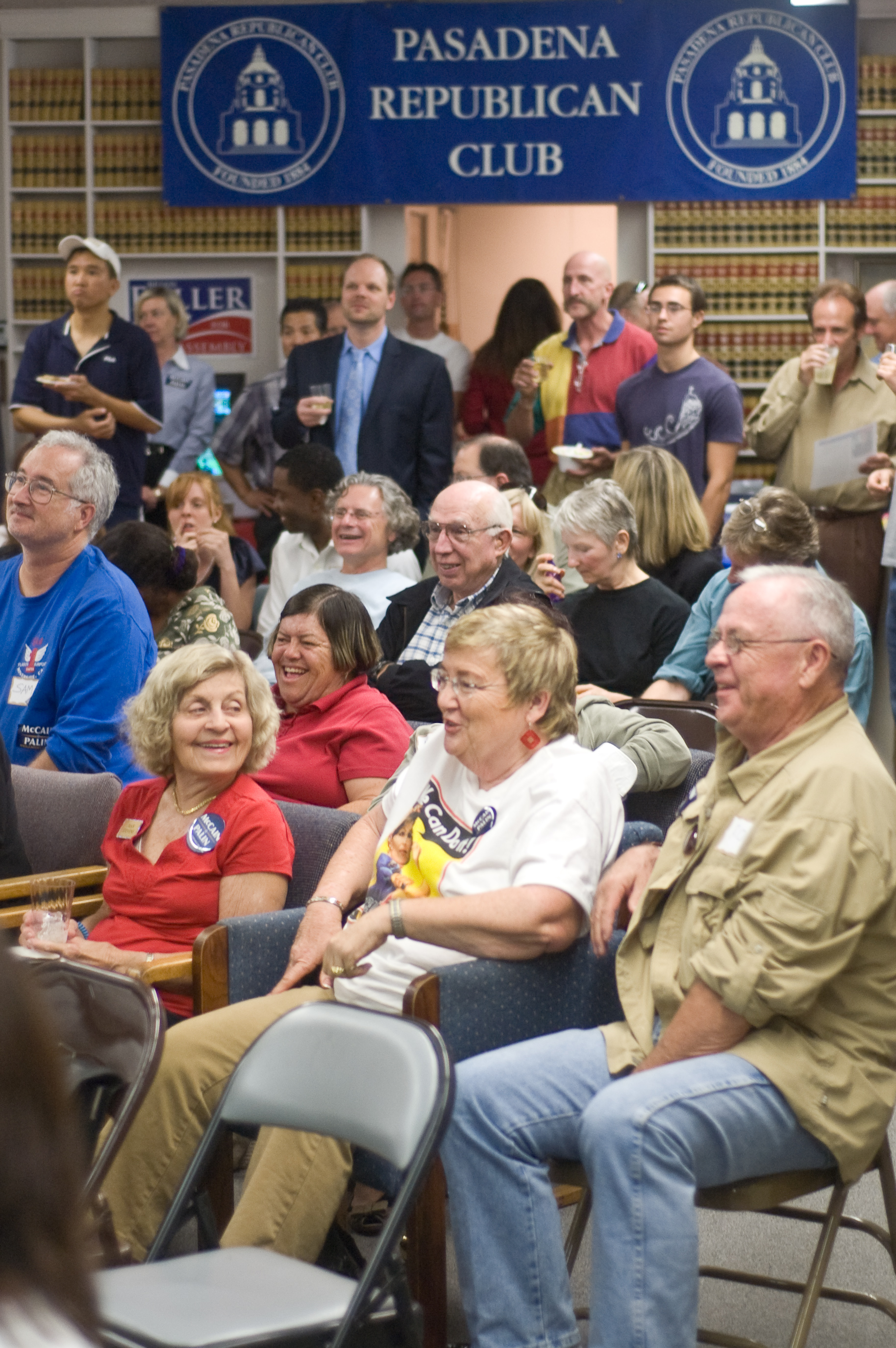
Members watch the third 2008 presidential general election presidential debate

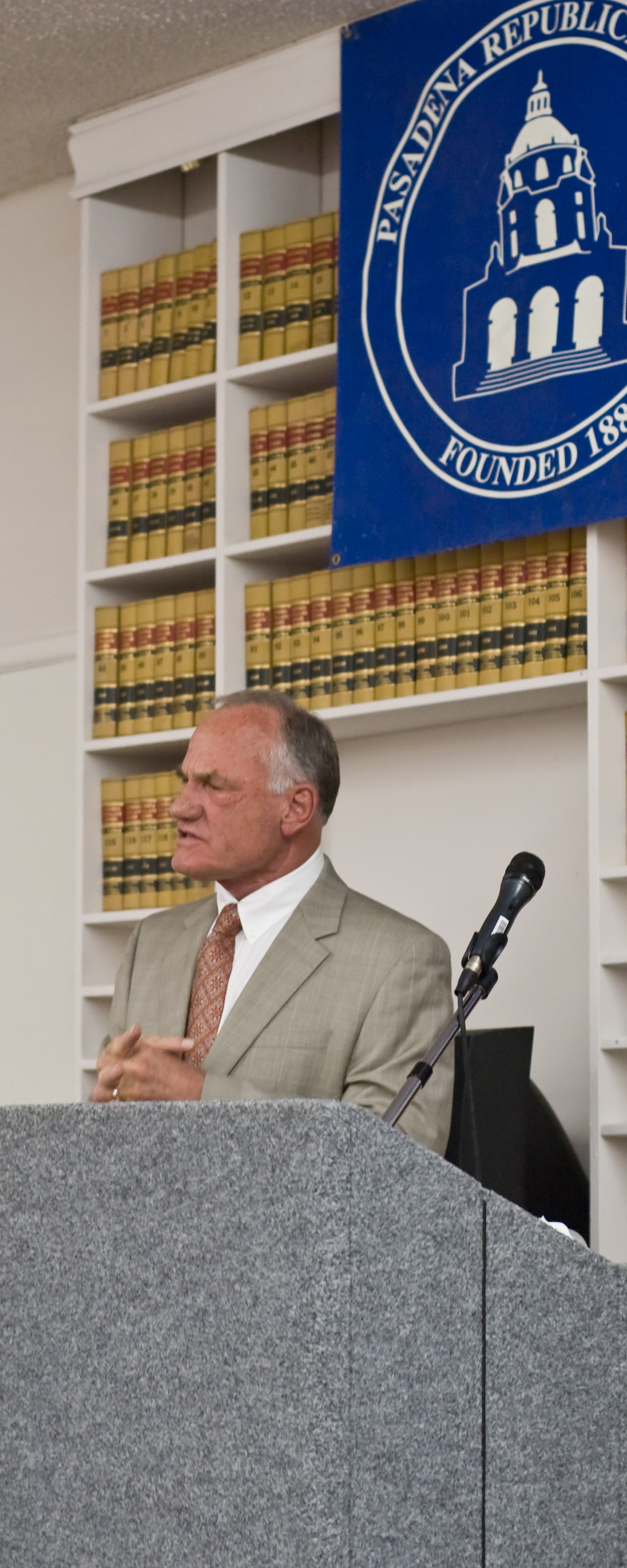
Barry Goldwater, Jr. at the Pasadena Republican Club
