= Mountain View Cemetery, Altadena =

Cemetery in Los Angeles County, California

Mountain View Cemetery
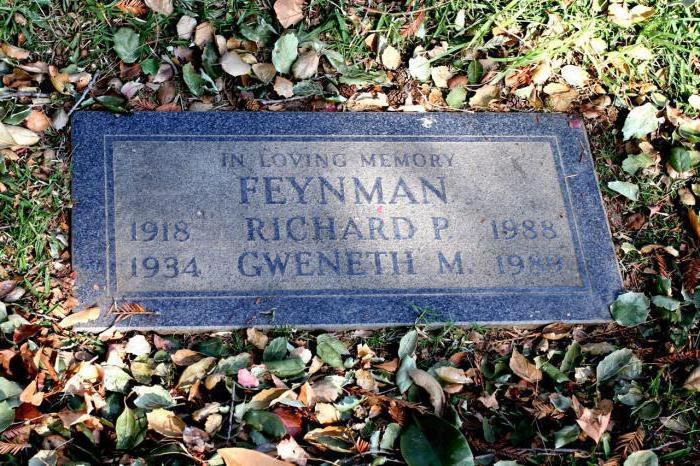
- The grave of Richard Feynman in the cemetery
- Interactive map of Mountain View Cemetery

Details
- Established: 1882 (144 years ago)
- Location: 2400 N Fair Oaks Avenue; Altadena, California
- Country: United States
- Coordinates: 34.186596°N 118.147556°W
- Size: 60 acres (24 ha)
- Website: https://www.mtn-view.com/
- Find a Grave: Mountain View Cemetery

Mountain View Cemetery and Mausoleum is a historic cemetery in Altadena, California, United States. Established in 1882, it contains over 70,000 burials in its approximately 60 acres (24 ha), including Pasadena's pioneering families and California statesmen and women. It also contains a section for Civil War burials.

The cemetery also includes a mausoleum, located across the street on Marengo Avenue, and the Pasadena Mausoleum, on Raymond Avenue.

== History ==
In the frontier era, the residents of Pasadena buried their relatives on family property. Colonel Jabez Banbury's son, Charles, for example, was buried on land that occupied part of the Arroyo Seco, now part of the Wrigley Estate. Banbury sold his property in 1882, at which point Levi W. Giddings set aside part of his own property to be used as a cemetery.

The following year, 24 burials were moved to the cemetery.

Between two burials is an empty grave with steel walls which is used in movies and television series to allow actors to get in and out for shooting purposes. Productions that have used the grave include American Horror Story, Promising Young Woman, Pretty Little Liars and Six Feet Under.

After the disappearance of Glenn Miller in 1944, it was rumored that he was buried in secret in Mountain View in the Altadena family plot.

Mountain View Mausoleum, located nearby, was built by Cecil E. Bryan. He is interred in Mountain View.

== Notable burials ==
- Herbert W. Armstrong
- John C. Austin
- Jabez Banbury
- Henrietta Ash Bancroft
- Ray Allen Billington
- Octavia E. Butler
- Eldridge Cleaver
- Richard Feynman
- Thaddeus S. C. Lowe
- Henry H. Markham
- John Hunt Painter
- George Reeves
- Seth Cook Rees
- Jane Bancroft Robinson
- Malcolm St. Clair
- Ray Vitte
