= Henrietta Ash Bancroft =

American professor, religious leader (1843–1929)

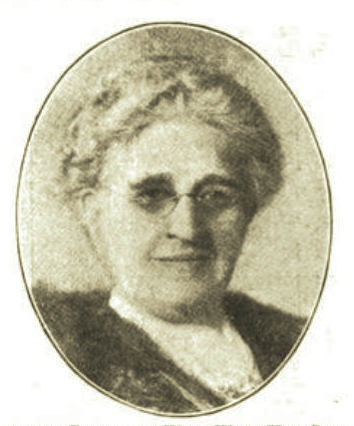
- Bancroft in 1924
- Born: October 1842; Cold Spring, New York, U.S.
- Died: February 10, 1929 (aged 86); Pasadena, California, U.S.
- Resting place: Mountain View Cemetery, Altadena
- Education: Albany State Normal School; Cornell College; University of Michigan; Oxford University; University of Strasbourg
- Occupations: professor; religious leader
- Employer: Albion College
- Known for: President Emeritus, Deaconess Department, Woman's Home Missionary Society of the Methodist Episcopal Church
- Relatives: Jane Bancroft Robinson (half-sister)

Henrietta Ash Bancroft (1843–1929) was an American professor and religious leader. For six years, she was professor of English and dean of women at Albion College. Leaving academia, she served as field secretary and general secretary of the Deaconess Department, Woman's Home Missionary Society of the Methodist Episcopal Church (MEC), being named president emeritus of the deaconess work after retirement.

== Early life and education ==
Henrietta Ash Bancroft was born in Cold Spring, New York, in October 1842. She was the daughter of the Rev. George C. Bancroft and Henrietta Ash Bancroft of Pennsylvania. Her early environment was that of a parsonage. had the usual environment of a preacher's household. Jane Bancroft Robinson was her half-sister.

She graduated from the Albany State Normal School, (later, University at Albany, SUNY) in 1878.

For some years, she was engaged in teaching.

In 1886, she was graduated from Cornell College, Mount Vernon, Iowa, with the degree of Ph. B., and two years later, too, her master's degree at the University of Michigan. After some years as professor of English in Cornell College, she went abroad for further study, attending courses in Gothic and Anglo-Saxon at Oxford University, afterward pursuing the same subjects at University of Strasbourg.

== Career ==
In 1892, Bancroft became professor of English and dean of women at Albion College, Albion, Michigan, where she remained until 1898. As a teacher and interpreter of English literature, Bancroft was highly skilled. She was an interpreter of such authors as Shakespeare and Browning.

While teaching in Albion College, Bancroft became interested in deaconess work and was induced to take up the field secretary work. She was recognized as an able speaker with a wide knowledge of the deaconess movement. In 1898, at the solicitation of the officers of the Woman's Home Missionary Society of the MEC, she gave up her college work to become the field secretary of the deaconess department of this society, that her sister, Jane Bancroft Robinson, had founded in 1888. For 16 years, she served in this role, having exchanged her quiet academic life for long, fatiguing travels in the promotion of the deaconess movement.

The small training school in Washington, whien was started in 1886, was in need of enlargement and Bancroft secured generous gifts for a new brick building which was named Rust Hall, in honor of Elizabeth Lownes Rust, the first corresponding secretary of the National Woman's Home Mission Society. The building was soon filled with students training as deaconesses.

Hearing a call for a training school in the midwest, Bancroft aided the establishment of a small institution at Kansas City, Missouri which was assisted by the gift of 10 acres (4.0 ha) by Mr. Schoelkopf. Again, Bancroft was able to secure money for the building and the wing of the school, which was named Fisk Hall, in honor of the national president, Jeannette Crippen Fisk (Mrs. Clinton B. Fisk).

The Schoelkopf heirs later gave Bancroft US$25,000 for the erection of a commodious hall named Schoelkopf Hall.

She later superintended the establishment of the San Francisco National Deaconess Training school and carried the responsibility of the work of these three institutions. Through her personal efforts, she brought more than US$200,000 in the treasury for these and other institutions.

Bancroft was made general secretary of the deaconess department in 1905 and served in this position until 1914, when ill health forced her to leave her public duties. She was never able thereafter to resume her work. As a tribute to her achievements, she was made president emeritus of deaconess work by national convention held in Pasadena, California.

== Death and legacy ==
In December 1917, she came to Pasadena with her sister Jane at whose home she died on February 10, 1929.

In the memory of her parents, Bancroft donated US$1,000 for the construction of a national retirement home in Ocean Grove, New Jersey, which carried the name Bancroft Rest Home for Missionaries and Deaconesses.
