= Cecil E. Bryan =

American architect and inventor

Cecil Eldridge Bryan
- Bryan pictured around 1950
- Born: March 26, 1878; Irving, Illinois, U.S.
- Died: March 24, 1951 (aged 72)
- Resting place: Mountain View Mausoleum, Altadena, California
- Occupation: Architect
- Spouse: Ethel Goembel Bryan

Cecil Eldridge Bryan (March 26, 1878 – March 24, 1951) was an American architect and inventor active in the first half of the 20th century. He designed over eighty mausoleums, at least one of which is now on the National Register of Historic Places. Upon his death, the Los Angeles Times called him the "dean of mausoleum builders."

== Life and career ==
Bryan was born in 1878, in Irving, Illinois, to Louis Negallian Bryan and Martha Alice Davis. He was the first of their two known children; Mabel was born four years later.

After completing his education, he went to work under Frank Lloyd Wright for a year, followed by another year with Ralph Modjeski, known for his work with reinforced concrete.

Bryan married Ethel Goembel, with whom he had two known children: Cecil Eldridge Bryan Jr. and Paul Goembel Bryan.

By 1912, Bryan was building mausoleums for the National Mausoleum Company (later the International Mausoleum Company). He went on to build over eighty such structures in seventeen states; nineteen of these were in Illinois. Many of them included stained glass by Louis Comfort Tiffany.

=== Notable selected works ===
- Evergreen Mausoleum, Morris, Illinois (1913; demolished in 1967)
- Beecher Mausoleum. Washington Township, Illinois (1914; now listed on the National Register of Historic Places)
- Hamilton Mausoleum, West Salem, Illinois (1914)
- Odd Fellows Mausoleum, Modesto, California (1914)
- Mountain View Mausoleum, Altadena, California (1923)
- Sunnyside Mausoleum, Long Beach, California
- Westview Abbey Mausoleum, Atlanta, Georgia (1943; his final work)

== Death ==
Bryan died in 1951, aged 72. He was interred in the Mountain View Mausoleum in Altadena, California, one of his own buildings, as were his wife and children. In his obituary, the Los Angeles Times called him the "dean of mausoleum builders."

Cheryl and Cecil E. Bryan III have been attempting to locate all of their grandfather's Community Mausoleums.

Bryan has a suite named for him at the Central Schoolhouse Inn in Geneseo, Illinois. He restored the building in 1914.
