= Jabez Banbury =

American Civil War veteran

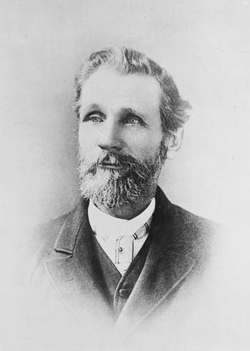
- Banbury in 1874
- Born: March 4, 1830; Cornwall, England
- Died: December 9, 1900 (aged 70)
- Burial place: Mountain View Cemetery, Altadena, California, U.S.
- Spouse: Sarah Elmira Dunton (1834–1900; his death)

Colonel Jabez Banbury (March 4, 1830 – December 9, 1900) was an early settler and founder of Pasadena, California. He served in the American Civil War, attaining the rank of colonel. He was also the first president of the Pasadena Republican Club, which was founded in 1884.

== Early life ==
Banbury was born in Cornwall, England, on the farm of his parents, Thomas Banbury and Mary Lysle. He attended school in Launceston until the age of ten or eleven. After the death of Banbury's mother at the age of fifty, the family emigrated to the United States, settling in Knox County, Ohio.

He worked for four years as an apprentice in a cabinet-making business in Mount Vernon. In late 1851, aged 21, he moved west to Iowa City, Iowa.

== Military service ==
Banbury was enlisted in the American Civil War as first lieutenant in the 5th Iowa Volunteer Infantry Regiment in July 1861. He was promoted to captain on December 2 the same year, then major the following July and, finally, colonel in April 1863.

After his discharge, on September 28, 1864, he returned to Marshall County, Iowa, and worked in the mercantile business for four years.

== Personal life ==
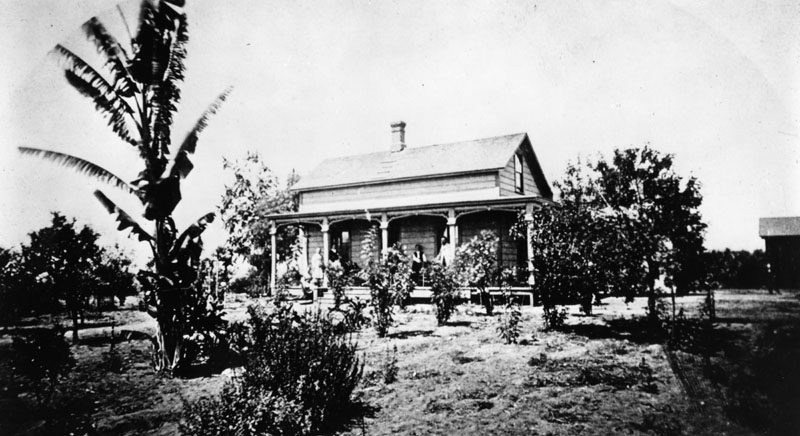
Banbury's Pasadena home, completed in 1874

Banbury married Sarah Elmira Dunton, the eldest daughter of Revd. Solomon Dunton, in November 1854. A year or so later, the couple moved to Marshall County, where Jabez worked as a carpenter and, later, a family grocers. He continued in this role until the outbreak of the Civil War in 1861.

After the war, he became a United States revenue collector of Marshall County. He later became auditor, but resigned after three-and-a-half years after his health began to fail. He and his family moved to California in 1873, arriving in Los Angeles in December. He built the second home in Pasadena's Orange Grove colonial grounds, a ranch house located between Colorado Boulevard and California Street, on South Orange Grove Avenue near the current Tournament of Roses' Wrigley Mansion. The home was completed the following March, and he spent the rest of his life there, initially working in the fruit-ranching business, then moved into lumber.

He was treasurer of the City of Marshalltown, Iowa, for four years, a member of the California State Assembly for two, the first treasurer of the City of Pasadena, for four years, and treasurer of Los Angeles County for four.

Banbury was one of the founders of the Rose Parade and founding member of the Pasadena School Board of Trustees.

Banbury had three children: Charles Morton (born 1858) and twin daughters Jennie and Jessie (1862). The girls became the first students to attend Pasadena's first school on Orange Grove.

He was also a Freemason.

== Death ==
Banbury died on December 9, 1900, aged 70. He is interred in Mountain View Cemetery in Altadena, California, where he joined his son. He was followed by his wife, who survived him by six years, and daughters.
