= Jane Bancroft Robinson =

Author and educator

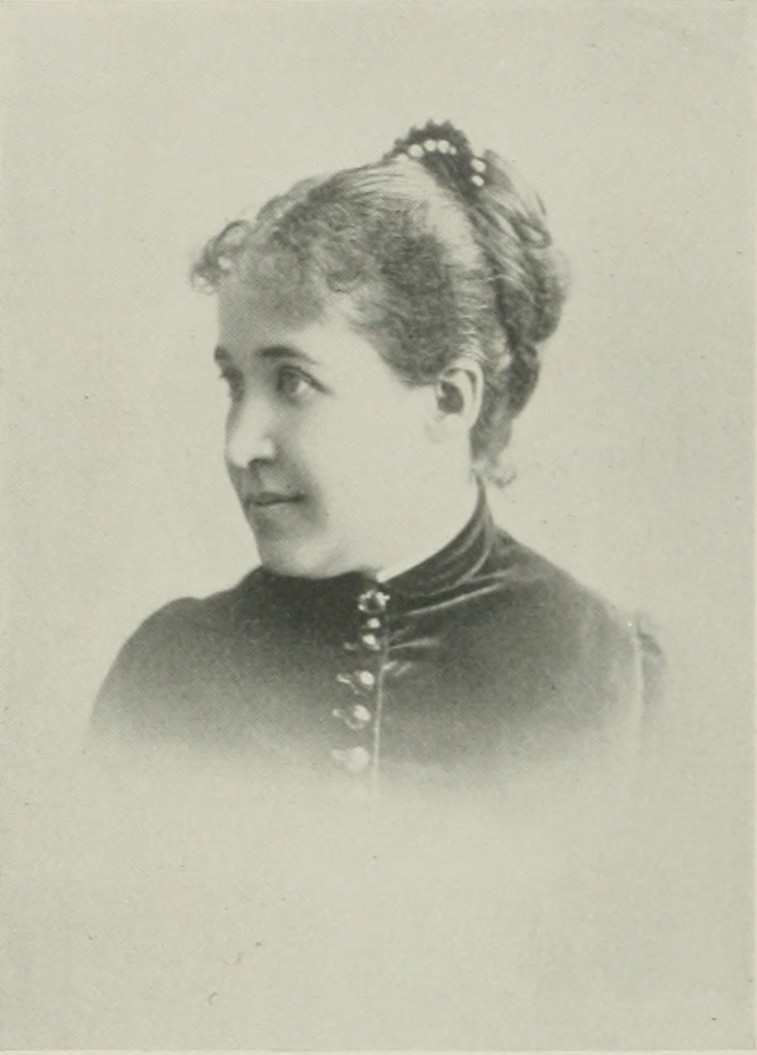
Photo portrait from A Woman of the Century

Jane Marie Bancroft Robinson (December 24, 1847 – May 29, 1932) was an American author and educator.

== Early life and education ==
Jane Marie Bancroft was born in West Stockbridge, Massachusetts, on December 24, 1847. She descended on her mother's side, Caroline J. Orton, from an old Dutch family of New York City, and on her father's side from early English settlers in New Jersey. Her father, Rev. George C. Bancroft, was for over fifty years a member of the Methodist Episcopal Church.

Bancroft graduated in 1871 from the Troy Female Seminary, founded by Emma Willard. In 1872 she graduated from the State Normal School in Albany, New York, and immediately there-after was appointed preceptress of Fort Edward Collegiate Institute, Fort Edward (town), New York, where she remained until 1876.

During the years from 1870 to 1876, colleges for women were being established, and the doors of colleges hitherto open only to men were thrown open to women. Urged by her far-sighted mother, Jane Bancroft determined to take a college course. While in Fort Edward, she took private lessons in advanced studies, and in the fall of 1876 entered Syracuse University as a member of the senior class, and was graduated from that institution in 1877.

In 1907, she was elected to Phi Beta Kappa society, and received two honorary doctorates, in 1919, from Syracuse University and in 1929, from the University of Southern California.

== Career ==
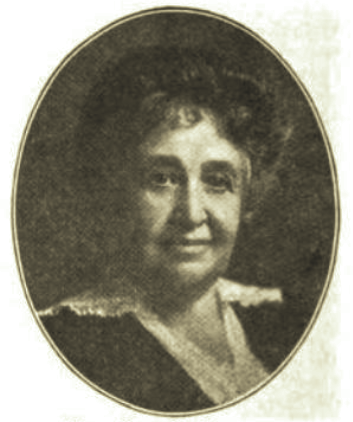
Robinson in 1925

Immediately after graduation from Syracuse University, Jane Bancroft was invited to become the dean of the Woman's College of the Northwestern University in Evanston, Illinois, and professor of the French language and literature, a position previously occupied by Frances Willard and Ellen Soule Carhart. She founded the Western Association of Collegiate Alumnae, an early model of the American Association of University Women.

In addition to the arduous work of the position, she diligently pursued her studies in French history, with a view to taking a higher degree, and she received from Syracuse University, upon examination, the degree of Ph. M. in 1880, and of Ph.D. in 1883. Her thesis for the latter degree, A Study of the Parliament of Paris and Other Parliaments of France was a treatise on the parliament of Paris and other parliaments of France, and the research and study therein displayed won her at once a fine reputation. It was published in 1884. Many of the leading historical students in the U.S. and England sent her appreciative letters.

In 1885, she resigned her position in the Northwestern University to pursue historical studies as a fellow of history in Bryn Mawr College, the first recipient of the history fellowship at that institution. In 1886, she went to Europe, matriculated in the University of Zurich, and remained there one year, devoting herself to the study of political and constitutional history. The following year, she went to Paris and became a student in the Paris-Sorbonne University, continuing her researches in history. She was also received as a student in the École pratique des hautes études, being the first woman to hear lectures in the literary department of that school.

Her stay abroad was diversified by travel and writing. She contributed to various papers and periodicals. Visiting London before her return to the United States, she became deeply interested in the deaconess work as illustrated in different institutions there and studied it carefully. She returned to the United States, convinced that that social and religious movement might prove a great agency in the uplifting of the poor and the degraded of her native land. Her wide information and executive ability were at once pressed into service for developing deaconess work in the United States, where it had already gained a foothold.

At the invitation of its officers, in 1888, she founded and took full charge of the department of deaconess work in the Woman's Foreign Missionary Society of the Methodist Episcopal Church. She visited most of the large cities of the United States, speaking in behalf of the deaconess cause, and interesting the women of different Protestant churches by means of parlor meetings and public lectures. She was a logical and fluent speaker as well as a writer of marked talent. From 1908 to 1913, she was the president of the Woman's Home Missionary Society.

In 1889, she published her most important work, entitled "Deaconesses in Europe and their Lessons for America," which was the leading authority in the United States upon the subject.

She was the secretary of the Bureau for Deaconess Work of the Woman's Home Missionary Society. She was a life member of the American Historical Association and of the American Economic Association. She was connected with many philanthropic and social organizations.

== Personal life ==
In 1891, she married Hon. George Orville Robinson (1832–1915), of Detroit, Michigan, a lawyer, widely known in philanthropic and legal circles. He was the founder of the Michigan Christian Advocate and aided his wife's work by giving generously to the construction of deaconess institutions.

Three years after the death of her husband in 1915, she moved with her half-sister Henrietta Ash Bancroft (October 26, 1842 – February 10, 1929) to Pasadena, California.

She died in Pasadena, California, on May 29, 1932, and is buried at Mountain View Cemetery, Altadena, California.

== Legacy ==
Jane Bancroft Robinson donated more than US$10,000 ($165,364.38 in 2017) to the California Institute of Technology in Pasadena, California. She donated her home and land for the construction of retirement homes for deaconesses and ministers.
