= 19th Infantry Regiment (United States) =

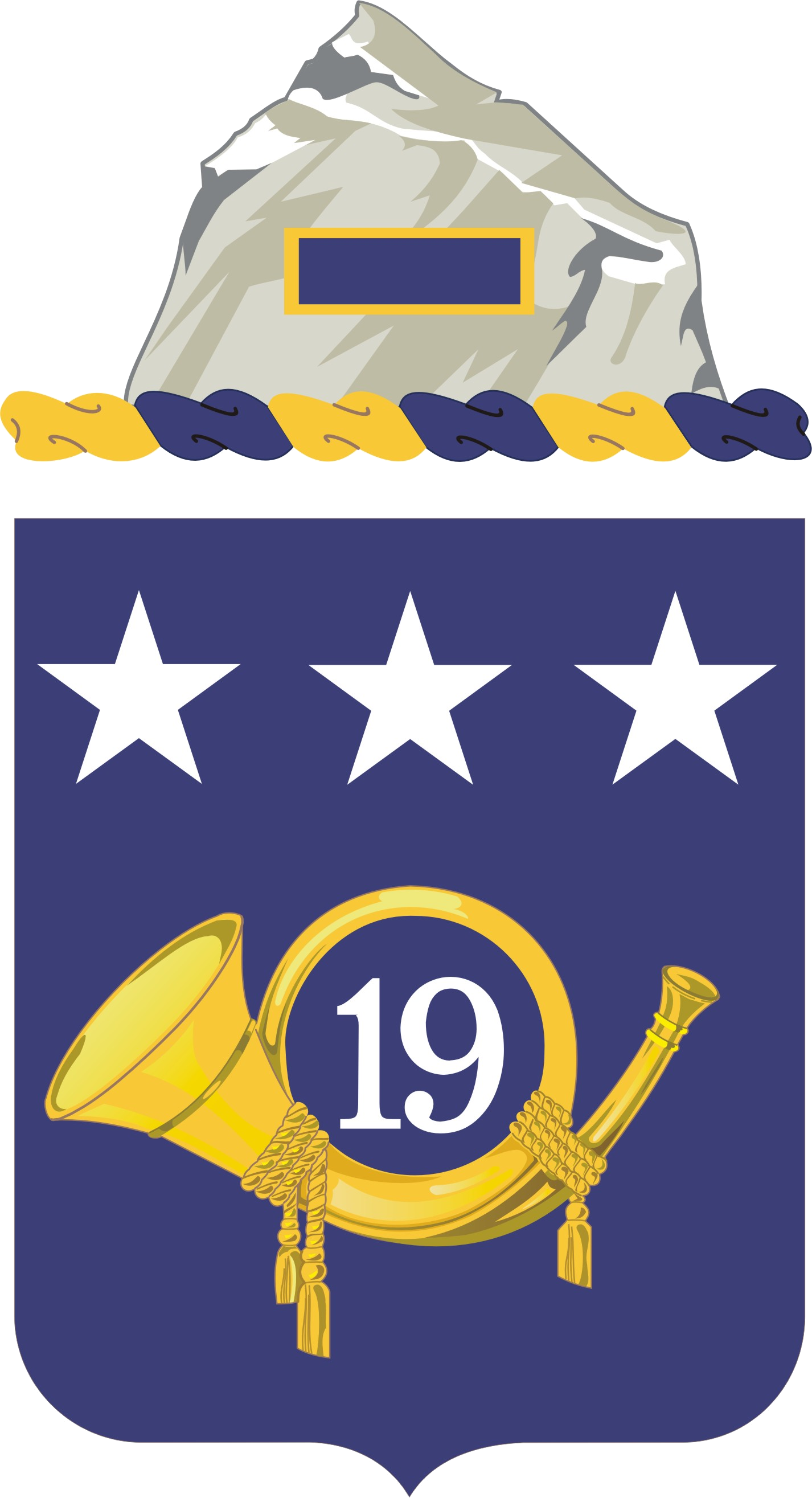
- Coat of arms
- Active: 1861
- Country: United States
- Branch: United States Army
- Type: Infantry
- Role: Infantry training
- Size: Regiment
- Part of: US Army Training and Doctrine Command
- Garrison/HQ: Fort Benning, Georgia
- Nickname: "The Rock of Chickamauga" (special designation)
- Motto: The Rock of Chickamauga
- Engagements: American Civil War; Spanish–American War; World War II; Korean War; Vietnam War

Commanders
- Notable commanders: William T. Wood (1910–1911); John F. Madden (1919–1920); Herman Hall (1919–1920); Charles Hartwell Bonesteel Jr. (1938–1940)

Insignia
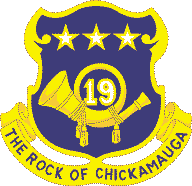
- Distinctive unit insignia

The 19th Infantry Regiment ("Rock of Chickamauga") is a United States Army infantry regiment which is assigned to the US Army Training and Doctrine Command, with the assignment of conducting Basic and Advanced Infantry Training.

== Lineage ==
=== 1st Battalion ===
==== Civil War ====
- Constituted 1861-05-03 in the Regular Army as the 1st Battalion, 19th Infantry Regiment
- Organized 1861-07-09 at Indianapolis, Indiana

==== Indian Wars ====
- Reorganized and redesignated 1866-10-01 as the 19th Infantry Regiment
- Consolidated 1869-03-15 with the 28th Infantry Regiment (see Below) and consolidated unit designated as the 19th Infantry Regiment.

==== World War I ====
- Assigned 1918-07-29 to the 18th Division
- Relieved 1919-02-14 from assignment to the 18th Division

==== Garrison period ====
- Took part in quelling the 1921 miners' rebellion at the Battle of Blair Mountain in Logan, WV. This was the largest labor battle in US history and took three infantry regiments to halt. The 19th Infantry took the lead role, traveling up the Spruce Fork River to Blair, WV, and dispersing the miners. Once the 19th arrived, the miners, many of whom were veterans fresh from WWI, surrendered peaceably and departed for their homes.
- Assigned 1922-10-17 to the Hawaiian Division, and stationed at Schofield Barracks.
- Divisional assignment changed on 1941-08-26 from the Hawaiian Division to the 24th Infantry Division

==== World War II ====
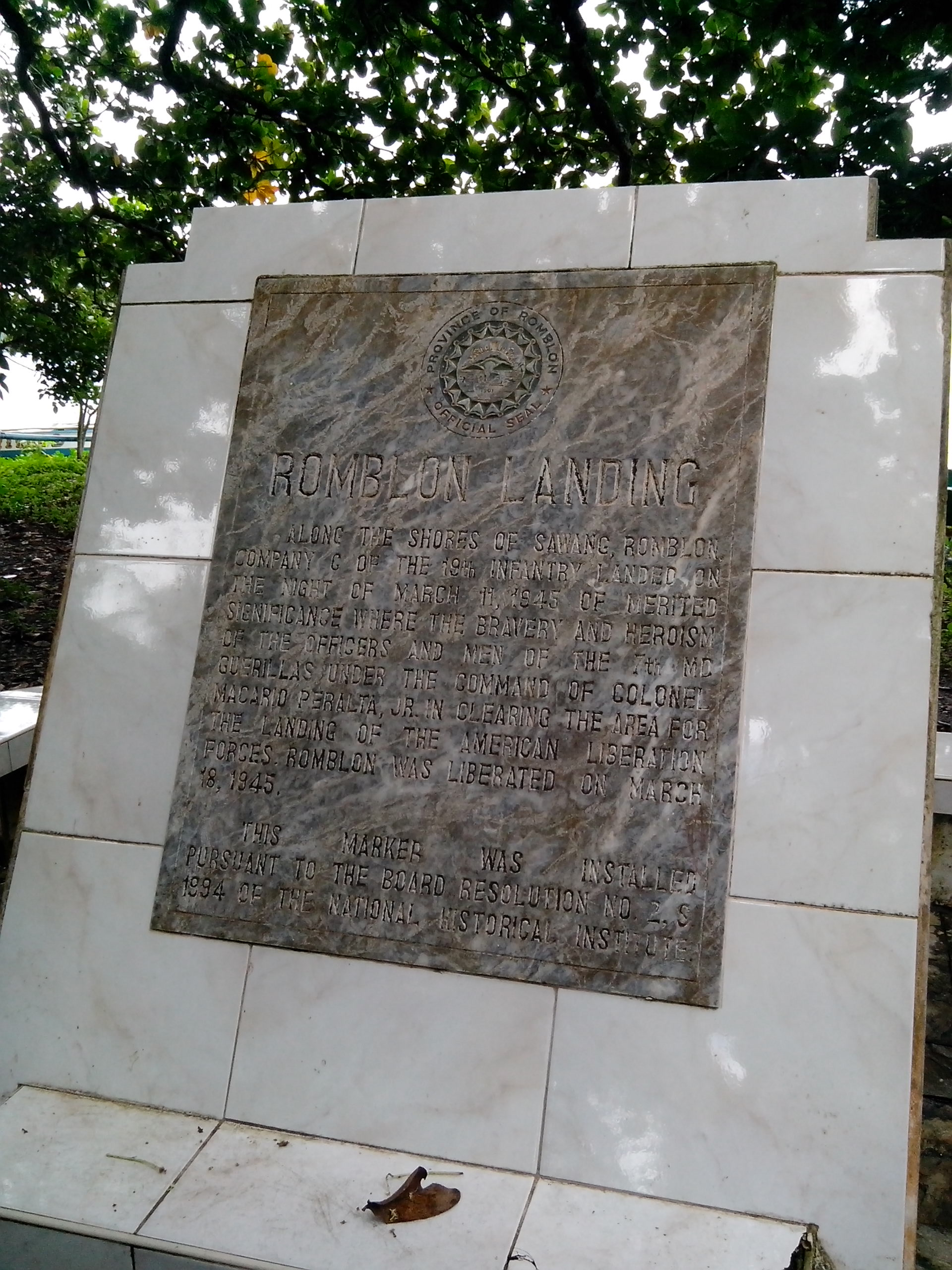
Plaque commemorating the landing of American liberation forces in Sawang, Romblon during World War II

- Deployed forward from Hawaii on 1943-07-30.
- Regiment arrived in Australia on 1943-08-08,
- Regiment moved to Goodenough Island on 1944-01-26.
- Regiment assaulted Tanahmerah Bay, New Guinea on 1944-04-22.
- Regiment departed Humboldt Bay, New Guinea in stages between 1944-10-07 and 1944-10-12, and Assaulted Leyte Island in the Philippines on 1944-10-20.
- Regiment attached to the US 6th Army from 1944-11-20.
- Regiment assaulted Mindoro, Philippines on 1944-12-15.
- The Army attachment was changed from the 6th US Army to the 8th US Army on 1945-01-01.
- Regiment was relieved from attachment to 8th Army on 1945-02-01
- Regiment assaulted Romblon Island on 1945-03-11 and Simara Island on 1945-03-12, and Malabang, Mindanao on 1945-04-17.
- Regiment was at Davao, Mindanao on 1945-08-20.
- Regiment arrived in Japan for Occupation Duty on 1945-10-22, where they were active through 1946.

==== Korean War ====
- 1st Battalion, 19th Regiment was part of the 24th Infantry Division and fought in the Kum River line and so on.

==== Cold War ====
- Relieved 1958-06-05 from assignment to the 25th Infantry Division and reorganized as a parent regiment under the Combat Arms Regimental System

==== Garrison duty ====
- Withdrawn 1989-06-16 from the Combat Arms Regimental System, reorganized under the United States Army Regimental System, transferred to the United States Army Training and Doctrine Command, and assigned to Basic and Advanced Infantry Training duty at Fort Benning, Georgia.

=== 2nd Battalion ===
==== Civil War ====
- Constituted 1861-05-03 in the Regular Army as the 2d Battalion, 19th Infantry.
- Organized 1863-03-31 at Fort Wayne (Detroit).

==== Indian wars ====
- Reorganized and redesignated 1866-10-01 as the 28th Infantry Regiment.

==== Consolidation ====
- Consolidated 1869-03-15 with the 19th Infantry and consolidated unit designated as the 19th Infantry Regiment.

==== Korean War ====
- 2nd Battalion, 19th Regiment was part of the 24th Infantry Division and fought in the Geum River line and so on.

==== Garrison duty ====
- Withdrawn 1989-06-16 from the Combat Arms Regimental System, reorganized under the United States Army Regimental System, transferred to the United States Army Training and Doctrine Command, and assigned to Basic and Advanced Infantry Training duty at then Fort Benning, Georgia.

=== 3d Battalion ===
- Constituted 3 May 1861 in the Regular Army as the 3d Battalion, 19th Infantry Regiment.
- Organized May 1865 - September 1866 at Fort Wayne, Michigan; Newport Barracks, Kentucky; and Fort Columbus, New York
- Reorganized and redesignated 23 November 1866 as the 37th Infantry Regiment.
- One-half of the 37th Infantry consolidated August–December 1869 with the 3d Infantry and consolidated unit designated as the 3d Infantry (remaining half of the 37th Infantry consolidated in June 1869 with the 5th Infantry and consolidated unit designated as the 5th Infantry — hereafter separate lineage).

== Campaign participation credit ==
- Civil War:
1. Shiloh;
2. Murfreesborough;
3. Chickamauga;
4. Chattanooga;
5. Atlanta;
6. Kentucky 1862;
7. Mississippi 1862;
8. Tennessee 1863;
9. Georgia 1864
- Indian Wars:
1. Utes
- War with Spain:
1. Puerto Rico
- Philippine Insurrection:
1. Cebu 1899;
2. Panay 1899;
3. Cebu 1900;
4. Panay 1900;
5. Bohol 1901;
6. Cebu 1901
- World War II:
1. Central Pacific;
2. New Guinea (with arrowhead);
3. Leyte (with arrowhead);
4. Luzon (with arrowhead);
5. Southern Philippines (with arrowhead)
- Korean War:
1. UN Defensive;
2. UN Offensive;
3. CCF Intervention;
4. First UN Counteroffensive;
5. CCF Spring Offensive;
6. UN Summer-Fall Offensive;
7. Second Korean Winter;
8. Korea, Summer 1953

== Decorations ==
- Presidential Unit Citation (Army) for LEYTE
- Presidential Unit Citation (Army) for DAVAO
- Presidential Unit Citation (Army) for DEFENSE OF KOREA
- Philippine Presidential Unit Citation for 17 OCTOBER 1944 TO 4 JULY 1945
- Republic of Korea Presidential Unit Citation for PYONGTAEK*
- Republic of Korea Presidential Unit Citation for KOREA 1953

== In popular culture ==
- The 19th Infantry Regiment's participation in the Korean War is featured in the 1951 film The Steel Helmet.

== See also ==
- List of United States Regular Army Civil War units
