= Irving, Illinois =

- Village
- Location in Montgomery County, Illinois
- Coordinates: 39°12′20″N 89°24′19″W
- Country: United States
- State: Illinois
- County: Montgomery
- Township: Irving

Area
  - Total: 0.90 sq mi (2.32 km^{2})
  - Land: 0.90 sq mi (2.32 km^{2})
  - Water: 0 sq mi (0.00 km^{2})
- Elevation: 653 ft (199 m)

Population (2020)
  - Total: 373
  - Density: 415.9/sq mi (160.57/km^{2})
- Time zone: UTC-6 (CST)
  - Summer (DST): UTC-5 (CDT)
- ZIP code: 62051
- Area code: 217
- FIPS code: 17-37738
- GNIS feature ID: 2398276

Irving is a village in Montgomery County, Illinois, United States. The population was 373 at the 2020 census, down from 495 in 2010.

== Geography ==
Irving is in east-central Montgomery County along Illinois Route 16. Hillsboro, the county seat, is 6 miles (10 km) to the southwest, and Witt is 5 miles (8 km) to the northeast.

According to the U.S. Census Bureau, Irving has a total area of 0.90 square miles (2.33 km^{2}), all land. The village drains west toward Little Creek, a west-flowing tributary of the Middle Fork of Shoal Creek, part of the Kaskaskia River watershed.

== Demographics ==
Historical population
| Census | Pop. | Note | %± |
|---|---|---|---|
| 1870 | 751 | | — |
| 1880 | 559 | | −25.6% |
| 1890 | 630 | | 12.7% |
| 1900 | 675 | | 7.1% |
| 1910 | 678 | | 0.4% |
| 1920 | 519 | | −23.5% |
| 1930 | 553 | | 6.6% |
| 1940 | 588 | | 6.3% |
| 1950 | 539 | | −8.3% |
| 1960 | 570 | | 5.8% |
| 1970 | 599 | | 5.1% |
| 1980 | 612 | | 2.2% |
| 1990 | 516 | | −15.7% |
| 2000 | 2,484 | | 381.4% |
| 2010 | 495 | | −80.1% |
| 2020 | 373 | | −24.6% |
U.S. Decennial Census

The 2000 census showed a population of 2,484 because the inmates of the Graham Correction Center at Hillsboro were included in Irving's count.

As of the census of 2000, there were 2,484 people, 186 households, and 137 families residing in the village. The population density was 3,038.1 inhabitants per square mile (1,173.0/km^{2}). There were 204 housing units at an average density of 249.5 per square mile (96.3/km^{2}). The racial makeup of the village was 53.74% White, 41.91% African American, 0.36% Native American, 0.04% Asian, 3.86% from other races, and 0.08% from two or more races. Hispanic or Latino of any race were 5.60% of the population.

There were 186 households, out of which 39.8% had children under the age of 18 living with them, 54.8% were married couples living together, 11.3% had a female householder with no husband present, and 26.3% were non-families. 23.1% of all households were made up of individuals, and 12.4% had someone living alone who was 65 years of age or older. The average household size was 2.58 and the average family size was 2.96.

In the village, the population was spread out, with 5.9% under the age of 18, 20.4% from 18 to 24, 57.6% from 25 to 44, 13.0% from 45 to 64, and 3.1% who were 65 years of age or older. The median age was 32 years. For every 100 females, there were 889.6 males. For every 100 females age 18 and over, there were 1,191.2 males.

The median income for a household in the village was $24,583, and the median income for a family was $30,313. Males had a median income of $22,083 versus $16,563 for females. The per capita income for the village was $12,144. About 24.2% of families and 29.2% of the population were below the poverty line, including 36.4% of those under age 18 and 19.4% of those age 65 or over.

== Notable people ==
- Cecil E. Bryan, architect and inventor, born in Irving
- Buddy Cole, musician and bandleader, born in Irving
- John A. Graham, Illinois state senator and businessman, born on a farm near Irving
- William T. Wood, U.S. Army brigadier general
