= International Mausoleum Company =

US building organization

- Formerly: National Mausoleum Company
- Industry: Funeral services, Construction
- Headquarters: First National Bank building, Chicago, Illinois, U.S.
- Key people: F. L. Maytag (president); G. A .Smith (secretary); Cecil E. Bryan (architect)

The International Mausoleum Company was an American company which built community mausoleums under patents of the company's vice-president and founder, William Ira Hood, thus protecting their construction in reinforced concrete.

Initially formed in 1907 as the National Mausoleum Company, the first mausoleum corporation in the United States, in Shelby, Ohio, its headquarters were moved in 1914 to the First National Bank building in Chicago, Illinois. The company was renamed during this move.

By 1911, the company had erected over three hundred mausoleums, sixty-six of which contained over 17,000 crypts.

Cecil E. Bryan, known as the "dean of mausoleum builders", became one of its architects by 1912. He designed over eighty mausoleums during his lifetime.

The company's motto was "The Better Way", referencing their community plan of mausoleum burial as being "the best the world has ever known and the surest of universal adoption."

In 1913, Princeton, Illinois, enjoined the company from building a community mausoleum in the city's Oakland Cemetery, despite the two having entered into a contract to have built a 240-crypt mausoleum built out of Bedford stone. Judge Joe A. Davis, in the Circuit Court of Princeton, granted the voiding of the contract. Several of the aldermen who were initially against the project changed their minds upon being shown a completed mausoleum in Galesburg, Illinois, by S. W. Holmes of the International Museum Company; however, several citizens signed a petition asking the council to refuse to grant the project's final approval.
