= South Hurricane Township, Fayette County, Illinois =

South Hurricane Township
- Township
- Location in Fayette County

- Fayette County's location in Illinois
- Coordinates: 39°06′56″N 89°11′49″W
- Country: United States
- State: Illinois
- County: Fayette
- Established: November 9, 1859

Area
  - Total: 27.06 sq mi (70.1 km^{2})
  - Land: 27.06 sq mi (70.1 km^{2})
  - Water: 0 sq mi (0 km^{2}) 0%
- Elevation: 620 ft (189 m)

Population (2020)
  - Total: 220
  - Density: 8.1/sq mi (3.1/km^{2})
- Time zone: UTC-6 (CST)
  - Summer (DST): UTC-5 (CDT)
- ZIP codes: 62011, 62080
- FIPS code: 17-051-70876

South Hurricane Township is one of twenty townships in Fayette County, Illinois, USA. As of the 2020 census, its population was 220 and it contained 100 housing units. This township split from Hurricane Township sometime after 1921.

== Geography ==
According to the 2021 census gazetteer files, South Hurricane Township has a total area of 27.06 square miles (70.09 km^{2}), all land. The township contains the southwest edge of Ramsey Lake State Recreation Area.

=== Cities, towns, villages ===
- Bingham

=== Unincorporated towns ===
- Bayle City

=== Cemeteries ===
The township contains these nine cemeteries: Cearlock, Donaldson, Fox, Harris, Isbell, Liberty, Nave, Poland and Pope.

== Demographics ==
As of the 2020 census there were 220 people, 125 households, and 108 families residing in the township. The population density was 8.13 inhabitants per square mile (3.14/km^{2}). There were 100 housing units at an average density of 3.69 per square mile (1.42/km^{2}). The racial makeup of the township was 94.09% White, 0.00% African American, 0.45% Native American, 0.45% Asian, 0.00% Pacific Islander, 0.00% from other races, and 5.00% from two or more races. Hispanic or Latino of any race were 2.27% of the population.

There were 125 households, out of which 28.80% had children under the age of 18 living with them, 80.00% were married couples living together, 6.40% had a female householder with no spouse present, and 13.60% were non-families. 12.80% of all households were made up of individuals, and 4.00% had someone living alone who was 65 years of age or older. The average household size was 2.29 and the average family size was 2.43.

The township's age distribution consisted of 16.4% under the age of 18, 4.2% from 18 to 24, 14.6% from 25 to 44, 36% from 45 to 64, and 28.7% who were 65 years of age or older. The median age was 55.4 years. For every 100 females, there were 134.4 males. For every 100 females age 18 and over, there were 119.3 males.

The median income for a household in the township was $44,375, and the median income for a family was $47,857. Males had a median income of $41,875 versus $43,229 for females. The per capita income for the township was $23,184. About 16.7% of families and 19.6% of the population were below the poverty line, including 21.3% of those under age 18 and 0.0% of those age 65 or over.

Historical population
Census	Pop.	Note	%±
2000	348		—
2010	308		−11.5%
2020	220		−28.6%
2016 (est.)	304		−1.3%
U.S. Decennial Census

== School districts ==
- Ramsey Community Unit School District 204

== Political districts ==
- Illinois' 17th congressional district
- State House District 98
- State Senate District 49
