= Dressor, Illinois =

- Unincorporated community
- Location within Illinois Location within the United States
- Coordinates: 39°10′23″N 89°03′04″W
- Country: United States
- State: Illinois
- County: Fayette
- Township: Ramsey
- Named after: Nathaniel Dressor
- Elevation: 600 ft (180 m)
- Time zone: UTC-6 (Central (CST))
  - Summer (DST): UTC-5 (CDT)
- Area code: 618
- GNIS feature ID: 422635

Dressor is an unincorporated community in Ramsey Township, Fayette County, Illinois, United States. Dressor is 3.7 miles (6.0 km) northeast of Ramsey.

== History ==
A post office was established at Dressor in 1888, and remained in operation until 1942. Nathaniel Dressor, the original owner of the town site, gave the community his name.
