= Fayette County Courthouse (Illinois) =

Local government building in the United States

Coordinates: 38°57′36″N 89°5′58″W

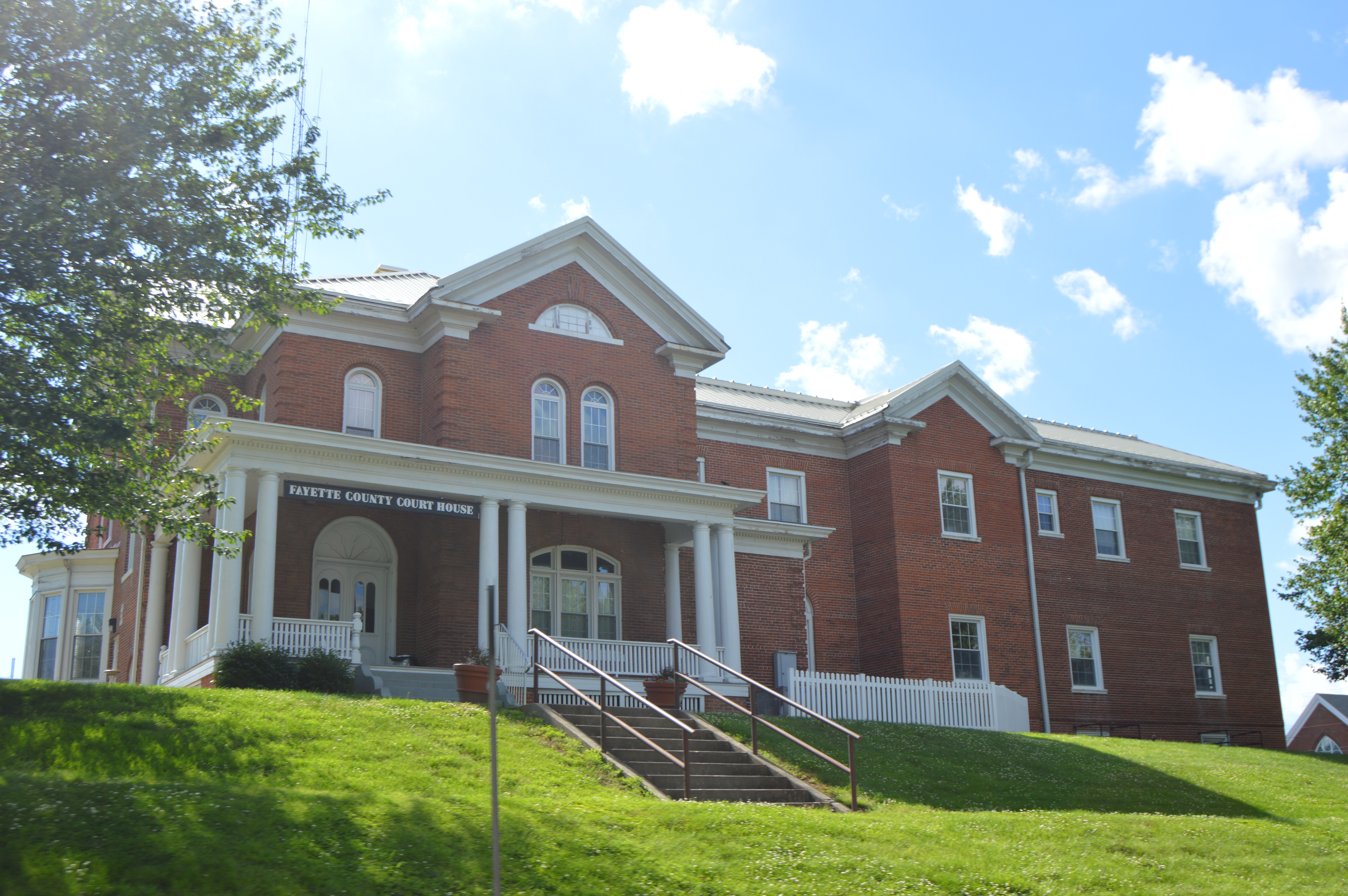
Eastern facade

The Fayette County Courthouse is a government building in Vandalia, the county seat of Fayette County, Illinois, United States. Converted from a residence in the 1930s, it succeeded a former state capitol as the courthouse for Fayette County.

== Previous courthouses ==
The initial capital of Illinois was Kaskaskia on the Mississippi River, but the first years of statehood saw the center of population gradually move northward, and in 1819 the legislature decreed the creation of a new capital along the Kaskaskia River in Bond County, in the center of the state. Named Vandalia, the city was platted by the end of 1820; eastern Bond County was split off into the new Fayette County in early 1821, and Vandalia was declared the county seat. A small log building was soon erected on the site and used both by the legislature and the new county, but this state of affairs ceased when the building was destroyed by fire. It was later replaced by a brick structure, while county offices rented spaces in an assortment of buildings.

By the mid-1830s, continued northern migration had prompted calls for the capital to be relocated farther north, and the meager quality of the brick capitol provided further arguments for those advocating relocation. Afraid to lose their status as capital, a group of Vandalia residents built a new capitol building for the state in 1836, but legislators nevertheless chose to move north to Springfield. No longer needing the building, the state gave the property to the county for courthouse purposes in 1839. The state bought back the courthouse in 1918, but it remained in county use until 1933, when the state began to restore it for museum use.

== Current courthouse ==
Born in Hannover in the early nineteenth century, Frederick Remann emigrated to the United States, where he married and fathered a son, future state representative Frederick Remann II, and moved his family to Vandalia. Father and son together operated a local business, which was prosperous enough to permit Remann (whether father or son is uncertain) to build a mansion west of central Vandalia in the 1860s or 1870s. Although it began as an example of the Italianate style, the house lost its grand tower between 1878 and 1904, the arcade supporting the front porch was eventually replaced with pairs of columns, and a two-story bay window was reduced to the first story only.

With the state planning to convert the courthouse into a museum, Fayette County officials purchased the former Remann House in 1932 and began remodelling it for their own purposes; offices moved into the new courthouse in the following year. As the twentieth century passed, the Remann House gradually became too small for the county's needs, so several adjacent buildings were purchased or constructed. These arrangements also proving inconvenient, the county embarked on another construction project; when work concluded in 1995, the county complex had been converted into a single large connected building, although elements of the Remann design survive, including the bay window, the porch, and much of the basic form of the house.
