= Bayle City, Illinois =

- Unincorporated community
- Location within Illinois Location within the United States
- Coordinates: 39°06′50″N 89°09′58″W
- Country: United States
- State: Illinois
- County: Fayette
- Township: South Hurricane
- Elevation: 614 ft (187 m)
- Time zone: UTC-6 (Central (CST))
  - Summer (DST): UTC-5 (CDT)
- Area code: 618
- GNIS feature ID: 403986

Bayle City is an unincorporated community in South Hurricane Township, Fayette County, Illinois, United States. Bayle City is located on County Route 20, 2.5 miles (4.0 km) east of Bingham.
