= Bluff City, Illinois =

Bluff City, Illinois may refer to:

Unincorporated communities

- Bluff City, Fayette County, Illinois
- Bluff City, Schuyler County, Illinois
