= Loogootee =

Loogootee may refer to:

- Loogootee, Illinois
- Loogootee, Indiana
