= Confidence, Illinois =

- Unincorporated community
- Location within Illinois Location within the United States
- Coordinates: 38°55′22″N 88°55′35″W
- Country: United States
- State: Illinois
- County: Fayette
- Township: Otego
- Elevation: 571 ft (174 m)
- Time zone: UTC-6 (Central (CST))
  - Summer (DST): UTC-5 (CDT)
- Area code: 618
- GNIS feature ID: 422574

Confidence is an unincorporated community in Otego Township, Fayette County, Illinois, United States, 9.4 miles (15.1 km) east-southeast of Vandalia.
