= Shobonier, Illinois =

- Unincorporated community
- Location within the state of Illinois
- Coordinates: 38°50′43″N 89°5′4″W
- Country: United States
- State: Illinois
- County: Fayette
- Township: Kaskaskia
- Time zone: UTC-6 (Central (CST))
  - Summer (DST): UTC-5 (CDT)
- ZIP codes: 62885

Shobonier is an unincorporated community, located on U.S. Route 51, about 10 miles south of Vandalia in Fayette County, Illinois. The population for the Shobonier ZIP code area, including rural areas surrounding the community, was 839 at the 2010 census.

The community was named after a local Indian chieftain.
