= Loudon Township =

Loudon Township may refer to the following townships in the United States:

- Loudon Township, Fayette County, Illinois
- Loudon Township, Carroll County, Ohio
- Loudon Township, Seneca County, Ohio
