= John J. Bullington =

American politician

John Jefferson Bullington (July 12, 1879 – August 31, 1929) was an American lawyer, soldier, and politician.

Bullington was born in Vandalia, Illinois and went to the public schools in Fayette County, Illinois. He went to Austin College in Effingham, Illinois. He taught school and was admitted to the Illinois bar in 1909. He practiced law in Taylorville, Illinois. Bullington served in the United States Army during the Mexican Border Campaign and World War I. He was commissioned a colonel. Bullington served in the Illinois House of Representatives in 1917-1918 and was a Democrat. Bullington died in a hospital in St. Louis, Missouri after surgery to remove a brain tumor.
