= Nathaniel Dressor =

American politician (1825–1915)

Nathaniel S. Dressor (June 24, 1825 – January 18, 1915) was a Populist member of the Illinois Senate.

Nathaniel S. Dressor was born near Temple, Maine on June 24, 1825, to Rufus and Taar Dressor. Dressor moved to Bond County, Illinois in 1837. He married Sarah Elizabeth McFarland of Reno, Illinois, with whom he would have five children, on April 3, 1848. One of his daughters, Julia, was married to William Northcott a year prior to her death. In 1882, he was the President of the First National Bank of Greenville. Dressor was elected to the Illinois Senate. He represented Illinois's 38th district during the 40th and 41st general assemblies. He died January 18, 1915.

Dressor, Illinois, an unincorporated settlement in Fayette County, is named for Nathaniel Dressor, who was the original owner of the town site.
