= Lone Grove Township, Fayette County, Illinois =

Lone Grove Township
- Township
- Location in Fayette County

- Fayette County's location in Illinois
- Coordinates: 38°52′03″N 88°51′51″W
- Country: United States
- State: Illinois
- County: Fayette
- Established: September 1876

Area
  - Total: 36.86 sq mi (95.5 km^{2})
  - Land: 36.86 sq mi (95.5 km^{2})
  - Water: 0 sq mi (0 km^{2}) 0%
- Elevation: 587 ft (179 m)

Population (2020)
  - Total: 632
  - Density: 17.1/sq mi (6.62/km^{2})
- Time zone: UTC-6 (CST)
  - Summer (DST): UTC-5 (CDT)
- ZIP codes: 62838, 62857, 62880
- FIPS code: 17-051-44459

Lone Grove Township is one of twenty townships in Fayette County, Illinois, USA. As of the 2020 census, its population was 632 and it contained 262 housing units. This township was formed from LaClede and Wilberton townships in September 1876.

== Geography ==
According to the 2021 census gazetteer files, Lone Grove Township has a total area of 36.86 square miles (95.47 km^{2}), all land.

=== Cities, towns, villages ===
- St. Peter

=== Unincorporated towns ===
- Loogootee
- Saint Peter

(This list is based on USGS data and may include former settlements.)

=== Cemeteries ===
The township contains these four cemeteries: Ambuehl, Harris, New Saint Peter and Old Saint Peter.

=== Major highways ===
- Illinois Route 185

== Demographics ==
As of the 2020 census there were 632 people, 279 households, and 195 families residing in the township. The population density was 17.15 inhabitants per square mile (6.62/km^{2}). There were 262 housing units at an average density of 7.11 per square mile (2.75/km^{2}). The racial makeup of the township was 97.78% White, 0.00% African American, 0.00% Native American, 0.32% Asian, 0.00% Pacific Islander, 0.16% from other races, and 1.74% from two or more races. Hispanic or Latino of any race were 0.47% of the population.

There were 279 households, out of which 26.90% had children under the age of 18 living with them, 64.16% were married couples living together, 5.73% had a female householder with no spouse present, and 30.11% were non-families. 22.90% of all households were made up of individuals, and 18.60% had someone living alone who was 65 years of age or older. The average household size was 2.54 and the average family size was 2.97.

The township's age distribution consisted of 24.7% under the age of 18, 7.1% from 18 to 24, 25.8% from 25 to 44, 14.7% from 45 to 64, and 27.8% who were 65 years of age or older. The median age was 39.4 years. For every 100 females, there were 100.8 males. For every 100 females age 18 and over, there were 93.5 males.

The median income for a household in the township was $57,813, and the median income for a family was $63,528. Males had a median income of $44,375 versus $22,833 for females. The per capita income for the township was $24,298. About 8.2% of families and 11.3% of the population were below the poverty line, including 17.4% of those under age 18 and 3.6% of those age 65 or over.

Historical population
Census	Pop.	Note	%±
2000	725		—
2010	656		−9.5%
2020	632		−3.7%
U.S. Decennial Census

== School districts ==
- Brownstown Community Unit School District 201
- South Central Community Unit School District 401

== Political districts ==
- Illinois' 19th congressional district
- State House District 102
- State Senate District 51
