= Bingham, Illinois =

- Village
- Location of Bingham in Fayette County, Illinois.
- Coordinates: 39°06′44″N 89°12′49″W
- Country: United States
- State: Illinois
- County: Fayette

Area
  - Total: 0.27 sq mi (0.71 km^{2})
  - Land: 0.27 sq mi (0.71 km^{2})
  - Water: 0 sq mi (0.00 km^{2})
- Elevation: 597 ft (182 m)

Population (2020)
  - Total: 60
  - Density: 219.3/sq mi (84.68/km^{2})
- Time zone: UTC-6 (CST)
  - Summer (DST): UTC-5 (CDT)
- Zip code: 62011
- Area code: 618
- FIPS code: 17-06028
- GNIS feature ID: 2398122

Bingham is a village in Fayette County, Illinois, United States. The population was 60 at the 2020 census.

The village was named after Judge Horatio Bingham. A post office was established in 1883 but closed in 2013.

== Geography ==
Bingham is located in northwestern Fayette County within South Hurricane Township. It is 16 miles (26 km) northwest of Vandalia, the county seat.

According to the 2010 census, Bingham has a total area of 0.27 square miles (0.70 km^{2}), all land.

== Demographics ==
Historical population
Census	Pop.	Note	%±
1890	178		—
1900	273		53.4%
1910	191		−30.0%
1920	192		0.5%
1930	144		−25.0%
1940	199		38.2%
1950	170		−14.6%
1960	122		−28.2%
1970	84		−31.1%
1980	128		52.4%
1990	98		−23.4%
2000	117		19.4%
2010	83		−29.1%
2020	60		−27.7%
U.S. Decennial Census

As of the 2020 census there were 60 people, 36 households, and 23 families residing in the village. The population density was 218.98 inhabitants per square mile (84.55/km^{2}). There were 25 housing units at an average density of 91.24 per square mile (35.23/km^{2}). The racial makeup of the village was 91.67% White, 0.00% African American, 1.67% Native American, 0.00% Asian, 0.00% Pacific Islander, 0.00% from other races, and 6.67% from two or more races. Hispanic or Latino of any race were 3.33% of the population.

There were 36 households, out of which 22.2% had children under the age of 18 living with them, 41.67% were married couples living together, 22.22% had a female householder with no husband present, and 36.11% were non-families. 33.33% of all households were made up of individuals, and 13.89% had someone living alone who was 65 years of age or older. The average household size was 2.87 and the average family size was 2.39.

The village's age distribution consisted of 16.3% under the age of 18, 7.0% from 18 to 24, 32.5% from 25 to 44, 24.5% from 45 to 64, and 19.8% who were 65 years of age or older. The median age was 44.0 years. For every 100 females, there were 132.4 males. For every 100 females age 18 and over, there were 125.0 males.

The median income for a household in the village was $44,583, and the median income for a family was $50,938. Males had a median income of $15,000 versus $22,188 for females. The per capita income for the village was $17,507. About 8.7% of families and 17.4% of the population were below the poverty line, including 0.0% of those under age 18 and 0.0% of those age 65 or over.
