= St. Peter, Illinois =

- Village
- Location of St. Peter in Fayette County, Illinois.
- Coordinates: 38°52′03″N 88°51′01″W
- Country: United States
- State: Illinois
- County: Fayette
- Township: Lone Grove

Area
  - Total: 0.52 sq mi (1.35 km^{2})
  - Land: 0.52 sq mi (1.35 km^{2})
  - Water: 0 sq mi (0.00 km^{2})
- Elevation: 591 ft (180 m)

Population (2020)
  - Total: 322
  - Density: 618.5/sq mi (238.81/km^{2})
- Time zone: UTC-6 (CST)
  - Summer (DST): UTC-5 (CDT)
- ZIP code: 62880
- Area code: 618
- FIPS code: 17-67132
- GNIS feature ID: 2399171

St. Peter or Saint Peter is a village in Fayette County, Illinois, United States. The population was 322 at the 2020 census.

== Geography ==
St. Peter is located in southeastern Fayette County. Illinois Route 185 passes through the village, leading northwest 17 miles (27 km) to Vandalia, the county seat, and southeast 6.5 miles (10.5 km) to Farina.

According to the 2021 census gazetteer files, St. Peter has a total area of 0.52 square miles (1.35 km^{2}), all land.

== Demographics ==
Historical population
Census	Pop.	Note	%±
1910	313		—
1920	396		26.5%
1930	251		−36.6%
1940	348		38.6%
1950	354		1.7%
1960	397		12.1%
1970	380		−4.3%
1980	372		−2.1%
1990	353		−5.1%
2000	386		9.3%
2010	359		−7.0%
2020	322		−10.3%
U.S. Decennial Census

As of the 2020 census there were 322 people, 152 households, and 103 families residing in the village. The population density was 618.04 inhabitants per square mile (238.63/km^{2}). There were 144 housing units at an average density of 276.39 per square mile (106.71/km^{2}). The racial makeup of the village was 98.45% White, 0.00% African American, 0.00% Native American, 0.00% Asian, 0.00% Pacific Islander, 0.00% from other races, and 1.55% from two or more races. Hispanic or Latino of any race were 0.31% of the population.

There were 152 households, out of which 36.2% had children under the age of 18 living with them, 57.24% were married couples living together, 10.53% had a female householder with no husband present, and 32.24% were non-families. 25.66% of all households were made up of individuals, and 17.76% had someone living alone who was 65 years of age or older. The average household size was 3.45 and the average family size was 2.88.

The village's age distribution consisted of 33.1% under the age of 18, 5.7% from 18 to 24, 28.5% from 25 to 44, 15.1% from 45 to 64, and 17.6% who were 65 years of age or older. The median age was 32.2 years. For every 100 females, there were 94.7 males. For every 100 females age 18 and over, there were 98.0 males.

The median income for a household in the village was $50,938, and the median income for a family was $58,438. Males had a median income of $39,063 versus $26,875 for females. The per capita income for the village was $21,471. About 15.5% of families and 13.3% of the population were below the poverty line, including 21.1% of those under age 18 and 9.1% of those age 65 or over.
