= John Staff =

American soldier shot by East German guards

- Born: January 14, 1923; Ramsey, Illinois, United States
- Died: November 25, 1949 (aged 26); British Military Hospital, Gatow, West Berlin
- Cause of death: Shot by East German guards and/or a Soviet soldier at the border between Gatow, West Berlin, and Potsdam Bezirk, East Germany
- Resting place: Ramsey, Illinois, United States
- Known for: One of two known Allied soldiers killed at the Border of West Berlin and East German territory during the Occupation of Berlin.

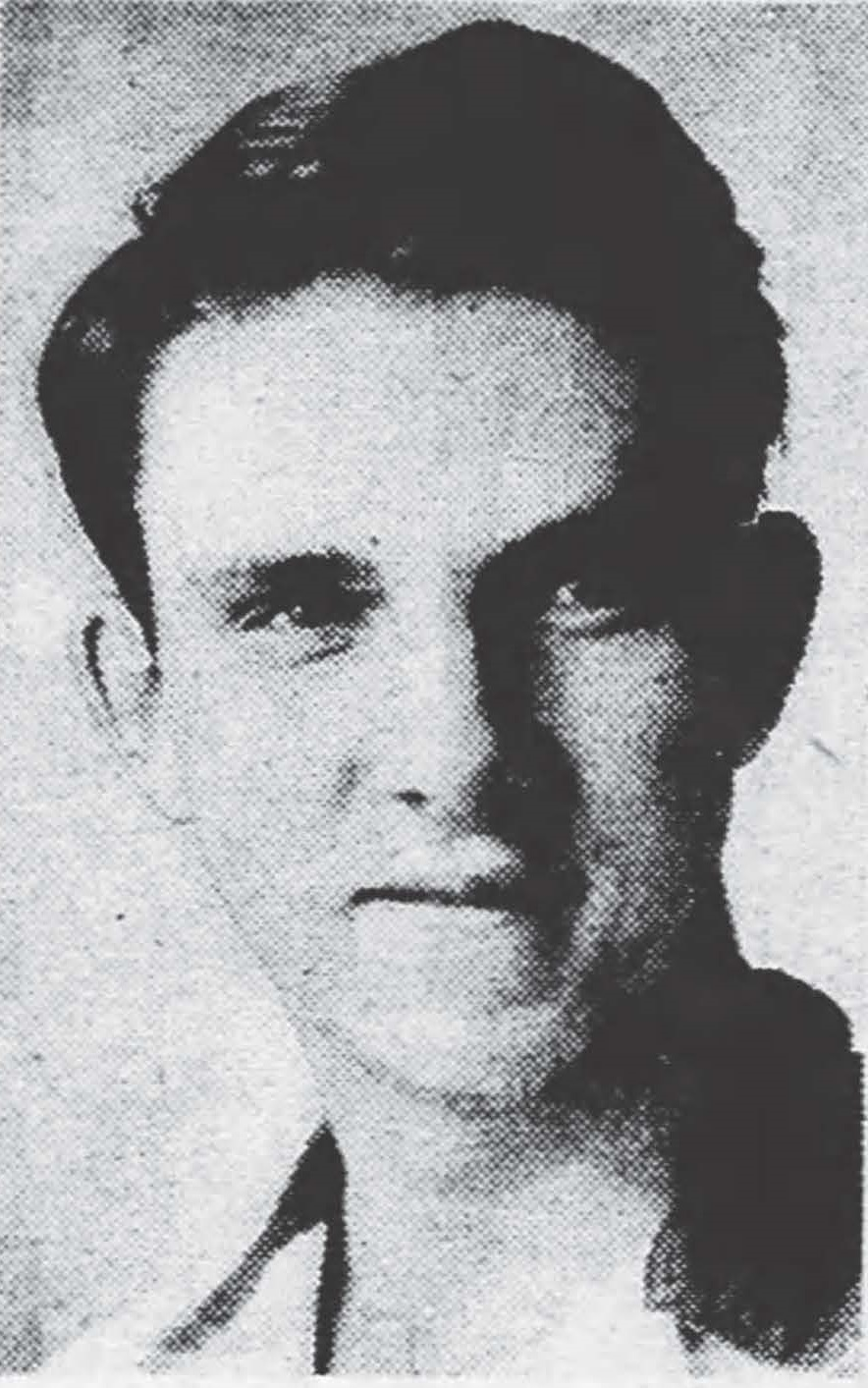
Obituary photo of John E. Staff

Sergeant John Earl Staff (January 14, 1923 – November 25, 1949) was an American soldier. He was one of two known Allied soldiers killed in the line of duty on the border of West Berlin and East German territory between the beginning of the joint occupation of Berlin in summer 1945 and the beginning of the construction of the Berlin Wall on August 13, 1961.

== Death ==
Staff was on a private trip with two other soldiers and two young women. All three soldiers were wearing uniforms, and in an automobile that was clearly marked as an official US Forces vehicle. On the Hauptstraße in Gatow (in the British occupation sector), near the border between West Berlin and the GDR, they got lost; it remained disputed whether or not they were actually in East German territory. Once the occupants realized that they were lost, and attempted to return to Gatow, they were fired upon by two East German border guards and a Soviet soldier who were posted at the nearby East German border checkpoint. Several bullets hit the car, and Staff was severely wounded by a bullet in his head. His friends took him to the military hospital at the British airfield in Gatow, where Staff died a short time later as a result of the shots.

An American newspaper stated that the vehicle had driven up to the checkpoint, clearly in East German territory, so the driver could ask for directions. It stands to reason that the driver overlooked the hazard of the new border, and did not expect the zeal with which the East German guards and the protective power of their Soviet masters defended the sovereignty of the newly established German Democratic Republic, or the unexpected shooting of a clearly marked military vehicle.

== Aftermath ==
The following day, the American Commandant of Berlin, Major General Maxwell D. Taylor, lodged a formal protest with the Soviet Commandant of Berlin, Major General Aleksandr Kotikov, in a letter that he delivered personally to his Soviet counterpart. In his letter, General Maxwell protested the unnecessary brutality against members of the armed forces of a friendly nation. This also punctuated the official attitude of the US Government, which did not recognize the establishment of the GDR or its government, and regarded the Soviet authorities as the only legitimate authority in East Germany.

A few days later, the Deputy Soviet Commandant of Berlin, Colonel Ivan Yelisarov, answered the protest, stating that the soldiers refused to identify themselves, and since the guards were busy with another vehicle, they took the opportunity to flee. The driver ignored warning shots. The border guards had targeted only the tires, and Staff was hit accidentally. This closed the case for the Soviet side.

Coverage of the shooting in Berlin newspapers was very limited, with extremely brief news articles. Coverage of the American protest was broader, probably due to the clear words that General Taylor had used. The meager coverage was initially surprising, but in Berlin in 1949 it was the norm. The Tagesspiegel headlines were devoted to the European Recovery Plan and resources provided by the Marshall Plan for Berlin, diplomatic tensions between France and Poland, and strikes in France initiated by the Communist Union.

On the other hand, coverage of this incident in the American press was much greater. The California-based and Madera Tribune reported on this event far more extensively than the Berlin press just after the event. The Daily Illini and Mt. Vernon Register newspapers in Illinois, Staff's home state, reiterated the Soviet response to Taylor's protest. Nationwide newspapers such as the Pennsylvania-based Sunday Independent and the New York Herald Tribune also reported on the exchange of notes between the two Allied city commanders.

== Burial ==
Staff is buried at the Ramsey Cemetery in his hometown.
