= Saint Paul, Illinois =

- Unincorporated community
- Location within Illinois Location within the United States
- Coordinates: 38°51′10″N 88°57′12″W
- Country: United States
- State: Illinois
- County: Fayette
- Elevation: 571 ft (174 m)
- Time zone: UTC-6 (Central (CST))
  - Summer (DST): UTC-5 (CDT)
- Area code: 618
- GNIS feature ID: 417693

Saint Paul is an unincorporated community in Fayette County, Illinois, United States.
