= Kaskaskia Township, Fayette County, Illinois =

Kaskaskia Township
- Township
- Location in Fayette County

- Fayette County's location in Illinois
- Coordinates: 38°51′57″N 89°05′13″W
- Country: United States
- State: Illinois
- County: Fayette
- Established: November 9, 1859

Area
  - Total: 34.34 sq mi (88.9 km^{2})
  - Land: 34.30 sq mi (88.8 km^{2})
  - Water: 0.04 sq mi (0.10 km^{2}) 0.12%
- Elevation: 515 ft (157 m)

Population (2020)
  - Total: 517
  - Density: 15.1/sq mi (5.82/km^{2})
- Time zone: UTC-6 (CST)
  - Summer (DST): UTC-5 (CDT)
- ZIP codes: 62471, 62885, 62892
- FIPS code: 17-051-39116

Kaskaskia Township is one of twenty townships in Fayette County, Illinois, USA. As of the 2020 census, its population was 517 and it contained 241 housing units.

== Geography ==
According to the 2021 census gazetteer files, Kaskaskia Township has a total area of 34.34 square miles (88.94 km^{2}), of which 34.30 square miles (88.84 km^{2}) or 99.88% is land and 0.04 square miles (0.10 km^{2}) or 0.12% is water.

=== Unincorporated towns ===
- Shobonier

=== Cemeteries ===
The township contains these five cemeteries: Britton, Farmer, Heckethorn, Lee and McConnell.

=== Major highways ===
- US Route 51

== Demographics ==
As of the 2020 census there were 517 people, 170 households, and 84 families residing in the township. The population density was 15.05 inhabitants per square mile (5.81/km^{2}). There were 241 housing units at an average density of 7.02 per square mile (2.71/km^{2}). The racial makeup of the township was 97.49% White, 0.39% African American, 0.19% Native American, 0.00% Asian, 0.00% Pacific Islander, 0.39% from other races, and 1.55% from two or more races. Hispanic or Latino of any race were 0.58% of the population.

There were 170 households, out of which 16.50% had children under the age of 18 living with them, 41.18% were married couples living together, 3.53% had a female householder with no spouse present, and 50.59% were non-families. 35.90% of all households were made up of individuals, and 17.10% had someone living alone who was 65 years of age or older. The average household size was 2.18 and the average family size was 3.04.

The township's age distribution consisted of 18.9% under the age of 18, 3.8% from 18 to 24, 28.4% from 25 to 44, 32.4% from 45 to 64, and 16.5% who were 65 years of age or older. The median age was 43.4 years. For every 100 females, there were 113.9 males. For every 100 females age 18 and over, there were 120.6 males.

The median income for a household in the township was $48,056, and the median income for a family was $60,000. Males had a median income of $50,682 versus $25,000 for females. The per capita income for the township was $25,854. About 17.9% of families and 26.8% of the population were below the poverty line, including 27.1% of those under age 18 and 24.6% of those age 65 or over.

Historical population
Census	Pop.	Note	%±
2000	719		—
2010	650		−9.6%
2020	517		−20.5%
U.S. Decennial Census

== School districts ==
- Patoka Community Unit School District 100
- Vandalia Community Unit School District 203
