= Otego Township, Fayette County, Illinois =

Otego Township
- Township
- Location in Fayette County

- Fayette County's location in Illinois
- Coordinates: 38°57′09″N 88°58′45″W
- Country: United States
- State: Illinois
- County: Fayette
- Established: November 9, 1859

Area
  - Total: 35.42 sq mi (91.7 km^{2})
  - Land: 35.34 sq mi (91.5 km^{2})
  - Water: 0.08 sq mi (0.21 km^{2}) 0.24%
- Elevation: 561 ft (171 m)

Population (2020)
  - Total: 1,445
  - Density: 40.89/sq mi (15.79/km^{2})
- Time zone: UTC-6 (CST)
  - Summer (DST): UTC-5 (CDT)
- ZIP codes: 62418, 62471, 62838, 62857, 62880
- FIPS code: 17-051-56913

Otego Township is one of twenty townships in Fayette County, Illinois, USA. As of the 2020 census, its population was 1,445 and it contained 626 housing units. Its name changed from Cumberland township on September 24, 1860. Overcup Church is located in this township.

== Geography ==
According to the 2021 census gazetteer files, Otego Township has a total area of 35.42 square miles (91.74 km^{2}), of which 35.34 square miles (91.53 km^{2}) (or 99.76%) is land and 0.08 square miles (0.21 km^{2}) (or 0.24%) is water.

=== Cities, towns, villages ===
- Brownstown (south three-quarters)

=== Unincorporated towns ===
- Confidence

(This list is based on USGS data and may include former settlements.)

=== Cemeteries ===
The township contains these six cemeteries: Arm Prairie, Griffith, Mitchell Family, Morton, Pilcher and Winslow Pilcher.

=== Major highways ===
- Interstate 70
- U.S. Route 40
- Illinois Route 185

== Demographics ==
As of the 2020 census there were 1,445 people, 662 households, and 383 families residing in the township. The population density was 40.80 inhabitants per square mile (15.75/km^{2}). There were 626 housing units at an average density of 17.67 per square mile (6.82/km^{2}). The racial makeup of the township was 95.78% White, 0.48% African American, 0.28% Native American, 0.14% Asian, 0.00% Pacific Islander, 0.21% from other races, and 3.11% from two or more races. Hispanic or Latino of any race were 1.25% of the population.

There were 662 households, out of which 23.40% had children under the age of 18 living with them, 41.54% were married couples living together, 8.91% had a female householder with no spouse present, and 42.15% were non-families. 36.00% of all households were made up of individuals, and 21.60% had someone living alone who was 65 years of age or older. The average household size was 2.35 and the average family size was 3.10.

The township's age distribution consisted of 20.1% under the age of 18, 7.8% from 18 to 24, 31.2% from 25 to 44, 20.9% from 45 to 64, and 19.9% who were 65 years of age or older. The median age was 38.6 years. For every 100 females, there were 97.0 males. For every 100 females age 18 and over, there were 77.0 males.

The median income for a household in the township was $45,254, and the median income for a family was $54,583. Males had a median income of $41,442 versus $16,150 for females. The per capita income for the township was $28,911. About 12.5% of families and 19.1% of the population were below the poverty line, including 24.0% of those under age 18 and 8.4% of those age 65 or over.

Historical population
Census	Pop.	Note	%±
2000	1,452		—
2010	1,511		4.1%
2020	1,445		−4.4%
U.S. Decennial Census

== School districts ==
- Brownstown Community Unit School District 201
- Vandalia Community Unit School District 203

== Political districts ==
- Illinois's 19th congressional district
- State House District 102
- State Senate District 51
