= Wheatland Township, Fayette County, Illinois =

Wheatland Township
- Township
- Location in Fayette County

- Fayette County's location in Illinois
- Coordinates: 38°57′21″N 88°51′34″W
- Country: United States
- State: Illinois
- County: Fayette
- Established: November 9, 1859

Area
  - Total: 36.73 sq mi (95.1 km^{2})
  - Land: 36.69 sq mi (95.0 km^{2})
  - Water: 0.04 sq mi (0.10 km^{2}) 0.11%
- Elevation: 584 ft (178 m)

Population (2020)
  - Total: 496
  - Density: 13.5/sq mi (5.22/km^{2})
- Time zone: UTC-6 (CST)
  - Summer (DST): UTC-5 (CDT)
- ZIP codes: 62418, 62458, 62838, 62857, 62880
- FIPS code: 17-051-81022

Wheatland Township is one of twenty townships in Fayette County, Illinois, USA. As of the 2020 census, its population was 496 and it contained 216 housing units.

== Geography ==
According to the 2021 census gazetteer files, Wheatland Township has a total area of 36.73 square miles (95.13 km^{2}), of which 36.69 square miles (95.03 km^{2}) (or 99.90%) is land and 0.04 square miles (0.10 km^{2}) (or 0.10%) is water.

=== Unincorporated towns ===
- Saint James

=== Cemeteries ===
The township contains these five cemeteries: German Reformed, Lovett, Old Loogootee, Sidener and Stein.

=== Major highways ===
- Interstate 70
- Illinois Route 185

== Demographics ==
As of the 2020 census there were 496 people, 195 households, and 173 families residing in the township. The population density was 13.51 inhabitants per square mile (5.22/km^{2}). There were 216 housing units at an average density of 5.88 per square mile (2.27/km^{2}). The racial makeup of the township was 96.57% White, 0.20% African American, 0.20% Native American, 0.40% Asian, 0.00% Pacific Islander, 0.00% from other races, and 2.62% from two or more races. Hispanic or Latino of any race were 0.40% of the population.

There were 195 households, out of which 23.10% had children under the age of 18 living with them, 79.49% were married couples living together, 0.00% had a female householder with no spouse present, and 11.28% were non-families. 11.30% of all households were made up of individuals, and 6.20% had someone living alone who was 65 years of age or older. The average household size was 2.64 and the average family size was 2.78.

The township's age distribution consisted of 24.1% under the age of 18, 6.6% from 18 to 24, 14.9% from 25 to 44, 30.6% from 45 to 64, and 23.9% who were 65 years of age or older. The median age was 46.6 years. For every 100 females, there were 102.4 males. For every 100 females age 18 and over, there were 114.3 males.

The median income for a household in the township was $68,173, and the median income for a family was $69,135. Males had a median income of $28,967 versus $25,104 for females. The per capita income for the township was $28,945. About 6.4% of families and 7.6% of the population were below the poverty line, including 6.5% of those under age 18 and 8.9% of those age 65 or over.

Historical population
| Census | Pop. | Note | %± |
|---|---|---|---|
| 1990 | 510 | | — |
| 2000 | 468 | | −8.2% |
| 2010 | 467 | | −0.2% |
| 2020 | 496 | | 6.2% |
U.S. Decennial Census

== School districts ==
- Brownstown Community Unit School District 201
- Saint Elmo Community Unit School District 202

== Political districts ==
- Illinois' 19th congressional district
- State House District 102
- State Senate District 51
