= Vera, Illinois =

- Unincorporated community
- Location within Illinois
- Coordinates: 39°02′03″N 89°06′47″W
- Country: United States
- State: Illinois
- County: Fayette
- Township: Sharon
- Elevation: 560 ft (170 m)
- ZIP code: 62080

Vera is an unincorporated community in Sharon Township, Fayette County, Illinois, United States.

== History ==
Vera originally was called Bear Creek. The present name, derived from the Spanish or Latin means "true".

== Geography ==
Vera is located at 39°02′03″N 89°06′47″W at an elevation of 558 feet (170 m).
