= Saint James, Illinois =

- Unincorporated community
- Location within Illinois
- Coordinates: 38°57′16″N 088°51′04″W
- Country: United States
- State: Illinois
- County: Fayette
- Township: Wheatland
- Elevation: 604 ft (184 m)
- ZIP code: 62838
- GNIS feature ID: 0417325

Saint James is an unincorporated community in Wheatland Township, Fayette County, Illinois, United States.

== Geography ==
Saint James is located at 38°57′16″N 088°51′04″W, elevated 604 feet.
