= Carson Township, Fayette County, Illinois =

Carson Township
- Township
- Location in Fayette County

- Fayette County's location in Illinois
- Coordinates: 39°08′08″N 89°00′05″W
- Country: United States
- State: Illinois
- County: Fayette

Area
  - Total: 17.83 sq mi (46.2 km^{2})
  - Land: 17.80 sq mi (46.1 km^{2})
  - Water: 0.03 sq mi (0.078 km^{2}) 0.17%
- Elevation: 587 ft (179 m)

Population (2020)
  - Total: 108
  - Density: 6.07/sq mi (2.34/km^{2})
- Time zone: UTC-6 (CST)
  - Summer (DST): UTC-5 (CDT)
- ZIP codes: 62080, 62431
- FIPS code: 17-051-11501

Carson Township is one of twenty townships in Fayette County, Illinois, US. As of the 2010 census, its population was 108 and it contained 58 housing units. This township was formed from Bowling Green Township.

== Geography ==
According to the 2021 census gazetteer files, Carson Township has a total area of 17.83 square miles (46.18 km^{2}), of which 17.80 square miles (46.10 km^{2}) (or 99.83%) is land and 0.03 square miles (0.08 km^{2}) (or 0.17%) is water.

== Demographics ==
As of the 2020 census there were 108 people, 59 households, and 54 families residing in the township. The population density was 6.06 inhabitants per square mile (2.34/km^{2}). There were 58 housing units at an average density of 3.25 per square mile (1.25/km^{2}). The racial makeup of the township was 93.52% White, 0.00% African American, 0.00% Native American, 0.00% Asian, 0.00% Pacific Islander, 0.00% from other races, and 6.48% from two or more races. Hispanic or Latino of any race were 1.85% of the population.

There were 59 households, out of which 42.40% had children under the age of 18 living with them, 91.53% were married couples living together, 0.00% had a female householder with no spouse present, and 8.47% were non-families. 8.50% of all households were made up of individuals, and 0.00% had someone living alone who was 65 years of age or older. The average household size was 2.54 and the average family size was 2.69.

The township's age distribution consisted of 28.7% under the age of 18, 0.0% from 18 to 24, 28.7% from 25 to 44, 33.3% from 45 to 64, and 9.3% who were 65 years of age or older. The median age was 41.6 years. For every 100 females, there were 130.8 males. For every 100 females age 18 and over, there were 122.9 males.

The median income for a household in the township was $100,850, and the median income for a family was $100,600. Males had a median income of $95,400 versus $7,216 for females. The per capita income for the township was $39,416. About 0.0% of families and 0.0% of the population were below the poverty line, including 0.0% of those under age 18 and 0.0% of those age 65 or over.

Historical population
Census	Pop.	Note	%±
2000	148		—
2010	141		−4.7%
2020	108		−23.4%
U.S. Decennial Census

== Political districts ==
- Illinois's 19th congressional district
- State House District 102
- State Senate District 51
