= Bluff City, Fayette County, Illinois =

Bluff City, Illinois
- Unincorporated community
- Location of Bluff City within Illinois Bluff City, Illinois (the United States)
- Coordinates: 38°57′50″N 89°02′47″W
- Country: United States
- State: Illinois
- County: Fayette
- Township: Vandalia
- Elevation: 515 ft (157 m)
- Time zone: UTC-6 (CST)
  - Summer (DST): UTC-5 (CDT)
- ZIP code: 62471
- Area code: 618

Bluff City is an unincorporated community in Fayette County, Illinois, United States. This community is located two miles east of Vandalia on the historic road of U.S. Route 40.

== History ==
The area around this community was said to have one of the largest pre-Columbian Native American settlements. In 1949, Bluff Equipment Inc., a Case IH, Kubota, and Arctic Cat dealership, was founded, and is still located there. In addition, it is rumored that debris from the Chicago Fire of 1871 was dumped near Bluff City. Bluff City was also the home of the Okaw Valley Opry, operated by Bill and Eveyln Oliver for many years.
