= Robert DeBrake =

Robert F. DeBrake
- Born: January 9, 1927
- Died: September 7, 1951 (aged 24); Soviet Military Hospital, Potsdam, Potsdam Bezirk, East Germany
- Cause of death: Gunshot wound
- Resting place: Golden Gate National Cemetery, San Bruno, California, United States
- Known for: One of two known Allied soldiers killed at the Border of West Berlin and East German territory during the Occupation of Berlin.

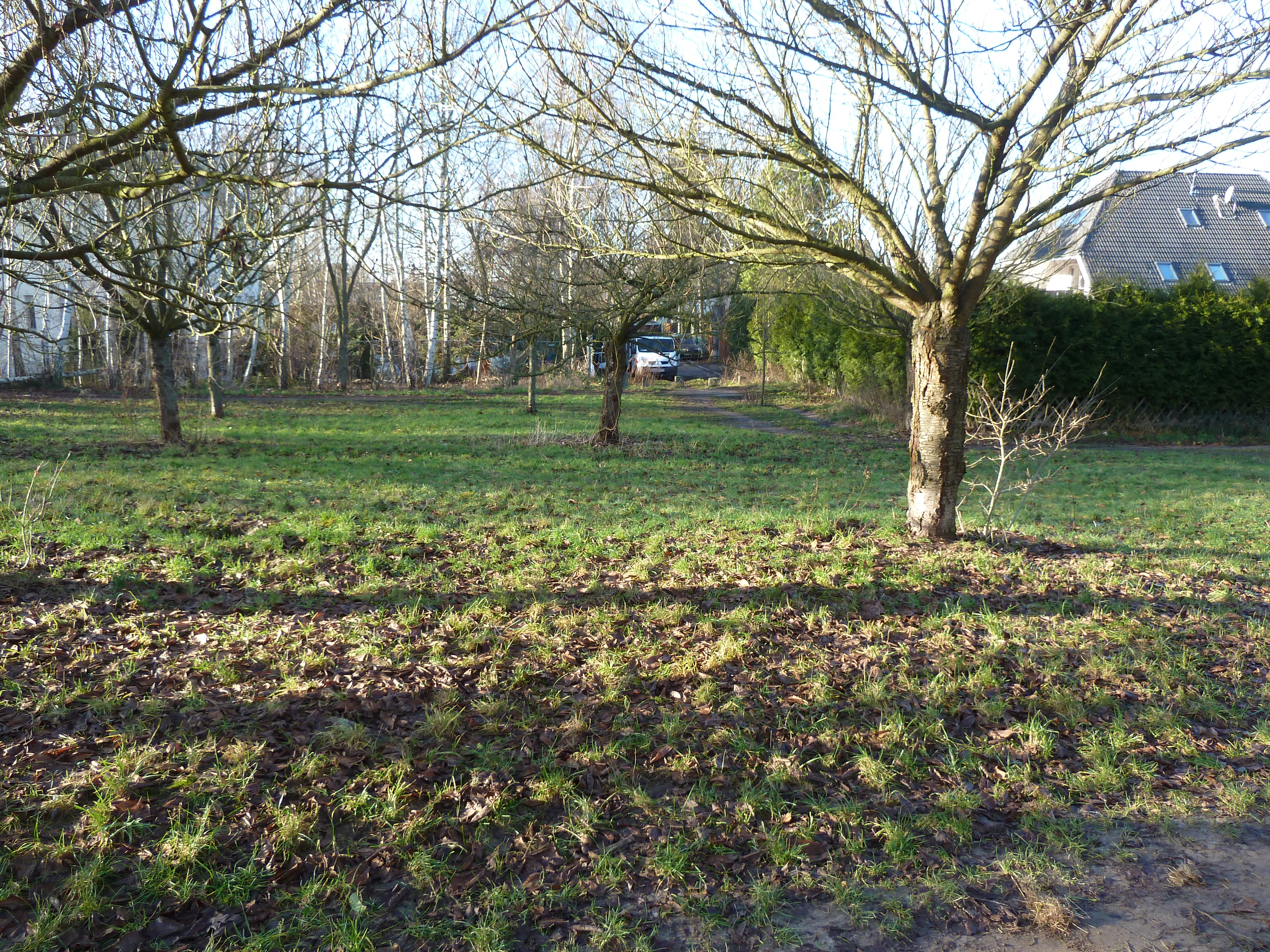
Lessingstraße, in Teltow, as seen from Lichterfelde-Süd, Berlin, east of Lessingstraße (former West Berlin territory). (2017 photo)

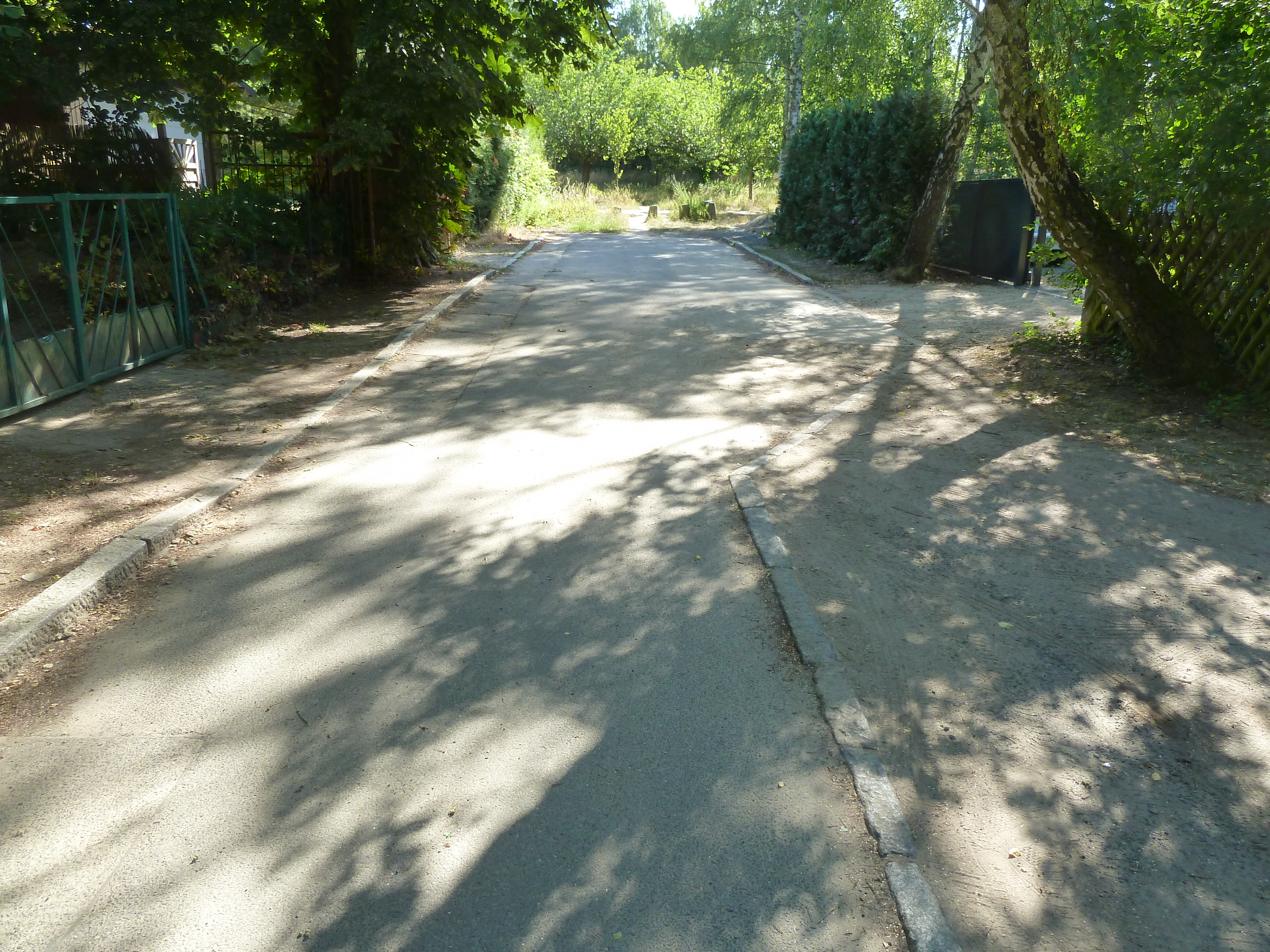
Lessingstraße, in Teltow, as seen from the Teltow side of the former East German border (former East German territory). (2018 photo)

Sergeant Robert F. DeBrake, United States Army (January 9, 1927 – September 7, 1951), was one of two known Allied soldiers killed in the line of duty on the border of West Berlin and East German territory between the beginning of the joint occupation of Berlin in summer 1945 and the beginning of the construction of the Berlin Wall on August 13, 1961 (the other was Sergeant John E. Staff, United States Army).

== Death ==
Sergeant Robert F. DeBrake was shot on the evening of September 6, 1951. He died the following day, on September 7, 1951. Only the statements of three East German border guards, the shooter and his two comrades, were available to conclude what happened on the evening of September 6. At about 8:45 PM, DeBrake crossed the border in his car, coming from Lichterfelde-Süd, the American sector of West Berlin, into the community of Teltow, belonging to East Germany, and approached an East German border police checkpoint on Lessingstraße. One of the border police went to the vehicle, and told the driver to stop, which was ignored. The same border guard said a day later that he had to jump aside, so as not to get run over, and only now noticed that an American soldier in uniform was sitting in the car. He called to him, "Hands up!", and while opening the car door, gestured to him that he was on East German territory. DeBrake replied, as he was closing the car door again, that he was still in West Berlin, and drove on slowly. By now, he was more than 20 meters in East German territory.

DeBrake shouted to the border guard, to say that he should go away or that he would shoot. The East German border guard told him to stop twice more, and then, feeling threatened, while aiming from his hip, fired into the car, which hit DeBrake in the hip area. The sergeant's Mercedes drove on for a few more meters, and crashed into the barrier. With the help of two comrades, the shooter pulled the injured DeBrake out of the car, and provided first aid. Immediately, the command of the Soviet battalion responsible for this section was notified. A little later, Soviet soldiers appeared, first bringing DeBrake to their battalion location in Teltow. DeBrake succumbed to his injuries in the Soviet military hospital in Potsdam the following day.

== Aftermath ==
Half an hour after the shooting, the Criminal Department of the Border Police was called in, which began its investigation at about 9:30 PM. The Ministry for State Security in Potsdam and the Soviet occupation authorities also conducted investigations. A commission of American and Soviet officers found that, on the afternoon of September 7, that DeBrake had actually traveled 42 meters into East German territory. Subsequently, the American officers got the car back.

The investigations of the Criminal Investigation Department of the Border Police were limited to the interrogation of the three border guards present, including the shooter, and a superficial forensic investigation. It was determined that DeBrake was not deliberately drawn into East German territory, but rather it seems as if he had accidentally crossed the badly marked border area, in the dark. No weapon was found on him, so the shooter and the other two border police could not realize that the threat that he was going to shoot was an empty threat, something he could not do. This suggests that DeBrake panicked, and desperately tried not to fall into the hands of the East German police and Soviet authorities. In such cases, Western Allied soldiers had to be prepared to spend several weeks or more in Russian custody.

Immediately after the event, the border police informed the Soviet occupying power, and the same night the Chief of the People's Police and Interior Minister, Karl Maron. In the early hours of September 7, the U.S. Command Berlin sent a telegram to the State Department in Washington regarding the incident at the sector border. The owner of the vehicle had now been identified on the basis of the license plate. Whether the American soldier was still alive, however, had not yet been clarified. Until late in the morning, the Soviet Commissariat officially insisted on not knowing about the incident, even though representatives of the Soviet and American commandants were already present at the scene.

== Burial ==
The following day, the West Berlin daily press reported that DeBrake had succumbed to his injuries. Sergey A. Dengin, the Soviet Commandant of Berlin, expressed his condolences to the US Commandant of Berlin, officially apologizing to him, and assuring him that the gunman was being held accountable. Reportedly from Antioch, California, he was buried at the Golden Gate National Cemetery in San Bruno, California.

A few days after the fatal incident, the District Mayor of Steglitz made sure that the border at the spot in question was clearly marked by white paint, in order to avoid such incidents in the future.
