= Hurricane Township, Fayette County, Illinois =

North Hurricane Township
- Township
- Location in Fayette County

- Fayette County's location in Illinois
- Coordinates: 39°11′05″N 89°11′59″W
- Country: United States
- State: Illinois
- County: Fayette

Area
  - Total: 27.04 sq mi (70.0 km^{2})
  - Land: 27.02 sq mi (70.0 km^{2})
  - Water: 0.03 sq mi (0.078 km^{2}) 0.09%
- Elevation: 650 ft (198 m)

Population (2020)
  - Total: 222
  - Density: 8.22/sq mi (3.17/km^{2})
- Time zone: UTC-6 (CST)
  - Summer (DST): UTC-5 (CDT)
- ZIP codes: 62011, 62075, 62080
- GNIS feature ID: 429159
- FIPS code: 17-051-36802

Hurricane Township is one of twenty townships in Fayette County, Illinois, USA. As of the 2020 census, its population was 222 and it contained 93 housing units. The township achieved its current shape after South Hurricane Township split from it sometime after 1921.

== Geography ==
According to the 2021 census gazetteer files, Hurricane Township has a total area of 27.04 square miles (70.03 km^{2}), of which 27.02 square miles (69.98 km^{2}) (or 99.91%) is land and 0.03 square miles (0.08 km^{2}) (or 0.09%) is water.

=== Cemeteries ===
The township contains these six cemeteries: Casey, Craig, Halford, Little Hickory, Mount Carmel and Stokes.

=== Landmarks ===
- Ramsey Lake State Recreation Area (west quarter)

== Demographics ==
As of the 2020 census there were 222 people, 71 households, and 68 families residing in the township. The population density was 8.21 inhabitants per square mile (3.17/km^{2}). There were 93 housing units at an average density of 3.44 per square mile (1.33/km^{2}). The racial makeup of the township was 96.40% White, 0.00% African American, 0.45% Native American, 0.00% Asian, 0.00% Pacific Islander, 0.00% from other races, and 3.15% from two or more races. Hispanic or Latino of any race were 0.00% of the population.

There were 71 households, out of which 63.40% had children under the age of 18 living with them, 63.38% were married couples living together, 15.49% had a female householder with no spouse present, and 4.23% were non-families. 0.00% of all households were made up of individuals, and 0.00% had someone living alone who was 65 years of age or older. The average household size was 3.48 and the average family size was 3.54.

The township's age distribution consisted of 36.8% under the age of 18, 0.0% from 18 to 24, 17.4% from 25 to 44, 15.8% from 45 to 64, and 30.0% who were 65 years of age or older. The median age was 37.5 years. For every 100 females, there were 80.3 males. For every 100 females age 18 and over, there were 92.6 males.

The median income for a household in the township was $35,919, and the median income for a family was $35,809. The per capita income for the township was $9,968. About 33.8% of families and 42.5% of the population were below the poverty line, including 53.8% of those under age 18 and 44.6% of those age 65 or over.

Historical population
Census	Pop.	Note	%±
2000	247		—
2010	257		4.0%
2020	222		−13.6%

== School districts ==
- Nokomis Community Unit School District 22
- Ramsey Community Unit School District 204

== Political districts ==
- Illinois' 17th congressional district
- State House District 98
- State Senate District 49
