= Sharon Township, Fayette County, Illinois =

Sharon Township
- Township
- Location in Fayette County

- Fayette County's location in Illinois
- Coordinates: 39°02′42″N 89°05′51″W
- Country: United States
- State: Illinois
- County: Fayette
- Established: November 9, 1859

Area
  - Total: 25.17 sq mi (65.2 km^{2})
  - Land: 24.77 sq mi (64.2 km^{2})
  - Water: 0.4 sq mi (1.0 km^{2}) 1.59%
- Elevation: 660 ft (200 m)

Population (2020)
  - Total: 2,968
  - Density: 119.8/sq mi (46.26/km^{2})
- Time zone: UTC-6 (CST)
  - Summer (DST): UTC-5 (CDT)
- ZIP codes: 62080, 62471
- FIPS code: 17-051-69017

Sharon Township is one of twenty townships in Fayette County, Illinois, USA. As of the 2020 census, its population was 2,968 and it contained 398 housing units.

== Geography ==
According to the 2021 census gazetteer files, Sharon Township has a total area of 25.17 square miles (65.19 km^{2}), of which 24.77 square miles (64.15 km^{2}) (or 98.41%) is land and 0.40 square miles (1.04 km^{2}) (or 1.59%) is water.

=== Cities, towns, villages ===
- Vandalia (north quarter)

=== Unincorporated towns ===
- Vera

=== Cemeteries ===
The township contains these three cemeteries: Independence, Sharon and Union.

=== Major highways ===
- US Route 51
- Illinois Route 185

=== Landmarks ===
- Vandalia Correctional Center (north quarter)

=== Lakes ===
- Vandalia Lake

== Demographics ==
As of the 2020 census there were 2,968 people, 281 households, and 222 families residing in the township. The population density was 117.92 inhabitants per square mile (45.53/km^{2}). There were 398 housing units at an average density of 15.81 per square mile (6.10/km^{2}). The racial makeup of the township was 70.08% White, 23.72% African American, 1.68% Native American, 0.13% Asian, 0.00% Pacific Islander, 3.74% from other races, and 0.64% from two or more races. Hispanic or Latino of any race were 13.27% of the population.

There were 281 households, out of which 38.80% had children under the age of 18 living with them, 75.80% were married couples living together, 3.20% had a female householder with no spouse present, and 21.00% were non-families. 13.20% of all households were made up of individuals, and 8.50% had someone living alone who was 65 years of age or older. The average household size was 3.34 and the average family size was 3.76.

The township's age distribution consisted of 9.9% under the age of 18, 15.8% from 18 to 24, 35.4% from 25 to 44, 33.1% from 45 to 64, and 5.8% who were 65 years of age or older. The median age was 36.1 years. For every 100 females, there were 333.5 males. For every 100 females age 18 and over, there were 399.8 males.

The median income for a household in the township was $90,813, and the median income for a family was $100,000. Males had a median income of $40,167 versus $30,682 for females. The per capita income for the township was $14,375. About 7.7% of families and 10.1% of the population were below the poverty line, including 15.0% of those under age 18 and 13.6% of those age 65 or over.

Historical population
Census	Pop.	Note	%±
2000	970		—
2010	2,441		151.6%
2020	2,968		21.6%
U.S. Decennial Census

== School districts ==
- Ramsey Community Unit School District 204
- Vandalia Community Unit School District 203

== Political districts ==
- Illinois' 19th congressional district
- State House District 102
- State Senate District 51
