= Seminary Township, Fayette County, Illinois =

Seminary Township
- Township
- Location in Fayette County

- Fayette County's location in Illinois
- Coordinates: 38°51′23″N 89°12′12″W
- Country: United States
- State: Illinois
- County: Fayette
- Established: November 9, 1859

Area
  - Total: 46.87 sq mi (121.4 km^{2})
  - Land: 44.92 sq mi (116.3 km^{2})
  - Water: 1.95 sq mi (5.1 km^{2}) 4.16%
- Elevation: 486 ft (148 m)

Population (2020)
  - Total: 482
  - Density: 10.7/sq mi (4.14/km^{2})
- Time zone: UTC-6 (CST)
  - Summer (DST): UTC-5 (CDT)
- ZIP codes: 62253, 62262 62471
- FIPS code: 17-051-68601

Seminary Township is one of twenty townships in Fayette County, Illinois, USA. As of the 2020 census, its population was 482 and it contained 229 housing units.

== Geography ==
According to the 2021 census gazetteer files, Seminary Township has a total area of 46.87 square miles (121.39 km^{2}), of which 44.92 square miles (116.34 km^{2}) (or 95.84%) is land and 1.95 square miles (5.05 km^{2}) (or 4.16%) is water.

=== Extinct towns ===
- Pittsburg

=== Cemeteries ===
The township contains these five cemeteries: Collier, Daniel, Seminary, Taylor and Williams.

=== Major highways ===
- Interstate 70

=== Lakes ===
- Fish Lake

== Demographics ==
As of the 2020 census there were 482 people, 264 households, and 180 families residing in the township. The population density was 10.28 inhabitants per square mile (3.97/km^{2}). There were 229 housing units at an average density of 4.89 per square mile (1.89/km^{2}). The racial makeup of the township was 97.72% White, 0.41% African American, 0.21% Native American, 0.00% Asian, 0.00% Pacific Islander, 0.00% from other races, and 1.66% from two or more races. Hispanic or Latino of any race were 0.41% of the population.

There were 264 households, out of which 9.80% had children under the age of 18 living with them, 60.61% were married couples living together, 4.55% had a female householder with no spouse present, and 31.82% were non-families. 31.80% of all households were made up of individuals, and 17.00% had someone living alone who was 65 years of age or older. The average household size was 1.84 and the average family size was 2.21.

The township's age distribution consisted of 5.7% under the age of 18, 5.5% from 18 to 24, 6.4% from 25 to 44, 38.5% from 45 to 64, and 43.9% who were 65 years of age or older. The median age was 61.1 years. For every 100 females, there were 128.6 males. For every 100 females age 18 and over, there were 122.8 males.

The median income for a household in the township was $32,090, and the median income for a family was $31,926. Males had a median income of $49,063 versus $37,569 for females. The per capita income for the township was $31,030. About 2.2% of families and 3.7% of the population were below the poverty line, including 0.0% of those under age 18 and 6.1% of those age 65 or over.

Historical population
Census	Pop.	Note	%±
2000	457		—
2010	498		9.0%
2020	482		−3.2%
U.S. Decennial Census

== School districts ==
- Mulberry Grove Community Unit School District 1
- Patoka Community Unit School District 100
- Vandalia Community Unit School District 203

== Political districts ==
- Illinois' 19th congressional district
- State House District 102
- State House District 107
- State Senate District 51
- State Senate District 54
