= Vandalia Township, Fayette County, Illinois =

Vandalia Township
- Township
- Location in Fayette County

- Fayette County's location in Illinois
- Coordinates: 38°57′20″N 89°05′16″W
- Country: United States
- State: Illinois
- County: Fayette
- Established: November 9, 1859

Area
  - Total: 35.37 sq mi (91.6 km^{2})
  - Land: 35.08 sq mi (90.9 km^{2})
  - Water: 0.29 sq mi (0.75 km^{2}) 0.82%
- Elevation: 460 ft (140 m)

Population (2020)
  - Total: 6,364
  - Density: 181.4/sq mi (70.04/km^{2})
- Time zone: UTC-6 (CST)
  - Summer (DST): UTC-5 (CDT)
- ZIP codes: 62418, 62471, 62885
- FIPS code: 17-051-77330

Vandalia Township is one of twenty townships in Fayette County, Illinois, USA. As of the 2020 census, its population was 6,364 and it contained 3,069 housing units.

== Geography ==
According to the 2021 census gazetteer files, Vandalia Township has a total area of 35.37 square miles (91.61 km^{2}), of which 35.08 square miles (90.86 km^{2}) (or 99.18%) is land and 0.29 square miles (0.75 km^{2}) (or 0.82%) is water.

=== Cities, towns, villages ===
- Vandalia (southeast three-quarters)

=== Unincorporated towns ===
- Bluff City

=== Extinct towns ===
- Pinhook
- Pope

=== Cemeteries ===
The township contains these eight cemeteries: Fairlawn, Haley Chapel, Mother of Dolors, Old State Burial Ground, Pinhook, Ritter, South Hill and Vandalia City.

=== Major highways ===
- Interstate 70
- U.S. Route 40
- U.S. Route 51
- Illinois Route 140
- Illinois Route 185

=== Rivers ===
- Kaskaskia River

=== Landmarks ===
- Kelley Park
- Vandalia Correctional Center (south three-quarters)

== Demographics ==
As of the 2020 census there were 6,364 people, 2,714 households, and 1,559 families residing in the township. The population density was 179.92 inhabitants per square mile (69.47/km^{2}). There were 3,069 housing units at an average density of 86.76 per square mile (33.50/km^{2}). The racial makeup of the township was 93.54% White, 1.07% African American, 0.24% Native American, 0.66% Asian, 0.00% Pacific Islander, 0.69% from other races, and 3.80% from two or more races. Hispanic or Latino of any race were 2.17% of the population.

There were 2,714 households, out of which 27.30% had children under the age of 18 living with them, 43.66% were married couples living together, 9.29% had a female householder with no spouse present, and 42.56% were non-families. 37.60% of all households were made up of individuals, and 18.50% had someone living alone who was 65 years of age or older. The average household size was 2.29 and the average family size was 2.99.

The township's age distribution consisted of 20.1% under the age of 18, 8.5% from 18 to 24, 24.7% from 25 to 44, 26.1% from 45 to 64, and 20.7% who were 65 years of age or older. The median age was 40.8 years. For every 100 females, there were 97.4 males. For every 100 females age 18 and over, there were 91.9 males.

The median income for a household in the township was $36,990, and the median income for a family was $51,547. Males had a median income of $28,929 versus $24,934 for females. The per capita income for the township was $21,968. About 16.7% of families and 20.9% of the population were below the poverty line, including 19.8% of those under age 18 and 13.9% of those age 65 or over.

Historical population
Census	Pop.	Note	%±
1990	6,339		—
2000	8,108		27.9%
2010	6,629		−18.2%
2020	6,364		−4.0%
U.S. Decennial Census

== School districts ==
- Brownstown Community Unit School District 201
- Vandalia Community Unit School District 203

== Political districts ==
- Illinois' 19th congressional district
- State House District 102
- State Senate District 51
