= Ramsey Township, Fayette County, Illinois =

Ramsey Township
- Township
- Location in Fayette County

- Fayette County's location in Illinois
- Coordinates: 39°09′11″N 89°04′40″W
- Country: United States
- State: Illinois
- County: Fayette
- Established: November 9, 1859

Area
  - Total: 54.49 sq mi (141.1 km^{2})
  - Land: 54.37 sq mi (140.8 km^{2})
  - Water: 0.13 sq mi (0.34 km^{2}) 0.23%
- Elevation: 594 ft (181 m)

Population (2020)
  - Total: 1,665
  - Density: 30.62/sq mi (11.82/km^{2})
- Time zone: UTC-6 (CST)
  - Summer (DST): UTC-5 (CDT)
- ZIP codes: 62080, 62431
- FIPS code: 17-051-62640

Ramsey Township is one of 20 townships in Fayette County, Illinois, USA. As of the 2020 census, its population was 1,665 and it contained 747 housing units.

== Geography ==
According to the 2021 census gazetteer files, Ramsey Township has a total area of 54.49 square miles (141.13 km^{2}), of which 54.37 square miles (140.82 km^{2}) (or 99.77%) is land and 0.13 square miles (0.34 km^{2}) (or 0.23%) is water.

=== Cities, towns, villages ===
- Ramsey

=== Extinct towns ===
- Dressor

=== Cemeteries ===
The township contains these ten cemeteries: Bolt, Bolyard, Cothern Family, Hayes, Mathias, Monclovia, Mount Pleasant, Prater, Saint Josephs and Shedd.

=== Major highways ===
- US Route 51

=== Lakes ===
- Ramsey Lake

=== Landmarks ===
- Ramsey Lake State Recreation Area (east three-quarters)

== Demographics ==
As of the 2020 census there were 1,665 people, 597 households, and 410 families residing in the township. The population density was 30.56 inhabitants per square mile (11.80/km^{2}). There were 747 housing units at an average density of 13.71 per square mile (5.29/km^{2}). The racial makeup of the township was 96.46% White, 0.18% African American, 0.18% Native American, 0.06% Asian, 0.00% Pacific Islander, 0.18% from other races, and 2.94% from two or more races. Hispanic or Latino of any race were 1.08% of the population.

There were 597 households, out of which 26.60% had children under the age of 18 living with them, 53.77% were married couples living together, 9.55% had a female householder with no spouse present, and 31.32% were non-families. 23.10% of all households were made up of individuals, and 13.70% had someone living alone who was 65 years of age or older. The average household size was 2.56 and the average family size was 3.02.

The township's age distribution consisted of 21.0% under the age of 18, 11.7% from 18 to 24, 20.5% from 25 to 44, 26.9% from 45 to 64, and 19.8% who were 65 years of age or older. The median age was 42.4 years. For every 100 females, there were 90.2 males. For every 100 females age 18 and over, there were 86.9 males.

The median income for a household in the township was $39,208, and the median income for a family was $60,833. Males had a median income of $37,656 versus $22,692 for females. The per capita income for the township was $24,720. About 10.7% of families and 15.8% of the population were below the poverty line, including 13.8% of those under age 18 and 16.5% of those age 65 or over.

Historical population
Census	Pop.	Note	%±
2000	1,953		—
2010	1,851		−5.2%
2020	1,665		−10.0%
U.S. Decennial Census

== School districts ==
- Cowden-Herrick Community Unit School District 3a
- Ramsey Community Unit School District 204

== Political districts ==
- Illinois' 17th congressional district
- State House District 98
- State House District 102
- State Senate District 49
- State Senate District 51
