= Loogootee, Illinois =

- Unincorporated community
- Location within Illinois Location within the United States
- Coordinates: 38°54′17″N 88°51′13″W
- Country: United States
- State: Illinois
- County: Fayette
- Township: Lone Grove
- Elevation: 604 ft (184 m)
- Time zone: UTC-6 (Central (CST))
  - Summer (DST): UTC-5 (CDT)
- Area code: 618
- GNIS feature ID: 412622

Loogootee is an unincorporated community in Fayette County, Illinois, United States. Loogootee is located along a railroad line 3 miles (4.8 km) north of St. Peter. Loogootee had a post office, which closed on June 17, 2011.
