= Ramsey, Illinois =

- Village
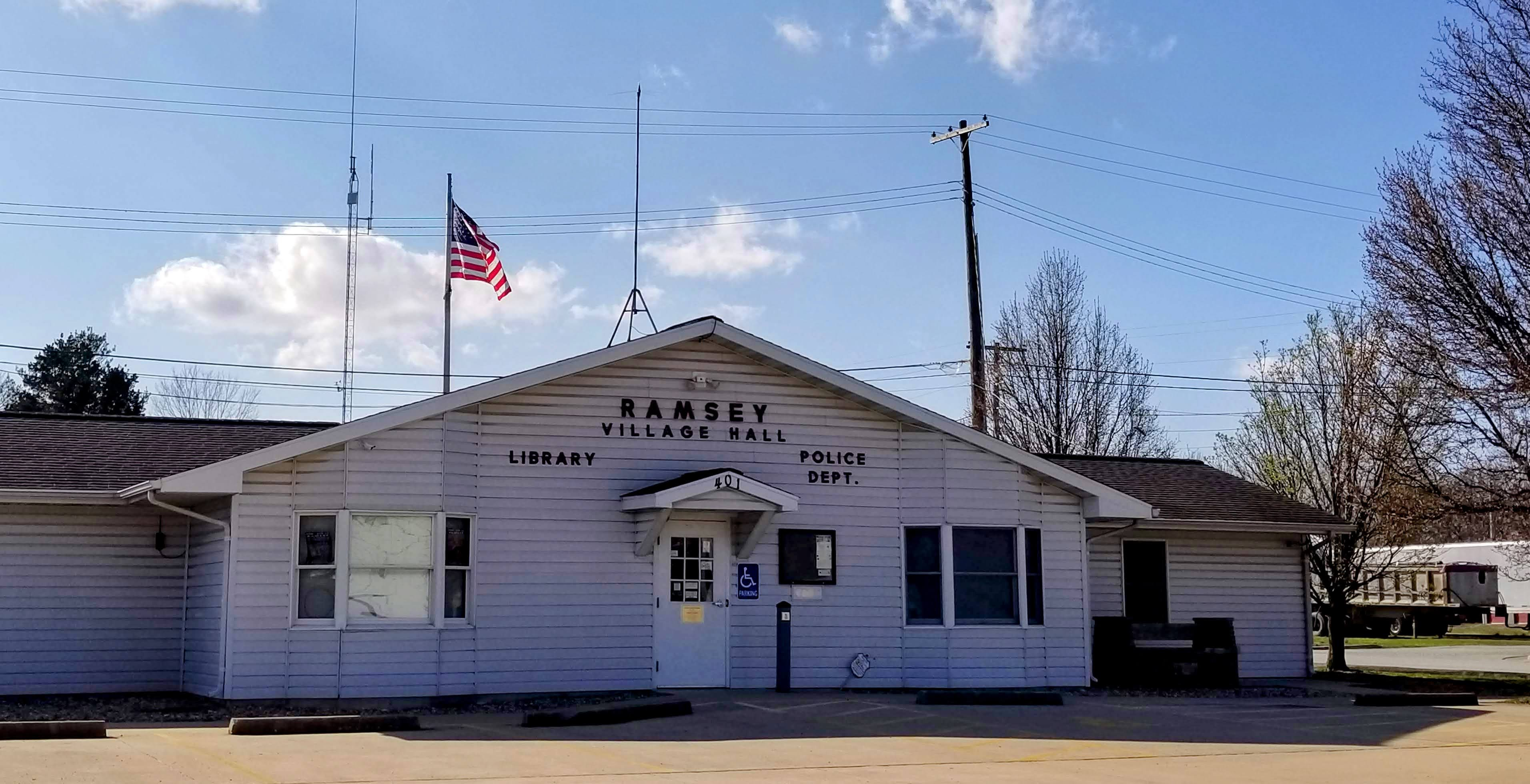
- Ramsey village hall

- Location of Ramsey in Fayette County, Illinois.
- Coordinates: 39°08′44″N 89°06′37″W
- Country: United States
- State: Illinois
- County: Fayette
- Township: Ramsey

Area
  - Total: 1.11 sq mi (2.88 km^{2})
  - Land: 1.11 sq mi (2.88 km^{2})
  - Water: 0 sq mi (0.00 km^{2})
- Elevation: 614 ft (187 m)

Population (2020)
  - Total: 911
  - Density: 819.7/sq mi (316.49/km^{2})
- Time zone: UTC-6 (CST)
  - Summer (DST): UTC-5 (CDT)
- ZIP code: 62080
- Area code: 618
- FIPS code: 17-62627
- GNIS feature ID: 2399038
- Website: www.ramseyillinois.com

Ramsey is a village in Fayette County, Illinois, United States. The population was 911 as of the 2020 census.

The village was named after Alexander Ramsey (1815–1903), an American politician, second governor of Minnesota.

== Geography ==
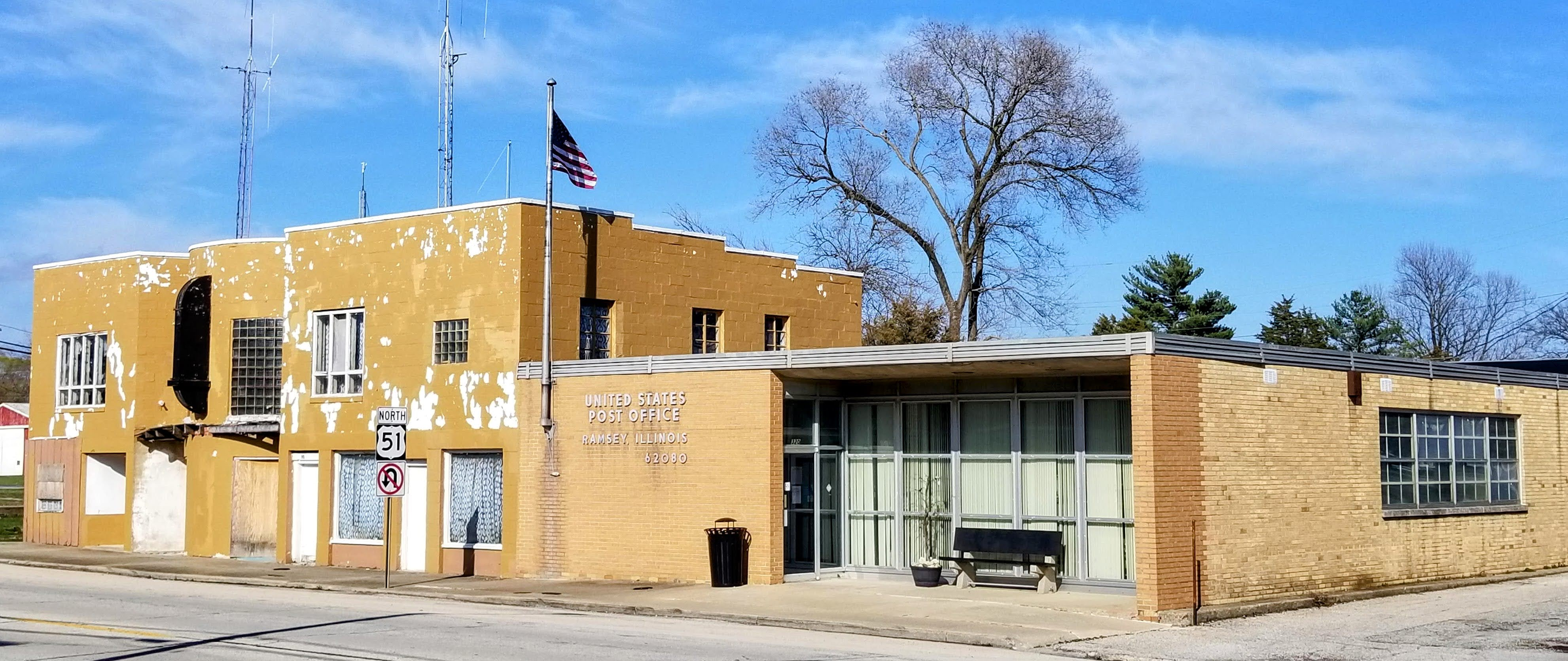
Ramsey post office

U.S. Route 51 passes through the center of town, leading north 17 miles (27 km) to Pana and south 13 miles (21 km) to Vandalia, the county seat.

According to the 2021 census gazetteer files, Ramsey has a total area of 1.11 square miles (2.87 km^{2}), of which 1.11 square miles (2.87 km^{2}) (or 100.00%) is land and 0.00 square miles (0.00 km^{2}) (or 0.00%) is water.

=== Climate ===
Climate data for Ramsey, Illinois (1991–2020)
Month	Jan	Feb	Mar	Apr	May	Jun	Jul	Aug	Sep	Oct	Nov	Dec	Year
Mean daily maximum °F (°C)	35.0 (1.7)	40.2 (4.6)	51.0 (10.6)	63.7 (17.6)	73.4 (23.0)	82.2 (27.9)	85.4 (29.7)	84.5 (29.2)	79.0 (26.1)	66.6 (19.2)	51.6 (10.9)	39.8 (4.3)	62.7 (17.1)
Daily mean °F (°C)	26.9 (−2.8)	31.3 (−0.4)	41.2 (5.1)	52.6 (11.4)	63.0 (17.2)	71.9 (22.2)	75.0 (23.9)	73.2 (22.9)	66.3 (19.1)	54.5 (12.5)	42.0 (5.6)	31.9 (−0.1)	52.5 (11.4)
Mean daily minimum °F (°C)	18.9 (−7.3)	22.4 (−5.3)	31.4 (−0.3)	41.6 (5.3)	52.6 (11.4)	61.5 (16.4)	64.6 (18.1)	61.9 (16.6)	53.7 (12.1)	42.4 (5.8)	32.4 (0.2)	24.1 (−4.4)	42.3 (5.7)
Average precipitation inches (mm)	2.84 (72)	2.17 (55)	3.11 (79)	4.59 (117)	4.75 (121)	4.57 (116)	4.06 (103)	3.57 (91)	3.16 (80)	3.55 (90)	3.44 (87)	2.68 (68)	42.49 (1,079)
Average snowfall inches (cm)	3.6 (9.1)	4.4 (11)	1.6 (4.1)	0.3 (0.76)	0.0 (0.0)	0.0 (0.0)	0.0 (0.0)	0.0 (0.0)	0.0 (0.0)	0.0 (0.0)	0.5 (1.3)	2.4 (6.1)	12.8 (32.36)
Source: NOAA

== Demographics ==
Historical population
Census	Pop.	Note	%±
1880	376		—
1890	598		59.0%
1900	747		24.9%
1910	769		2.9%
1920	772		0.4%
1930	807		4.5%
1940	881		9.2%
1950	808		−8.3%
1960	815		0.9%
1970	830		1.8%
1980	1,058		27.5%
1990	963		−9.0%
2000	1,056		9.7%
2010	1,037		−1.8%
2020	911		−12.2%
U.S. Decennial Census

As of the 2020 census there were 911 people, 332 households, and 208 families residing in the village. The population density was 819.98 inhabitants per square mile (316.60/km^{2}). There were 426 housing units at an average density of 383.44 per square mile (148.05/km^{2}). The racial makeup of the village was 95.83% White, 0.33% African American, 0.33% Native American, 0.00% Asian, 0.00% Pacific Islander, 0.11% from other races, and 3.40% from two or more races. Hispanic or Latino of any race were 1.10% of the population.

There were 332 households, out of which 31.9% had children under the age of 18 living with them, 38.25% were married couples living together, 17.17% had a female householder with no husband present, and 37.35% were non-families. 24.10% of all households were made up of individuals, and 10.24% had someone living alone who was 65 years of age or older. The average household size was 3.11 and the average family size was 2.62.

The village's age distribution consisted of 23.5% under the age of 18, 11.8% from 18 to 24, 23.5% from 25 to 44, 23.8% from 45 to 64, and 17.5% who were 65 years of age or older. The median age was 38.6 years. For every 100 females, there were 78.9 males. For every 100 females age 18 and over, there were 77.6 males.

The median income for a household in the village was $31,875, and the median income for a family was $52,917. Males had a median income of $31,042 versus $23,077 for females. The per capita income for the village was $22,526. About 14.9% of families and 19.8% of the population were below the poverty line, including 14.9% of those under age 18 and 17.1% of those age 65 or over.

== Notable people ==
- Glen Hobbie, baseball player, resident of Ramsey at the time of his death in 2013
- H. L. Hunt, oil tycoon, inspired the 1980s television series Dallas, born near Ramsey
- John Staff, Sergeant of the US Army, shot in Berlin by East German police on November 25, 1949; born in Ramsey
- Tex Williams, country and swing musician ("Smoke! Smoke! Smoke! (That Cigarette)"), born in Ramsey
