= Loudon Township, Fayette County, Illinois =

Loudon Township
- Township
- Location in Fayette County

- Fayette County's location in Illinois
- Coordinates: 39°08′26″N 88°52′19″W
- Country: United States
- State: Illinois
- County: Fayette
- Established: November 9, 1859

Area
  - Total: 59.84 sq mi (155.0 km^{2})
  - Land: 59.80 sq mi (154.9 km^{2})
  - Water: 0.04 sq mi (0.10 km^{2}) 0.07%
- Elevation: 600 ft (183 m)

Population (2020)
  - Total: 881
  - Density: 14.7/sq mi (5.69/km^{2})
- Time zone: UTC-6 (CST)
  - Summer (DST): UTC-5 (CDT)
- ZIP codes: 62080, 62411, 62414, 62418, 62458
- FIPS code: 17-051-44901

Loudon Township is one of twenty townships in Fayette County, Illinois, USA. As of the 2020 census, its population was 881 and it contained 394 housing units.

== Geography ==
According to the 2021 census gazetteer files, Loudon Township has a total area of 59.84 square miles (154.98 km^{2}), of which 59.80 square miles (154.88 km^{2}) (or 99.93%) is land and 0.04 square miles (0.10 km^{2}) (or 0.07%) is water.

=== Extinct towns ===
- Greenland
- Magnolia Corner
- Post Oak
- Wrights Corner
- Bob Doane

=== Cemeteries ===
The township contains these nine cemeteries: Bob Doan, Dial, Dunkard, Mount Moriah, Post Oak, Ransom, Rhodes Family, Rogers and Springhill.

=== Major highways ===
- Illinois Route 33
- Illinois Route 128

== Demographics ==
As of the 2020 census there were 881 people, 355 households, and 245 families residing in the township. The population density was 14.72 inhabitants per square mile (5.68/km^{2}). There were 394 housing units at an average density of 6.58 per square mile (2.54/km^{2}). The racial makeup of the township was 97.16% White, 0.23% African American, 0.00% Native American, 0.11% Asian, 0.00% Pacific Islander, 0.11% from other races, and 2.38% from two or more races. Hispanic or Latino of any race were 1.02% of the population.

There were 355 households, out of which 37.50% had children under the age of 18 living with them, 49.86% were married couples living together, 10.99% had a female householder with no spouse present, and 30.99% were non-families. 28.70% of all households were made up of individuals, and 22.30% had someone living alone who was 65 years of age or older. The average household size was 2.80 and the average family size was 3.35.

The township's age distribution consisted of 25.8% under the age of 18, 5.0% from 18 to 24, 27% from 25 to 44, 21% from 45 to 64, and 21.1% who were 65 years of age or older. The median age was 38.9 years. For every 100 females, there were 86.5 males. For every 100 females age 18 and over, there were 89.7 males.

The median income for a household in the township was $46,938, and the median income for a family was $72,639. Males had a median income of $46,750 versus $22,063 for females. The per capita income for the township was $21,590. About 8.6% of families and 11.6% of the population were below the poverty line, including 12.9% of those under age 18 and 3.8% of those age 65 or over.

Historical population
Census	Pop.	Note	%±
2000	661		—
2010	954		44.3%
2020	881		−7.7%
U.S. Decennial Census

== School districts ==
- Beecher City Community Unit School District 20
- Brownstown Community Unit School District 201
- Cowden-Herrick Community Unit School District 3a
- Ramsey Community Unit School District 204
- St Elmo Community Unit School District 202

== Political districts ==
- Illinois' 19th congressional district
- State House District 102
- State Senate District 51
