= Vandalia State House State Historic Site =

- Vandalia State House
- U.S. National Register of Historic Places
- Illinois State Historic Site
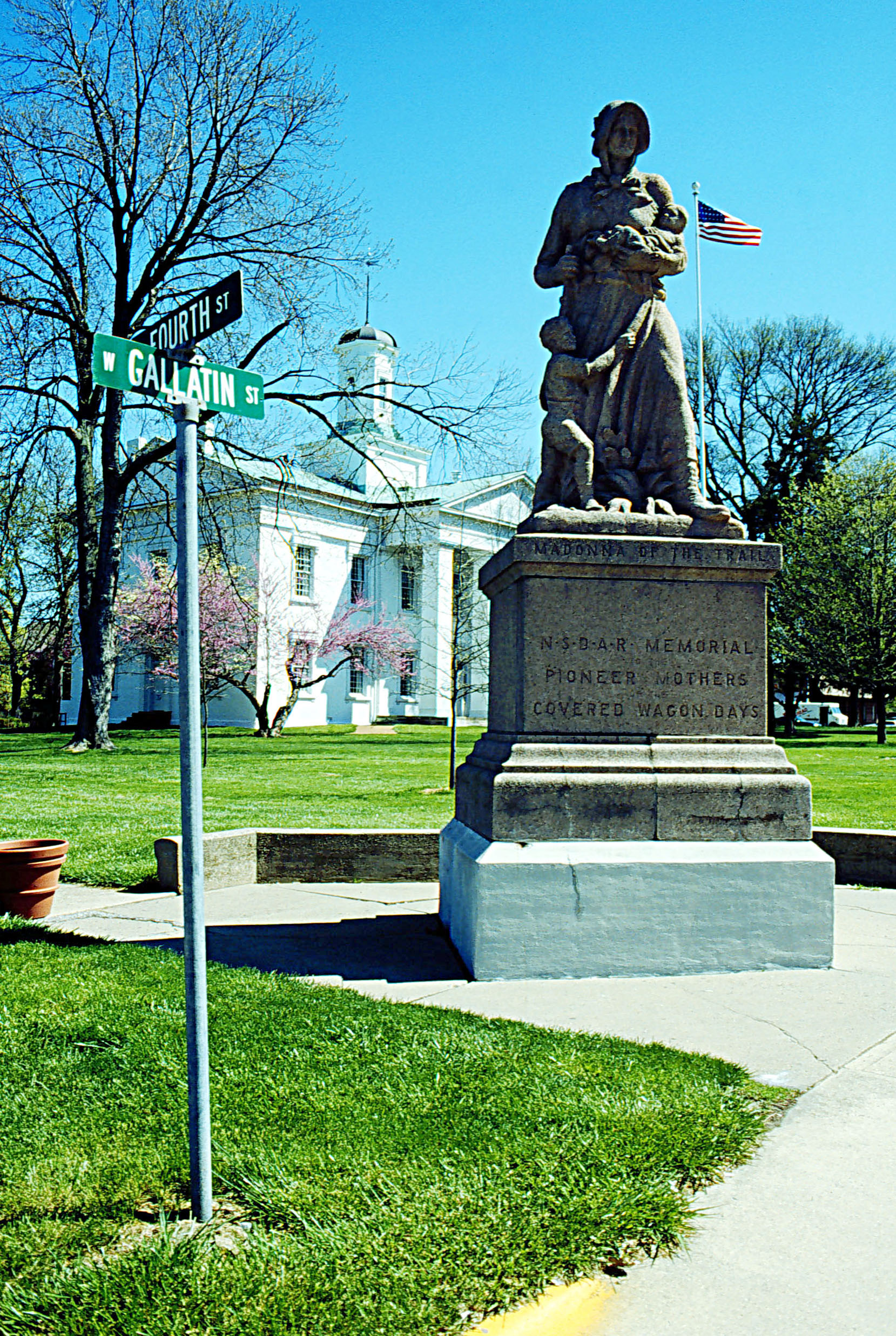
- Madonna of the Trail statue in front of the Vandalia State House.

- Location within Illinois Location within the United States
- Location: Vandalia, Fayette County, Illinois, USA
- Coordinates: 38°57′40″N 89°05′38″W
- Area: 1 acre (0.40 ha)
- Built: 1836
- NRHP reference No.: 74000760
- Added to NRHP: January 21, 1974

The Vandalia State House, built in 1836, is the fourth capitol building of the U.S. state of Illinois. It is also the oldest capitol building in Illinois to survive, as the first, second, and third capitol buildings have all disappeared. The brick Federal style state house has been operated by the state of Illinois as a monument of Illinois' pioneer years since 1933. It is located in Vandalia, Illinois, on the National Road (and National Old Trails Road), and listed on the National Register of Historic Places.

== Earlier capitols ==
Admitted to the Union in 1818, Illinois quickly abandoned its first governmental center of Kaskaskia in 1820 due to environmental threats. A second statehouse was built of lumber at the new capital of Vandalia, but it burned down after three years in 1823.

The third capitol building was hastily built in 1824 and was the beginning of Abraham Lincoln's political career as a member of the Illinois General Assembly in 1834. Elected from Sangamon County, closer to the geographic center of Illinois, Lincoln led a central Illinois caucus that called for the state government to move itself to the growing town of Springfield.

By the beginning of 1836, the building was structurally unsafe to the point that local assemblies refused to convene in it. In response, some townsmen wrote the then governor of Illinois Joseph Duncan about the situation, who informed them to see if the building could be repaired. After further examination of the cracked walls and sinking floor, a decision was made to tear down and rebuild a new statehouse. Construction took about four months from various regional companies and laborers. The new brick statehouse was unpainted, featuring a gable roof and a cupola, and cost $16,000. The new building was intentionally built with larger state office quarters, as it was deemed more important than the moving of the capitol.

== Later capitols ==
When Lincoln and his colleagues returned to Vandalia in the fall of 1836, they saw the new "State House" waiting for them. In February 1837, the legislature voted to move the governmental center to the more populous town of Springfield. The fifth Illinois capitol, the Old State Capitol State Historic Site located in Springfield, was used from 1839 to 1876. It has since been replaced by the sixth and current Illinois State Capitol.

== Vandalia State House ==
The State of Illinois gave the Vandalia State House to Fayette County for use as the county courthouse. Porticoes were added to the courthouse in the late 1850s, which made the building a structure in the Greek Revival style. The building served as a courthouse between 1839 and 1933, when it reverted to the state.

In 1933, the old courthouse became the Vandalia State House State Memorial, and an extensive interior refitting and reconstruction program began. In 1985, the building became a State Historic Site within the new Illinois Historic Preservation Agency, which maintains the old state house and interprets it to its brief time as Illinois's fourth capital building in 1836-39. Guided tours are offered, and visitors can also view the period rooms independently.

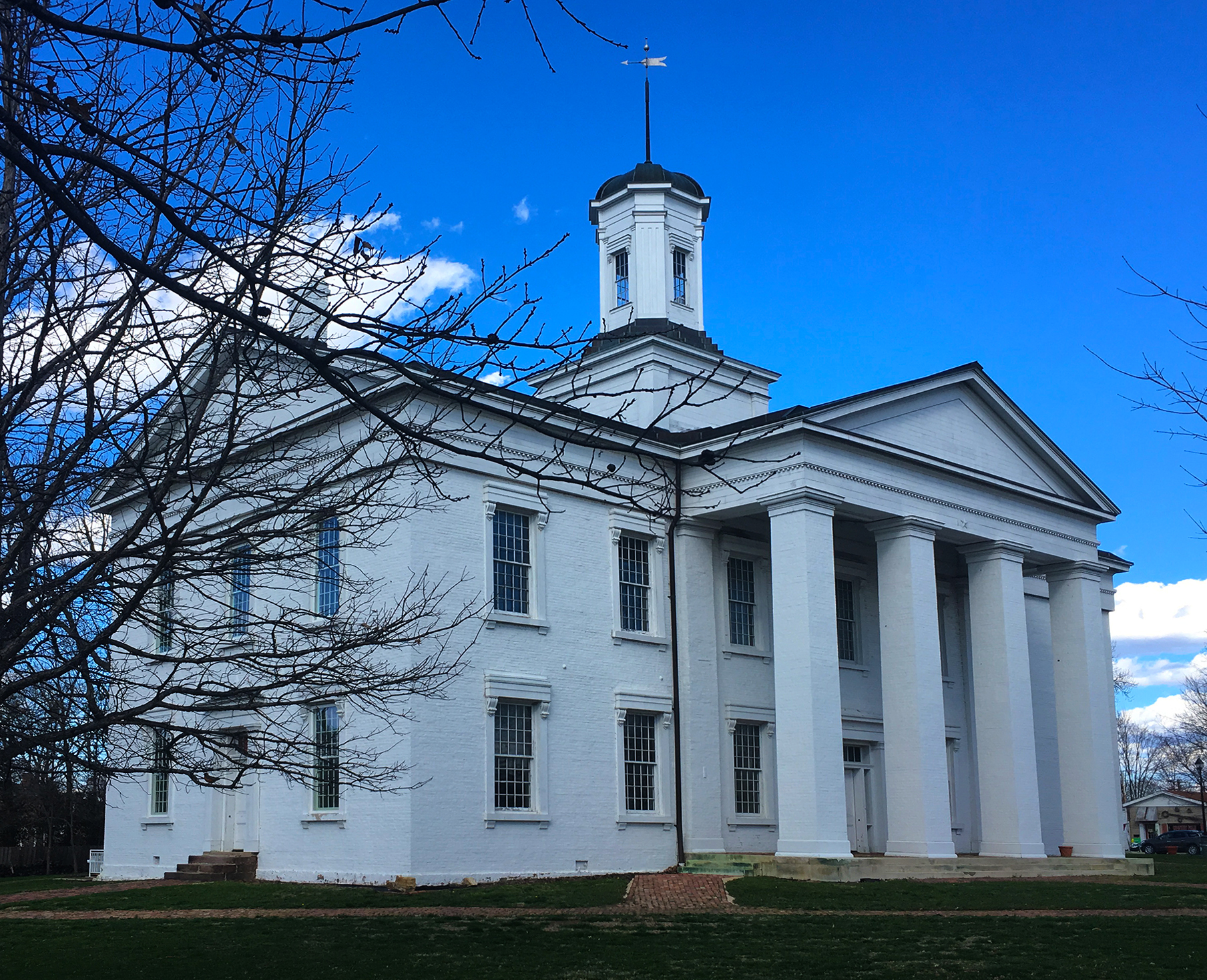
Exterior view in 2016

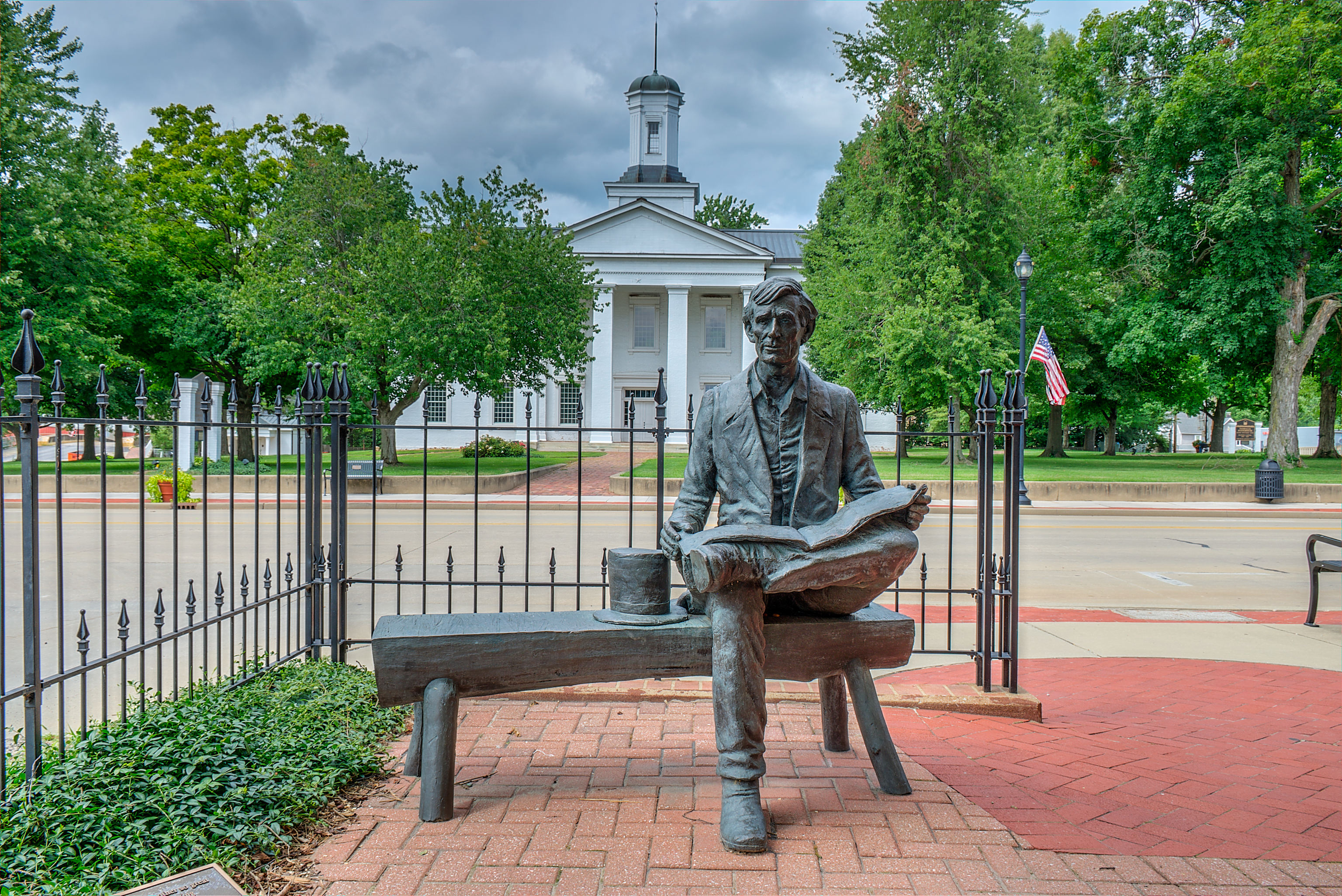
Bronze statue of Abraham Lincoln adjacent to the State House
