= Ramsey Lake State Recreation Area =

State park in Illinois, United States

- IUCN category V (protected landscape/seascape)
- Location within Illinois Location within the United States
- Location: Fayette County, Illinois, U.S.
- Nearest city: Ramsey, Illinois
- Coordinates: 39°09′52″N 89°08′08″W
- Area: 1,980 acres (800 ha)
- Governing body: Illinois Department of Natural Resources

Ramsey Lake State Recreation Area is a 1,980-acre (800 ha) state park located in Fayette County, Illinois, United States. The nearest town is Ramsey, Illinois, and the park is adjacent to U.S. Highway 51. The park is managed by the Illinois Department of Natural Resources (IDNR).

== Hunting, fishing, and boating ==
The Illinois Department of Natural Resources (IDNR) manages Ramsey Lake State Recreation Area (SRA) for a variety of active recreational uses, including boating, fishing, and hunting. The park centers on Ramsey Lake, a 3/4-mile (1.2 km) long, 40-acre (16 ha) artificial reservoir begun in 1947. The reservoir is named after Ramsey Creek, a tributary of the Kaskaskia River.

Before the creation of the state park, this parcel of property was called the Old Fox Chase Grounds; and Ramsey Lake occupies a valley named Fox Hunt Hollow in honor of the annual fox hunts that were hosted here by the Central Illinois Foxhunter's Association. Hunting today centers on whitetail deer, which are hunted by bow only, upland birds such as mourning doves, pheasants, quail, and wild turkey, and small game such as coyotes, raccoons, and squirrels.

Ramsey Lake is stocked with largemouth bass, bluegill, catfish, crappie, and sunfish. There is a power limit on the lake (electric motors only). The state park also contains six small fishing ponds and 24 small vernal ponds and patches of non-fishing wetland managed for frogs and other amphibia.

Other outdoor recreation opportunities are provided by a network of state park trails, headed by the 15-mile (24 km) Equestrian Trail and the 2.3-mile (3.7 km) Old Fox Chase Grounds Trail.

== Illinois Natural Area ==
A disjunct land parcel, the Ramsey Railroad Prairie, is managed by IDNR from the nearby state recreation area. Currently, the 11.26 acres (4.56 ha) railroad prairie is a strip of land of 6,500 feet (2,000 m) in length and 75 feet (23 m) in width, running north-and-south adjacent to Township Road 750E. It is classified by IDNR as dry-mesic and mesic prairie.

Historically, the prairie grows on a strip of land originally granted to the Illinois Central Railroad in 1850 to construct what was planned to be the railroad's central Illinois main line from Centralia, Illinois to Peru, Illinois. The economic boom of the 1850s in Chicago caused the Illinois Central's Chicago spur line to supplant the railroad's original main line. The Centralia-Peru line was eventually de-emphasized and abandoned. The railroad prairie was dedicated as an Illinois Natural Area in October 1997.
