= Fayette County, Illinois =

County in Illinois, United States

- County
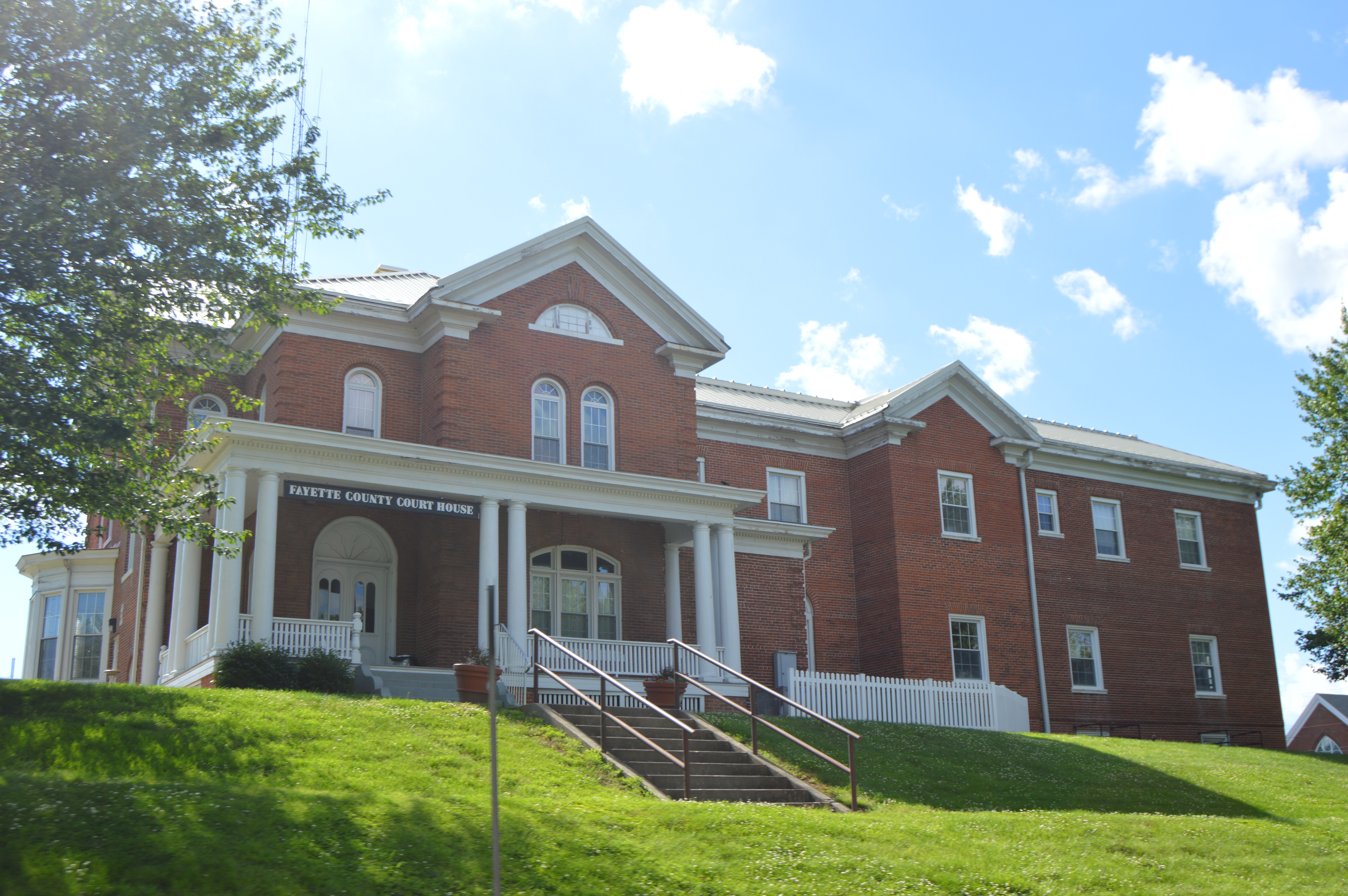
- Fayette County Courthouse in Vandalia

- Location within the U.S. state of Illinois
- Coordinates: 39°00′N 89°01′W
- Country: United States
- State: Illinois
- Founded: 1821
- Named for: Marquis de Lafayette
- Seat: Vandalia
- Largest city: Vandalia

Area
  - Total: 725 sq mi (1,880 km^{2})
  - Land: 716 sq mi (1,850 km^{2})
  - Water: 8.9 sq mi (23 km^{2}) 1.2%

Population (2020)
  - Total: 21,488
  - Estimate (2025): 20,790 ▼
  - Density: 30.0/sq mi (11.6/km^{2})
- Time zone: UTC−6 (Central)
  - Summer (DST): UTC−5 (CDT)
- Congressional district: 15th
- Website: www.fayettecountyillinois.gov

Fayette County is a county located in the U.S. state of Illinois. As of the 2020 census, the population was 21,488. Its county seat is Vandalia, the site of the Vandalia State House State Historic Site. Ramsey Lake State Recreation Area is located in the northwestern part of this county.

== History ==
Fayette County was formed in 1821 out of Bond, Clark, and Crawford counties; according to one source, the county was formed on February 14, 1812. It was named in honor of the Marquis de LaFayette, French hero of the American Revolutionary War.

In 1823, Marion County, Illinois was carved out from the southernmost part of Fayette County; this was followed by the creation of Clay, Clinton and Shelby Counties from Fayette County areas. Early Tazewell County also received acreage from Fayette County. The year 1831 saw the creation of Effingham County and the establishment of the modern Fayette County boundaries.

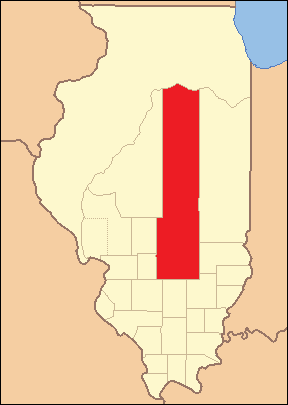
Fayette County between the time of its creation and 1823

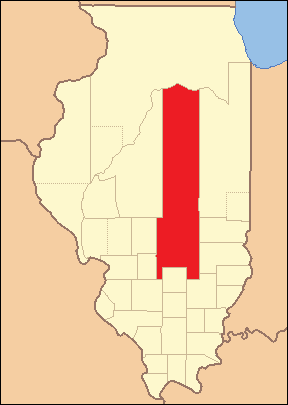
Fayette between 1823 and 1824

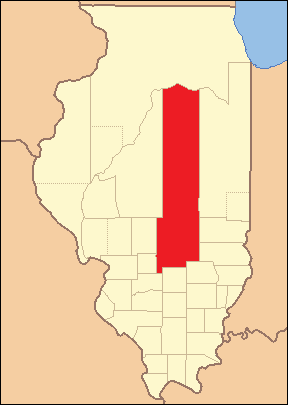
Fayette between 1824 and 1827

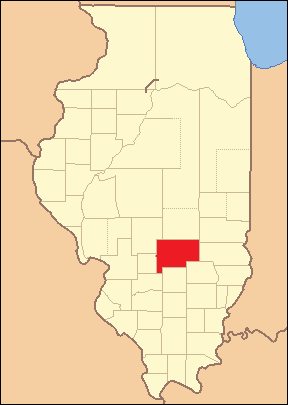
Fayette between 1827 and 1831

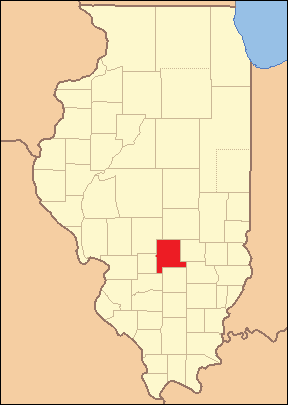
Fayette in 1831, when the creation of Effingham County reduced it to its current size

== Geography ==
According to the U.S. Census Bureau, the county has a total area of 725 square miles (1,880 km^{2}), of which 716 square miles (1,850 km^{2}) is land and 8.9 square miles (23 km^{2}) (1.2%) is water.

=== Climate and weather ===
Vandalia, Illinois

Climate chart (precipitation, max. and min. temperature)
J	F	M	A	M	J	J	A	S	O	N	D
2.5 35 18	2.4 41 23	3.7 52 32	3.6 64 43	4.1 74 53	3.9 83 62	3.6 88 67	2.8 86 64	3 79 55	2.8 67 43	3.7 53 34	2.8 40 24
- █ Average max. and min. temperatures in °F
- █ Precipitation totals in inches
- Source: The Weather Channel
Metric conversion
J	F	M	A	M	J	J	A	S	O	N	D
63 2 −8	61 5 −5	94 11 0	91 18 6	104 23 12	100 28 17	92 31 19	71 30 18	75 26 13	72 19 6	94 12 1	70 4 −4
- █ Average max. and min. temperatures in °C
- █ Precipitation totals in mm

In recent years, average temperatures in the county seat of Vandalia have ranged from a low of 18 °F (−8 °C) in January to a high of 88 °F (31 °C) in July, although a record low of −21 °F (−29 °C) was recorded in January 1985 and a record high of 104 °F (40 °C) was recorded in July 1980. Average monthly precipitation ranged from 2.41 inches (61 mm) in February to 4.11 inches (104 mm) in May.

=== Adjacent counties ===
- Shelby County - northeast
- Effingham County - east
- Clay County - southeast
- Marion County - south
- Clinton County - southwest
- Bond County - west
- Montgomery County - northwest

=== Major highways ===
- Interstate 57
- Interstate 70
- U.S. Route 40
- U.S. Route 51
- Illinois Route 33
- Illinois Route 37
- Illinois Route 128
- Illinois Route 140
- Illinois Route 185

== Demographics ==
Historical population
Census	Pop.	Note	%±
1830	2,704		—
1840	6,328		134.0%
1850	8,075		27.6%
1860	11,189		38.6%
1870	19,638		75.5%
1880	23,241		18.3%
1890	23,367		0.5%
1900	28,065		20.1%
1910	28,075		0.0%
1920	26,187		−6.7%
1930	23,487		−10.3%
1940	29,159		24.1%
1950	24,582		−15.7%
1960	21,946		−10.7%
1970	20,752		−5.4%
1980	22,167		6.8%
1990	20,893		−5.7%
2000	21,802		4.4%
2010	22,140		1.6%
2020	21,488		−2.9%
2025 (est.)	20,790	▼	−3.2%
U.S. Decennial Census; 1790-1960 1900-1990; 1990-2000 2010

2000 census age pyramid for Fayette County, skewed toward the male side by the Vandalia Correctional Center, an Illinois State prison, located in the county.

=== 2020 census ===
As of the 2020 census, the county had a population of 21,488. The median age was 41.4 years. 20.7% of residents were under the age of 18 and 18.5% of residents were 65 years of age or older. For every 100 females there were 122.2 males, and for every 100 females age 18 and over there were 126.3 males age 18 and over.

The racial makeup of the county was 92.0% White, 3.7% Black or African American, 0.4% American Indian and Alaska Native, 0.3% Asian, <0.1% Native Hawaiian and Pacific Islander, 0.9% from some other race, and 2.7% from two or more races. Hispanic or Latino residents of any race comprised 3.1% of the population.

37.7% of residents lived in urban areas, while 62.3% lived in rural areas.

There were 7,935 households in the county, of which 28.6% had children under the age of 18 living in them. Of all households, 51.3% were married-couple households, 18.2% were households with a male householder and no spouse or partner present, and 23.7% were households with a female householder and no spouse or partner present. About 28.7% of all households were made up of individuals and 14.9% had someone living alone who was 65 years of age or older.

There were 8,829 housing units, of which 10.1% were vacant. Among occupied housing units, 78.4% were owner-occupied and 21.6% were renter-occupied. The homeowner vacancy rate was 1.6% and the rental vacancy rate was 9.5%.

=== Racial and ethnic composition ===
Fayette County County, Illinois – Racial and ethnic composition Note: the US Census treats Hispanic/Latino as an ethnic category. This table excludes Latinos from the racial categories and assigns them to a separate category. Hispanics/Latinos may be of any race.
Race / Ethnicity (NH = Non-Hispanic)	Pop 1980	Pop 1990	Pop 2000	Pop 2010	Pop 2020	% 1980	% 1990	% 2000	% 2010	% 2020
White alone (NH)	21,665	20,089	20,386	20,585	19,425	97.74%	96.15%	93.51%	92.98%	90.40%
Black or African American alone (NH)	297	581	1,064	969	780	1.34%	2.78%	4.88%	4.38%	3.63%
Native American or Alaska Native alone (NH)	37	37	25	33	80	0.17%	0.18%	0.11%	0.15%	0.37%
Asian alone (NH)	26	31	37	47	67	0.12%	0.15%	0.17%	0.21%	0.31%
Native Hawaiian or Pacific Islander alone (NH)	x	x	4	4	1	x	x	0.02%	0.02%	0.00%
Other race alone (NH)	9	1	9	6	31	0.04%	0.00%	0.04%	0.03%	0.14%
Mixed race or Multiracial (NH)	x	x	103	192	447	x	x	0.47%	0.87%	2.08%
Hispanic or Latino (any race)	133	154	174	304	657	0.60%	0.74%	0.80%	1.37%	3.06%
Total	22,167	20,893	21,802	22,140	21,488	100.00%	100.00%	100.00%	100.00%	100.00%

=== 2010 census ===
As of the 2010 United States census, there were 22,140 people, 8,311 households, and 5,648 families living in the county. The population density was 30.9 inhabitants per square mile (11.9/km^{2}). There were 9,302 housing units at an average density of 13.0 per square mile (5.0/km^{2}). The racial makeup of the county was 93.7% white, 4.4% black or African American, 0.2% Asian, 0.2% American Indian, 0.4% from other races, and 1.0% from two or more races. Those of Hispanic or Latino origin made up 1.4% of the population. In terms of ancestry, 27.5% were German, 10.5% were English, 9.4% were American, and 9.3% were Irish.

Of the 8,311 households, 31.2% had children under the age of 18 living with them, 53.3% were married couples living together, 9.7% had a female householder with no husband present, 32.0% were non-families, and 27.2% of all households were made up of individuals. The average household size was 2.45 and the average family size was 2.95. The median age was 39.9 years.

The median income for a household in the county was $41,269 and the median income for a family was $51,216. Males had a median income of $38,257 versus $27,188 for females. The per capita income for the county was $21,663. About 10.8% of families and 16.1% of the population were below the poverty line, including 22.6% of those under age 18 and 12.0% of those age 65 or over.

== Communities ==
=== Cities ===
- St. Elmo
- Vandalia (seat)

=== Villages ===
- Bingham
- Brownstown
- Farina
- Ramsey
- St. Peter

=== Census-designated place ===
- La Clede

=== Unincorporated communities ===
- Augsburg
- Avena
- Bayle City
- Bluff City
- Confidence
- Dressor
- Hagarstown
- Loogootee
- Pittsburg
- Saint James
- Saint Paul
- Shafter
- Shobonier
- Vera

=== Townships ===
Fayette County is divided into twenty townships:

- Avena
- Bear Grove
- Bowling Green
- Carson
- Hurricane
- Kaskaskia
- LaClede
- Lone Grove
- Loudon
- Otego
- Pope
- Ramsey
- Sefton
- Seminary
- Shafter
- Sharon
- South Hurricane
- Vandalia
- Wheatland
- Wilberton

== Politics ==
Until the beginning of the twentieth century, Fayette County was rock-ribbed Democratic. It was not won by a Republican until Theodore Roosevelt’s landslide win of 1904. The county voted after that for the winning candidate in every election until 1940, when opposition to Franklin D. Roosevelt’s economic and war policies gave the county to Wendell Willkie. Since then only two Democratic presidential candidates have gained an absolute majority in the county – the more recent of these two, Jimmy Carter in 1976, doing so by a single vote.

Donald Trump has won by more than 75% in each of his three campaigns.

United States presidential election results for Fayette County, Illinois
Year	Republican		Democratic		Third party(ies)	
Year	No.	%	No.	%	No.	%
1892	1,980	36.66%	2,433	45.05%	988	18.29%
1896	2,769	42.46%	3,627	55.61%	126	1.93%
1900	2,920	44.79%	3,423	52.51%	176	2.70%
1904	3,253	51.62%	2,650	42.05%	399	6.33%
1908	3,261	48.67%	3,193	47.66%	246	3.67%
1912	1,481	24.51%	2,782	46.04%	1,779	29.44%
1916	5,316	46.55%	5,669	49.65%	434	3.80%
1920	5,758	58.48%	3,824	38.84%	264	2.68%
1924	5,010	48.43%	4,668	45.13%	666	6.44%
1928	6,545	61.65%	3,998	37.66%	73	0.69%
1932	5,122	41.44%	7,053	57.06%	185	1.50%
1936	6,419	48.01%	6,824	51.04%	128	0.96%
1940	7,486	50.19%	7,286	48.85%	143	0.96%
1944	6,332	53.27%	5,435	45.72%	120	1.01%
1948	5,717	49.25%	5,771	49.72%	120	1.03%
1952	7,028	56.96%	5,299	42.95%	12	0.10%
1956	6,739	57.81%	4,914	42.15%	5	0.04%
1960	6,586	57.25%	4,907	42.65%	11	0.10%
1964	4,492	41.64%	6,295	58.36%	0	0.00%
1968	5,449	52.38%	4,011	38.56%	943	9.06%
1972	6,574	61.05%	4,192	38.93%	2	0.02%
1976	5,059	49.33%	5,128	50.00%	68	0.66%
1980	6,523	62.67%	3,614	34.72%	271	2.60%
1984	6,607	63.09%	3,844	36.70%	22	0.21%
1988	5,452	53.88%	4,632	45.78%	34	0.34%
1992	3,508	34.67%	4,833	47.77%	1,777	17.56%
1996	3,881	44.14%	3,887	44.21%	1,024	11.65%
2000	5,200	55.69%	3,886	41.61%	252	2.70%
2004	5,880	61.58%	3,571	37.40%	98	1.03%
2008	5,499	56.64%	3,967	40.86%	242	2.49%
2012	5,951	66.03%	2,853	31.66%	208	2.31%
2016	7,372	76.86%	1,819	18.97%	400	4.17%
2020	8,055	79.94%	1,826	18.12%	195	1.94%
2024	7,847	81.52%	1,632	16.95%	147	1.53%

== See also ==
- National Register of Historic Places listings in Fayette County, Illinois
