= Vandalia, Illinois =

- City
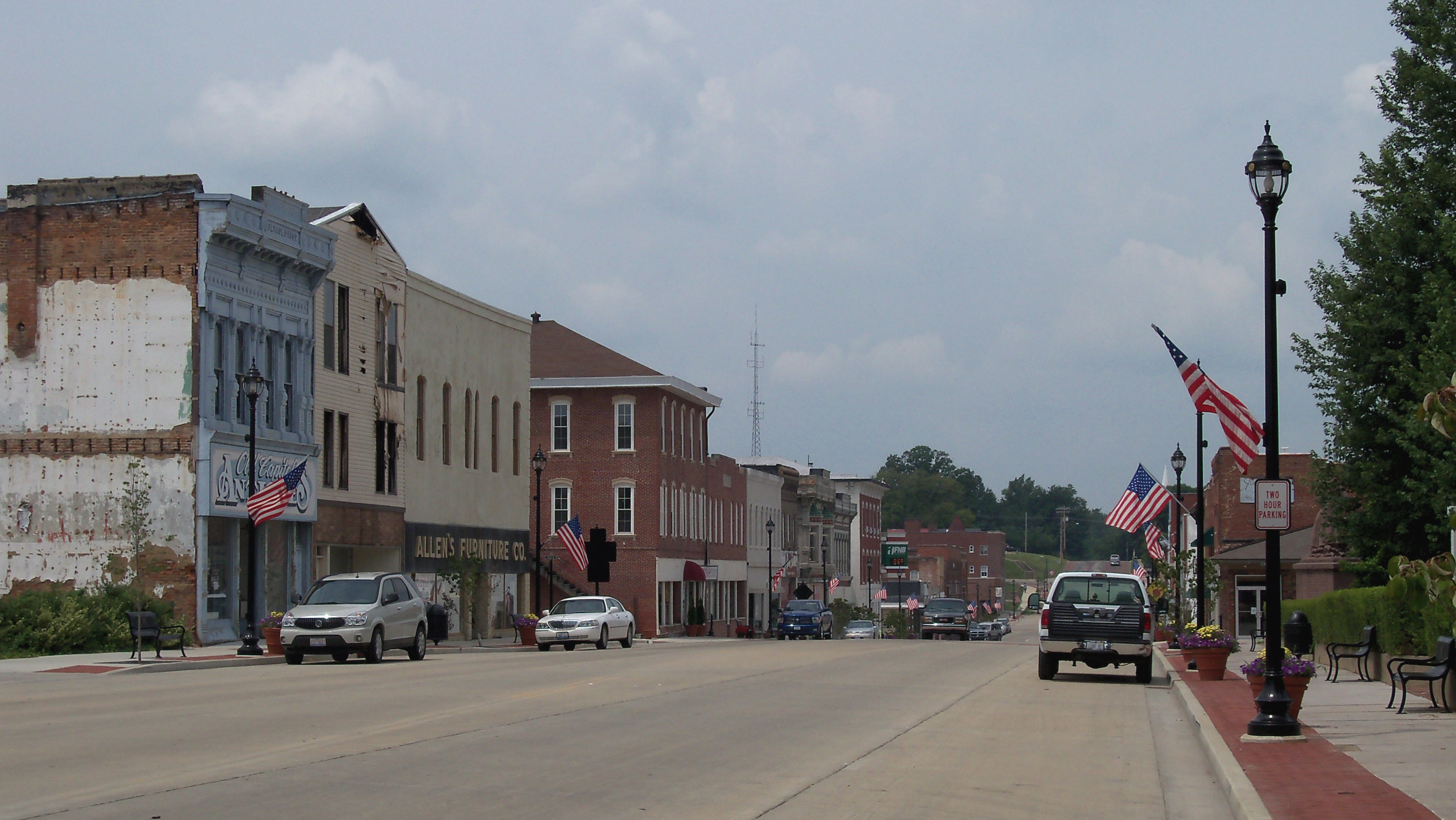
- Downtown Vandalia
- Motto: "Oldest Existing Illinois Capital City"
- Interactive map of Vandalia, Illinois
- Location within Illinois Location within the United States
- Coordinates: 38°58′40″N 89°06′52″W
- Country: United States
- State: Illinois
- County: Fayette
- Townships: Vandalia, Bear Grove, Sharon
- Founded: 1819

Area
  - Total: 8.16 sq mi (21.14 km^{2})
  - Land: 8.15 sq mi (21.10 km^{2})
  - Water: 0.015 sq mi (0.04 km^{2})
- Elevation: 518 ft (158 m)

Population (2020)
  - Total: 7,458
  - Density: 915.5/sq mi (353.46/km^{2})
- Time zone: UTC−6 (CST)
  - Summer (DST): UTC−5 (CDT)
- ZIP Code: 62471
- Area code: 618
- FIPS code: 17-77317
- GNIS feature ID: 2397119
- Website: vandaliaillinois.com

Vandalia is a city in and the county seat of Fayette County, Illinois, United States. At the 2020 Census, the population was 7,458. The city is 60 miles (97 km) northeast of the Greater St. Louis area on the Kaskaskia River. In the early 19th century, Vandalia became the western terminus of the National Road (the first federal road) from the East Coast. Vandalia served as the state capital of Illinois from 1819 until 1839, when the seat of state government moved closer to the center of the state in Springfield. Since 1933, the Vandalia State House State Historic Site preserves and interprets the State House capital building and grounds, originally constructed in 1836.

== History ==
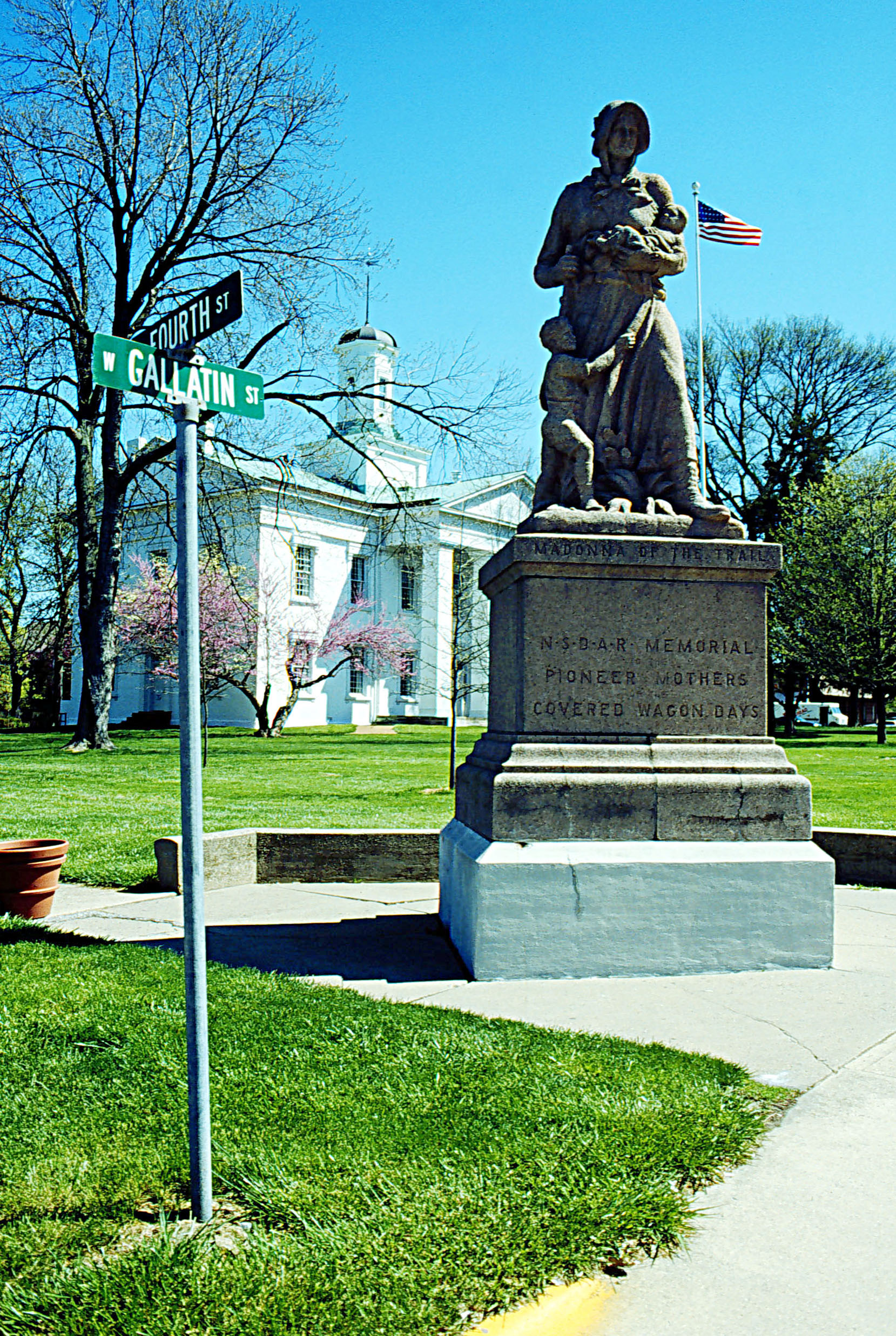
Madonna of the Trail statue in front of the Vandalia State House

Vandalia was founded in 1819 as a new capital city for Illinois. The previous capital, Kaskaskia, was unsuitable because it was on the south-east border of the new state and under the constant threat of flooding. The more centrally located townsite, located in Bond County at the time, was hastily prepared for the 1820 meeting of the Illinois General Assembly. In 1821, Fayette County was created, including Vandalia.

The history of the name Vandalia is uncertain. Different theories can be found in almost all of the books written about Vandalia over the years. In her book Vandalia: Wilderness Capital of Lincoln's Land, Mary Burtschi tells of a conversation between one of the original surveyors of the town and a Vandalia resident. The surveyor, Colonel Greenup, explained that Van was suggested by one of the men. He recommended this as an abbreviation to the word vanguard meaning the forefront of an advancing movement. Another suggestion was made for the term dalia, derived from the Anglo-Saxon word dale which means a valley between hills. Greenup takes credit in the conversation for connecting the two terms to form the name Vandalia.

Another possible source of the name is the Vandalia colony, a failed attempt to establish a fourteenth colony in part of what is now West Virginia and Kentucky. The Vandalia colony was named in honor of Queen Charlotte, who claimed descent from the Wendish tribe of Obodrites, also called the Vandals.

Another theory put forth is that Vandalia was named by those who located the state capital in the town; according to the story, they mistakenly thought the Vandals were a brave Native American tribe, rather than of Germanic origins.

The law under which Vandalia was founded included a provision that the capital would not be moved for twenty years. Even before the end of this period, the population center of the state had shifted far north of Vandalia. In 1837, the General Assembly voted to move the capital to Springfield.

On November 21, 1915, the Liberty Bell passed through Vandalia on its nationwide tour, while being returned to Philadelphia, Pennsylvania from the Panama-Pacific International Exposition in San Francisco.

In the early 1960s the sociologist Joseph Lyford examined the social structure of Vandalia in a book-length study that revealed the essentially corporatist nature of decision-making in the city; this work was recently revisited by the Economist newspaper.

== Geography ==
According to the 2010 census, Vandalia has a total area of 8.116 square miles (21.02 km^{2}), of which 8.1 square miles (20.98 km^{2}) (or 99.8%) is land and 0.016 square miles (0.04 km^{2}) (or 0.2%) is water.

Vandalia is situated on Interstate 70, U.S. Route 40 (the National Road) and U.S. Route 51.

=== Climate ===
Climate data for Vandalia, Illinois (1991–2020 normals, extremes 1899–present)
Month	Jan	Feb	Mar	Apr	May	Jun	Jul	Aug	Sep	Oct	Nov	Dec	Year
Record high °F (°C)	72 (22)	77 (25)	84 (29)	89 (32)	94 (34)	104 (40)	111 (44)	106 (41)	98 (37)	97 (36)	81 (27)	72 (22)	111 (44)
Mean daily maximum °F (°C)	36.9 (2.7)	41.9 (5.5)	52.7 (11.5)	65.1 (18.4)	74.9 (23.8)	83.7 (28.7)	86.8 (30.4)	85.9 (29.9)	79.6 (26.4)	67.7 (19.8)	53.7 (12.1)	41.5 (5.3)	64.2 (17.9)
Daily mean °F (°C)	28.8 (−1.8)	33.0 (0.6)	42.9 (6.1)	54.2 (12.3)	64.6 (18.1)	73.5 (23.1)	76.7 (24.8)	75.2 (24.0)	67.7 (19.8)	55.8 (13.2)	43.9 (6.6)	33.6 (0.9)	54.2 (12.3)
Mean daily minimum °F (°C)	20.7 (−6.3)	24.2 (−4.3)	33.2 (0.7)	43.3 (6.3)	54.2 (12.3)	63.2 (17.3)	66.6 (19.2)	64.4 (18.0)	55.8 (13.2)	44.0 (6.7)	34.1 (1.2)	25.6 (−3.6)	44.1 (6.7)
Record low °F (°C)	−22 (−30)	−19 (−28)	−9 (−23)	20 (−7)	28 (−2)	39 (4)	48 (9)	41 (5)	20 (−7)	22 (−6)	5 (−15)	−17 (−27)	−22 (−30)
Average precipitation inches (mm)	2.97 (75)	2.49 (63)	3.32 (84)	4.86 (123)	5.30 (135)	4.87 (124)	3.90 (99)	3.24 (82)	3.07 (78)	3.26 (83)	3.76 (96)	2.69 (68)	43.73 (1,111)
Average precipitation days (≥ 0.01 in)	8.9	7.2	9.5	11.0	12.4	9.9	8.0	7.4	6.8	8.2	9.2	8.3	106.8
Source: NOAA

== Demographics ==
Historical population
Census	Pop.	Note	%±
1850	419		—
1860	1,145		173.3%
1870	1,771		54.7%
1880	2,056		16.1%
1890	2,144		4.3%
1900	2,665		24.3%
1910	2,974		11.6%
1920	3,316		11.5%
1930	4,342		30.9%
1940	5,288		21.8%
1950	5,471		3.5%
1960	5,537		1.2%
1970	5,160		−6.8%
1980	5,338		3.4%
1990	6,114		14.5%
2000	6,975		14.1%
2010	7,042		1.0%
2020	7,458		5.9%
U.S. Decennial Census

=== 2020 census ===
As of the 2020 census, Vandalia had a population of 7,458 and 1,247 families.

The population density was 913.63 inhabitants per square mile (352.75/km^{2}).

The median age was 38.9 years. 15.5% of residents were under the age of 18 and 14.9% of residents were 65 years of age or older. For every 100 females there were 171.4 males, and for every 100 females age 18 and over there were 187.3 males age 18 and over.

98.1% of residents lived in urban areas, while 1.9% lived in rural areas.

There were 2,311 households in Vandalia, of which 26.7% had children under the age of 18 living in them. Of all households, 36.0% were married-couple households, 21.2% were households with a male householder and no spouse or partner present, and 35.0% were households with a female householder and no spouse or partner present. About 38.3% of all households were made up of individuals and 19.1% had someone living alone who was 65 years of age or older. The average household size was 2.97 and the average family size was 2.25.

There were 2,629 housing units, with an average density of 322.06 per square mile (124.35/km^{2}). Of all housing units, 12.1% were vacant. The homeowner vacancy rate was 2.8% and the rental vacancy rate was 10.5%.

Racial composition as of the 2020 census
Race	Number	Percent
White	6,242	83.7%
Black or African American	764	10.2%
American Indian and Alaska Native	64	0.9%
Asian	36	0.5%
Native Hawaiian and Other Pacific Islander	0	0.0%
Some other race	148	2.0%
Two or more races	204	2.7%
Hispanic or Latino (of any race)	515	6.9%

=== Income and poverty ===
The median income for a household in the city was $35,862, and the median income for a family was $48,454. Males had a median income of $28,600 versus $23,833 for females. The per capita income for the city was $17,994. About 16.8% of families and 20.1% of the population were below the poverty line, including 22.9% of those under age 18 and 11.2% of those age 65 or over.

== Government ==
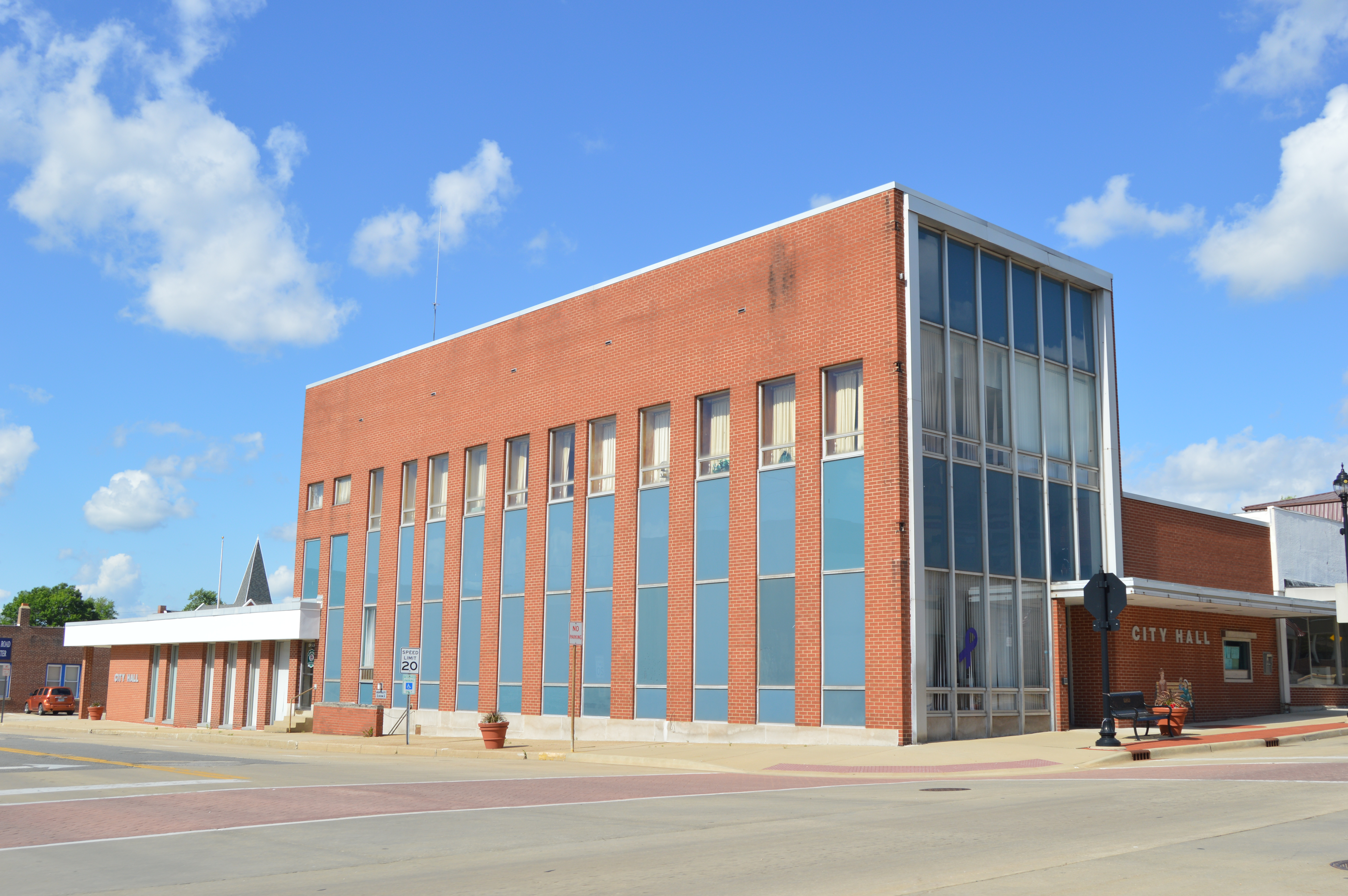
Vandalia City Hall

Vandalia is governed using the mayor council system. The council consists of eight members elected from one of four wards with each ward electing two members. The mayor along with the city clerk and treasurer are elected in a citywide vote.

== Education ==
The city has a Board of Education. Among the public schools in the city are Jefferson Elementary School and former Central School, which was condemned in 1980. The city's first high school was established in 1858. Vandalia is home to the Okaw Valley Area Vocational Center, which trains high school students in vocational trades. It also serves vocational students from nearby high schools such as those in Greenville and Mulberry Grove. The building trades class at the center each year purchases property in Vandalia, builds a house, and sells the improved property. They have sold 33 homes constructed by students.

== Notable people ==
- Alfred Elisha Ames, Illinois and Minnesota politician, physician
- Josie Barnes, professional bowler: winner of the 2021 U.S. Women's Open and 2025 USBC Queens
- Henry P. H. Bromwell, Illinois politician, U.S. Representative from Illinois
- John J. Bullington, Illinois politician
- Levi Davis, Illinois Auditor and lawyer
- H. Joel Deckard, U.S. Representative from Indiana
- William Lee D. Ewing, U.S. Senator and fifth Governor of Illinois
- William M. Farmer, Chief Justice of the Illinois Supreme Court
- Ferris Foreman, Illinois and California politician, Army colonel
- John W. Heavey, U.S. Army brigadier general, chief of the National Guard Bureau
- Miles E. Mills, Illinois politician and educator
- Frederick Remann, Illinois politician, U.S. Representative from Illinois
- June Squibb, Academy Award-nominated actress

== In fiction and popular culture ==
- The case of Frier v. City of Vandalia was a case decided by the Seventh Circuit Court of Appeals on the issue of res judicata. The case originally involved a parking dispute in Vandalia but became a pivotal case in civil procedure.
- Four US Navy ships have been named for Vandalia.
