= List of lakes of Illinois =

This is a list of lakes and reservoirs in the U.S. state of Illinois. The lakes are ordered by their unique names, (i.e. Lake Smith or Smith Lake would both be listed under "S"). Swimming, fishing, and/or boating are permitted in some of these lakes, but not all.

== A ==
- Anderson Lake, Fulton County
- Antioch Lake, Antioch, Lake County. 42°28′07″N 88°05′54″W
- Apple Canyon Lake (reservoir), a private lake resort community near Apple River in Jo Daviess County. 42°25′57″N 90°09′58″W
- Argyle Lake (reservoir), McDonough County
- Lake Arlington, Arlington Heights, Cook County. 42°06′55″N 87°57′40″W
- Augusta Lake (reservoir), Hancock County. 40°15′45″N 90°55′15″W

== B ==
- Baldwin Lake (reservoir), Randolph County
- Bangs Lake, Wauconda, Lake County
- Lake Barrington, Lake County
- Bayles Lake (reservoir), Iroquois County
- Big Bear Lake, Vernon Hills, Lake County. 42°14′54″N 87°57′45″W
- Lake Bloomington (reservoir), McLean County. 40°39′41″N 88°56′10″W
- Bluff Lake, Lake County. 42°27′11″N 88°07′43″W
- Lake Bracken (reservoir), Galesburg, Knox County. 40°51′27″N 90°20′55″W
- Butler Lake (reservoir), Libertyville, Lake County. 42°17′31″N 87°57′57″W

== C ==
- Lake Calumet, Chicago, Cook County
- Candlewick Lake (reservoir), Boone County. 42°20′52″N 88°52′18″W
- Canton Lake (reservoir), Fulton County
- Lake Carlton (reservoir), Whiteside County
- Carlyle Lake (reservoir), Clinton County
- Lake Carroll (reservoir), Carroll County
- Lake Catherine, Lake County. 42°29′08″N 88°07′03″W
- Cedar Lake (reservoir), Jackson County
- Cedar Lake, Lake Villa, Lake County. 42°25′20″N 88°05′23″W
- Lake Centralia (reservoir), Marion County. 38°32′48″N 88°59′43″W
- Chain O'Lakes, Lake and McHenry Counties
- Channel Lake, Lake County
- Lake Charles (reservoir), Lake County
- Lake Charleston (reservoir), Coles County
- Clear Lake, Sangamon County
- Clinton Lake (reservoir), DeWitt County
- Coffeen Lake (reservoir), Montgomery County
- Countryside Lake (reservoir), Lake County. 42°15′09″N 88°02′36″W
- Crab Orchard Lake (reservoir), Williamson County
- Cranberry Lake, Lake County. 42°21′12″N 88°04′10″W
- Crystal Lake, McHenry County
- Lake Charleston, coles county

== D ==
- Davis Lake, Lake County. 42°15′42″N 88°05′15″W
- Dawson Lake (reservoir), McLean County
- Lake Decatur (reservoir), Macon County
- Deep Lake, Lake County. 42°25′21″N 88°04′01″W
- Deer Lake, Lake County. 42°29′00″N 88°02′05″W
- Devils Kitchen Lake (reservoir), Williamson County
- Diamond Lake, near Mundelein, Lake County. 42°15′01″N 88°00′27″W
- Druce Lake, Lake County. 42°22′05″N 88°00′17″W
- Duck Lake, Lake County. 42°22′43″N 88°09′21″W
- Dunlap Lake (reservoir), Madison County. 38°48′10″N 89°55′55″W

== E ==
- East Fork Lake (reservoir), Richland County.38°45′30″N 88°03′54″W
- Echo Lake, Lake Zurich, Lake County. 42°12′34″N 88°05′25″W
- Lake of Egypt (reservoir), Williamson and Johnson Counties
- Elmwood Farms Lake (reservoir), Lake County. 42°26′59″N 88°00′08″W
- Evergreen Lake (reservoir), McLean and Woodford Counties. 40°38′17″N 89°02′11″W

== F ==
- Lake Fairfield, Lake County. 42°17′13″N 88°06′40″W
- Ferne Clyffe Lake, Johnson County
- Fish Lake, Lake County, previously known as Duncan Lake. 42°20′08″N 88°09′21″W
- Five Oaks Ski Lake, Frankfort, Will County
- Forest Lake, Lake County
- Fourth Lake, Lake Villa, Lake County. 42°23′30″N 88°01′58″W
- Fox Lake, Lake County
- Frentress Lake, Jo Daviess County
- Fyre Lake (reservoir), near Sherrard, Mercer County. 41°17′49″N 90°29′22″W

== G ==
- Gages Lake, Lake County
- Lake Galena (reservoir), Jo Daviess County
- Lake Glenn Shoals (reservoir), Montgomery County
- Goose Lake, Grundy County
- Governor Bond Lake (reservoir), Bond County
- Grass Lake, Lake County. 42°26′33″N 88°09′42″W
- Grassy Lake, Lake County. 42°12′23″N 88°08′54″W
- Grays Lake, Lake County
- Griswold Lake, McHenry County. 42°17′19″N 88°13′05″W

== H ==
- Hastings Lake, Lake County. 42°25′35″N 88°02′19″W
- Heidecke Lake, Grundy County
- Hendrick Lake, Lake County. 42°26′19″N 88°02′50″W
- Hifer Lake, McLean County. 40°39′42″N 88°36′36″W
- Highland Lake, Lake County. 42°21′40″N 88°03′43″W
- Lake Hillcrest (reservoir), Madison County
- Lake Holiday (reservoir), LaSalle County
- Homer White Lake (reservoir), Lake County. 42°27′03″N 88°02′22″W
- Honey Lake, Lake County. 42°12′02″N 88°07′48″W
- Horseshoe Lake, Alexander County
- Horseshoe Lake, Madison County

== I ==
- Lake Iroquois (reservoir), Iroquois County
- Island Lake, Lake and McHenry Counties

== J ==
- Lake Jacksonville (reservoir), near Jacksonville, Morgan County

== K ==
- Kellart Lake (reservoir), near Cissna Park, Iroquois County. 40°36′08″N 87°53′17″W
- Kidd Lake, Monroe County
- Lake Killarney, McHenry County
- Kinkaid Lake (reservoir), Jackson County

== L ==
- Lake in the Hills
- Lake Lancelot, Peoria County
- LaSalle Lake State Fish and Wildlife Area
- Lake Le-Aqua-Na State Park
- Lincoln Lake near Coal City
- Lake Linden in Lindenhurst
- Lake Petersburg, Menard County
- Little Grassy Lake (reservoir), Jackson and Williamson Counties
- Little Swan Lake (reservoir), near Avon, Fulton County
- Long Lake
- Loon Lake (East and West), Lake County
- Lake Lou Yaeger, Montgomery County
- Lake Louise in Barrington
- Lake Louise near Bryon

== M ==
- Lake Marie, Lake County
- Lake Mattoon (reservoir), Coles, Cumberland and Shelby Counties
- McCullom Lake
- Lake Meadow, Madison County
- Meredosia Lake
- Mermet Lake State Fish and Wildlife Area
- Lake Michigan
- Mill Creek Lake, Clark County
- Miltmore Lake, Lake County
- Monee Reservoir, Will County
- Mud Lake (disambiguation)
- Murphy Lake (reservoir), Cook County
- Lake Murphysboro State Park (reservoir), Jackson County

== N ==
- Newton Lake State Fish and Wildlife Area (reservoir), Jasper County
- Lake Napa Suwe, Wauconda
- Nippersink Lake, Lake County

== O ==
- Lake Opeka, Des Plaines, Cook County
- Otter Lake (reservoir), Macoupin County

== P–Q ==
- Papoose Lake, Cook County
- Lake Paradise (reservoir), Coles County
- Peoria Lake, Peoria and Tazewell Counties
- Petite Lake, Lake County
- Pierce Lake, a man-made lake in Rock Cut State Park
- Pistakee Lake
- Potomac Lake, Lake County
- Pana Lake, a man made lake Christian and Shelby Counties
- Paragon Lake, also a man made lake in Christian County Pittsfield Lake

Pike County,Illinois

== R ==
- Raccoon Lake, Marion County
- Ramsey Lake (reservoir), Fayette County
- Redwing Slough Lake, Lake County
- Rend Lake (reservoir), Franklin and Jefferson Counties
- Rice Lake, Fulton County
- Round Lake, Lake County

== S ==
- Saganashkee Slough, Cook County
- Saint Marys Lake near Mundelein, Lake County
- Sam Dale Lake (reservoir), Wayne County
- Sand Lake, Lake County
- Sangchris Lake (reservoir), Christian and Sangamon Counties
- Lake Sara near Effingham
- Senachwine Lake
- Shabbona Lake (reservoir), DeKalb County
- Shagbark Lake Near Des Plaines River, Illinois
- Lake Shelbyville (reservoir), Shelby and Moultrie Counties
- Silver Lake, Lake County
- Skokie Lagoons (reservoir), Cook County
- Slough Lake, Lake County
- Spoon Lake near Dahinda
- Spring Lake State Fish and Wildlife Area
- Lake Springfield (reservoir), Sangamon County
- Sterling Lake, Lake County
- Lake Storey, Galesburg, Illinois
- Lake Summerset (reservoir), Stephenson and Winnebago Counties
- Sun Lake, Lake County
- Sylvan Lake, Lake County

== T ==
- Lake Taylorville (reservoir), Christian County
- Third Lake
- Lake Thunderbird (reservoir), Putnam County 41°12′25″N 89°26′49″W
- Tower Lakes
- Timberlake, Barrington, Lake County, Illinois

== U ==
- Upper Peoria Lake

== V ==
- Valley Lake (Illinois), Lake County. 42°20′57″N 87°58′58″W
- Vandalia Lake (reservoir), Fayette County. 38°59′59″N 89°09′52″W
- Lake Vermilion (reservoir), Vermilion County
- Vermont New Lake (reservoir), McDonough County. 40°18′18″N 90°27′42″W

== W–Y ==
- Washington County State Lake
- Waterford Lake near Lake Villa
- Waverly Lake. Morgan County
- West Frankfort Lake, Franklin County
- Lake Wildwood (reservoir), Marshall County near Varna. 41°03′55″N 89°16′44″W
- Wolf Lake, Cook County
- Wonder Lake, McHenry County
- Woodhaven Lakes, Lee County
- Wooster Lake, Lake County

== Z ==
- Lake Zurich, Lake County

== Former lakes ==
- Lake Kanagga, Effingham County

== See also ==
- List of rivers of Illinois
