= Lake Killarney =

Lake Killarney may refer to:

- Lake Killarney (Illinois)
- Lake Killarney (Louisiana), located within Louisiana State Penitentiary
- Lake Killarney (Missouri)
- Lake Killarney (Washington)
- Lake Killarney (Bahamas), New Providence Island
- Lakes of Killarney, Ireland
- Lake Killarney (New Zealand), lake in Tākaka
