= Canton Lake =

Canton Lake may refer to:

- Canton Lake (Oklahoma), lake in Blaine and Dewey counties in Oklahoma
- Canton Lake (Illinois), freshwater reservoir in Fulton County, Illinois
