= Pigeon Grove Township, Iroquois County, Illinois =

Pigeon Grove Township
- Township
- Location in Iroquois County

- Iroquois County's location in Illinois
- Coordinates: 40°32′02″N 87°56′26″W
- Country: United States
- State: Illinois
- County: Iroquois
- Established: September 1875

Area
  - Total: 35.86 sq mi (92.9 km^{2})
  - Land: 35.86 sq mi (92.9 km^{2})
  - Water: 0 sq mi (0 km^{2}) 0%
- Elevation: 690 ft (210 m)

Population (2020)
  - Total: 1,103
  - Density: 30.76/sq mi (11.88/km^{2})
- Time zone: UTC-6 (CST)
  - Summer (DST): UTC-5 (CDT)
- ZIP codes: 60918, 60924, 60948, 60960
- FIPS code: 17-075-59767

Pigeon Grove Township is one of twenty-six townships in Iroquois County, Illinois, USA. As of the 2020 census, its population was 1,103 and it contained 556 housing units. Pigeon Grove Township was formed from portions of Loda Township and Fountain Creek in September 1875.

== Geography ==
According to the 2021 census gazetteer files, Pigeon Grove Township has a total area of 35.86 square miles (92.88 km^{2}), all land.

=== Cities, towns, villages ===
- Cissna Park

=== Major highways ===
- Illinois Route 49

== Demographics ==
As of the 2020 census there were 1,103 people, 512 households, and 325 families residing in the township. The population density was 30.76 inhabitants per square mile (11.88/km^{2}). There were 556 housing units at an average density of 15.50 per square mile (5.98/km^{2}). The racial makeup of the township was 97.10% White, 0.18% African American, 0.00% Native American, 0.18% Asian, 0.09% Pacific Islander, 0.54% from other races, and 1.90% from two or more races. Hispanic or Latino of any race were 2.90% of the population.

There were 512 households, out of which 25.00% had children under the age of 18 living with them, 56.05% were married couples living together, 6.25% had a female householder with no spouse present, and 36.52% were non-families. 34.80% of all households were made up of individuals, and 22.30% had someone living alone who was 65 years of age or older. The average household size was 2.24 and the average family size was 2.80.

The township's age distribution consisted of 23.9% under the age of 18, 9.1% from 18 to 24, 17.3% from 25 to 44, 20% from 45 to 64, and 29.5% who were 65 years of age or older. The median age was 43.7 years. For every 100 females, there were 86.4 males. For every 100 females age 18 and over, there were 88.7 males.

The median income for a household in the township was $53,750, and the median income for a family was $73,472. Males had a median income of $50,000 versus $30,625 for females. The per capita income for the township was $25,834. About 6.2% of families and 10.9% of the population were below the poverty line, including 19.4% of those under age 18 and 5.2% of those age 65 or over.

Historical population
Census	Pop.	Note	%±
2000	1,143		—
2010	1,155		1.0%
2020	1,103		−4.5%
U.S. Decennial Census

== School districts ==
- Cissna Park Community Unit School District 6
- Hoopeston Area Community Unit School District 11
- Paxton-Buckley-Loda Community Unit School District 10

== Political districts ==
- Illinois' 15th congressional district
- State House District 105
- State Senate District 53
