= Horseshoe Lake State Fish and Wildlife Area =

State park in Illinois, USA

- IUCN category IV (habitat/species management area)
- Location within Illinois Location within the United States
- Location: Alexander County, Illinois, USA
- Nearest city: Miller City, Illinois
- Coordinates: 37°07′50″N 89°19′59″W
- Area: 10,200 acres (4,128 ha)
- Governing body: Illinois Department of Natural Resources

Horseshoe Lake State Fish and Wildlife Area is an Illinois state park on 10,200 acres (4,128 ha) in Alexander County, Illinois, United States.

== Natural features ==
In April 1927, the Department of Conservation purchased 49 acres for development as a Canada goose sanctuary. Additional tracts of land were purchased to increase the size to today's 10,200 acres (4,128 ha). The topography is largely flat with shallow sloughs.

The Horseshoe Lake SFWA includes Horseshoe Lake.

=== Flora ===
Native southern hardwood forests and bald cypress, tupelo gum, swamp cottonwood, elm, and tulip poplar trees can be found in the area. Two large tracts have been dedicated as Illinois Nature Preserves and are used for scientific research and education. Common aquatic plants include buttonbush, lotus, duckweed, coontail, and water primrose.

=== Fauna ===
Canada goose can be found in the fall and winter seasons. Native mammals include white-tailed deer, red fox, gray fox, muskrat, beaver, fox squirrel, and gray squirrel. Reptiles include the cottonmouth snake, assorted water snakes, and various species of turtles. The lake contains fish such as carp, sucker, channel catfish, black bass, bluegill, redear sunfish, crappie, bowfin, and gar.

== Recreation ==
Four picnic areas with picnic tables and stoves are located around the park.

There are 38 Class A camping sites, 40 Class B/E camping sites, and 10 Class C sites available.

There are 4,190 acres (1,696 ha) available for hunting.
