= Horseshoe Lake (Alexander County, Illinois) =

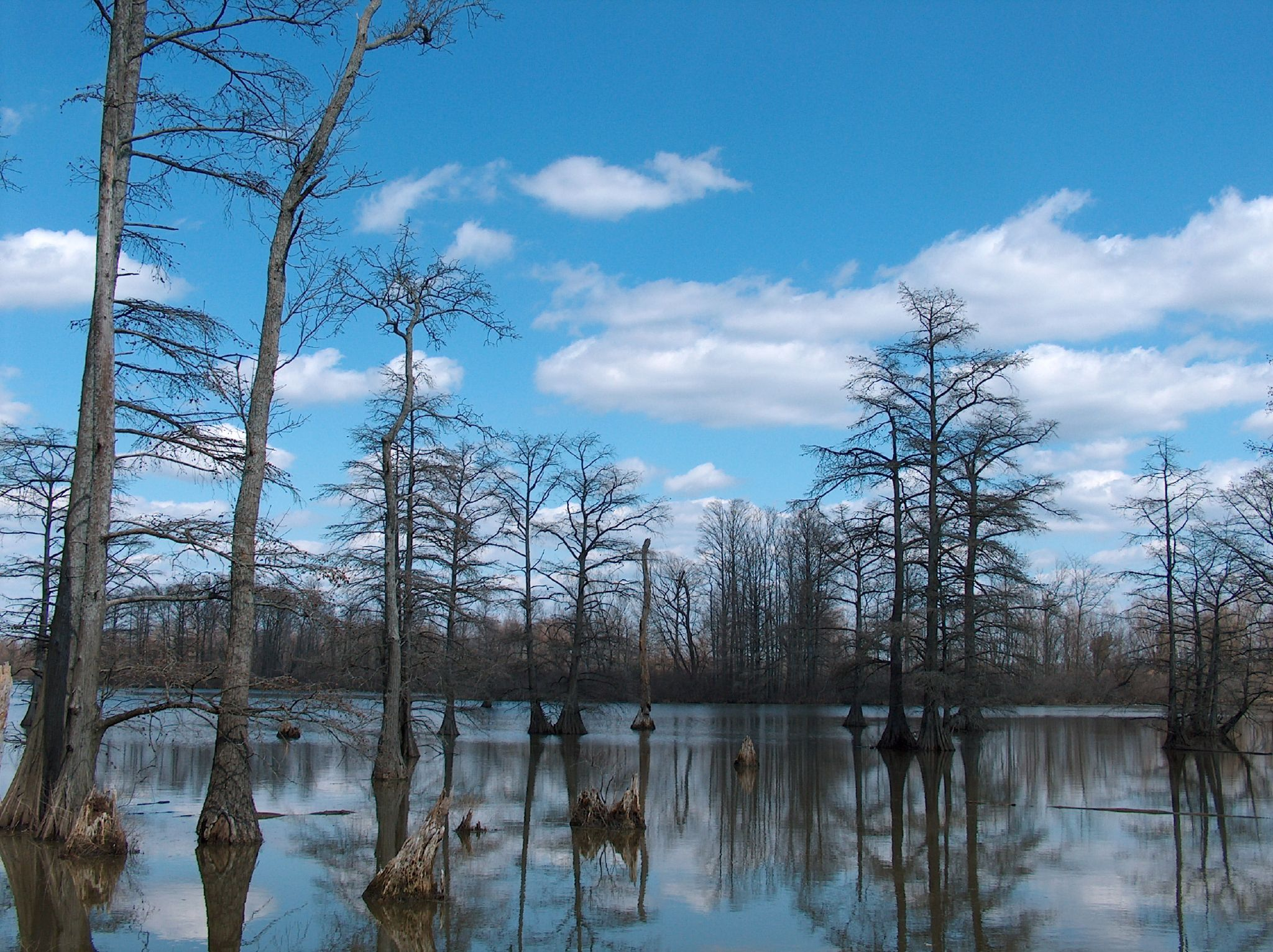

- Location within Illinois Location within the United States
- Location: Alexander County, Illinois, U.S.
- Coordinates: 37°08′56″N 089°21′18″W
- Type: Oxbow lake
- Basin countries: United States
- Surface area: 2,007 acres (812 ha)
- Average depth: 4 feet (1.2 m)
- Max. depth: 5–6 feet (1.5–1.8 m)
- Shore length^{1}: 20 miles (32 km)
- Surface elevation: 322 ft (98 m)

U.S. National Natural Landmark
- Designated: 1972
- ^{1} Shore length is not a well-defined measure.

Horseshoe Lake is a 2,007 acres (812 ha) natural oxbow lake in Alexander County, Illinois. It is the site of Illinois's Horseshoe Lake State Fish and Wildlife Area, a state park 10,645 acres (43 km^{2}) in size. It has a 20 miles (32 km) shoreline and a depth of 4 ft (1.2 m), with a maximum depth of 5–6 feet (1.5–1.8 m). A remnant of a large meander of the Mississippi River, it is today a shallow, isolated patch of water located near Cairo and the southern tip of Illinois. In 1972, the Horseshoe Lake Nature Preserve was designated as a National Natural Landmark by the National Park Service.

The Alexander County lake has major problems with siltation. During the Great Flood of 1993 the river tried to shift back to the Horseshoe Lake meander, but returned to its modern channel after the flood subsided. Much of the lake resembles a swamp or bayou. This is one of the northernmost parts of the natural ranges of the Bald cypress and Tupelo trees, which are found on the shoreline of the lake. Another tree found here is the swamp cottonwood. There is a good growth of the flowering American lotus.

Other northern stands of Bald Cypress occur in southern Maryland and Delaware. These are some of the most northerly occurrences of the Bald Cypress trees. The site in Maryland, Battle Creek Cypress Swamp, is more than one degree further north. This information does not relate to the Tupelo tree.

== See also ==
- List of lakes in Illinois
