= Lake Cunningham (Bahamas) =

Lake in the Bahamas

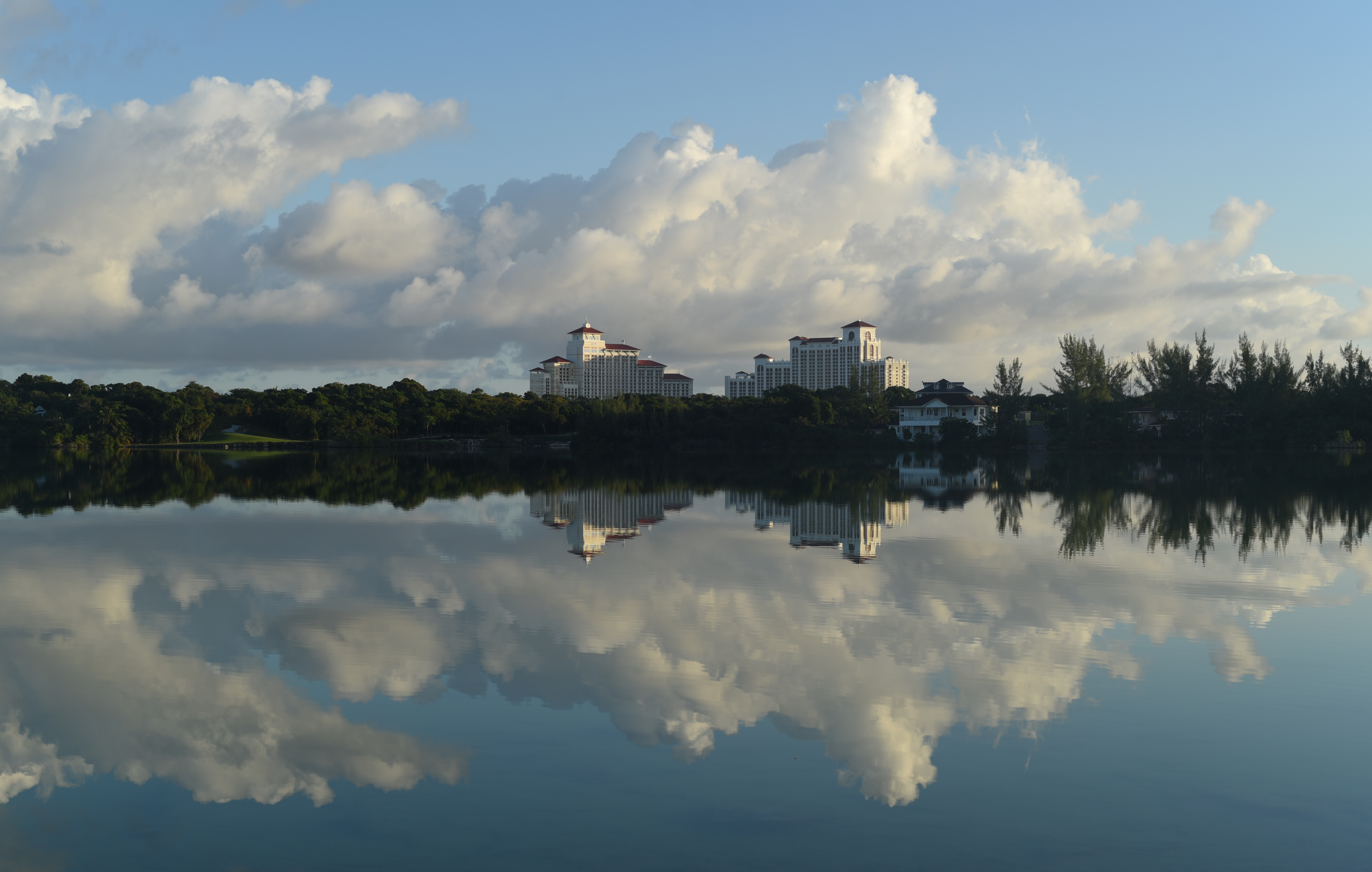
- View from the southern shore, facing north

- Location within Bahamas
- Interactive map of Lake Cunningham
- Location: New Providence
- Coordinates: 25°03′39″N 77°24′35″W
- Primary outflows: Land locked
- Basin countries: Bahamas
- Islands: Burnside Cay

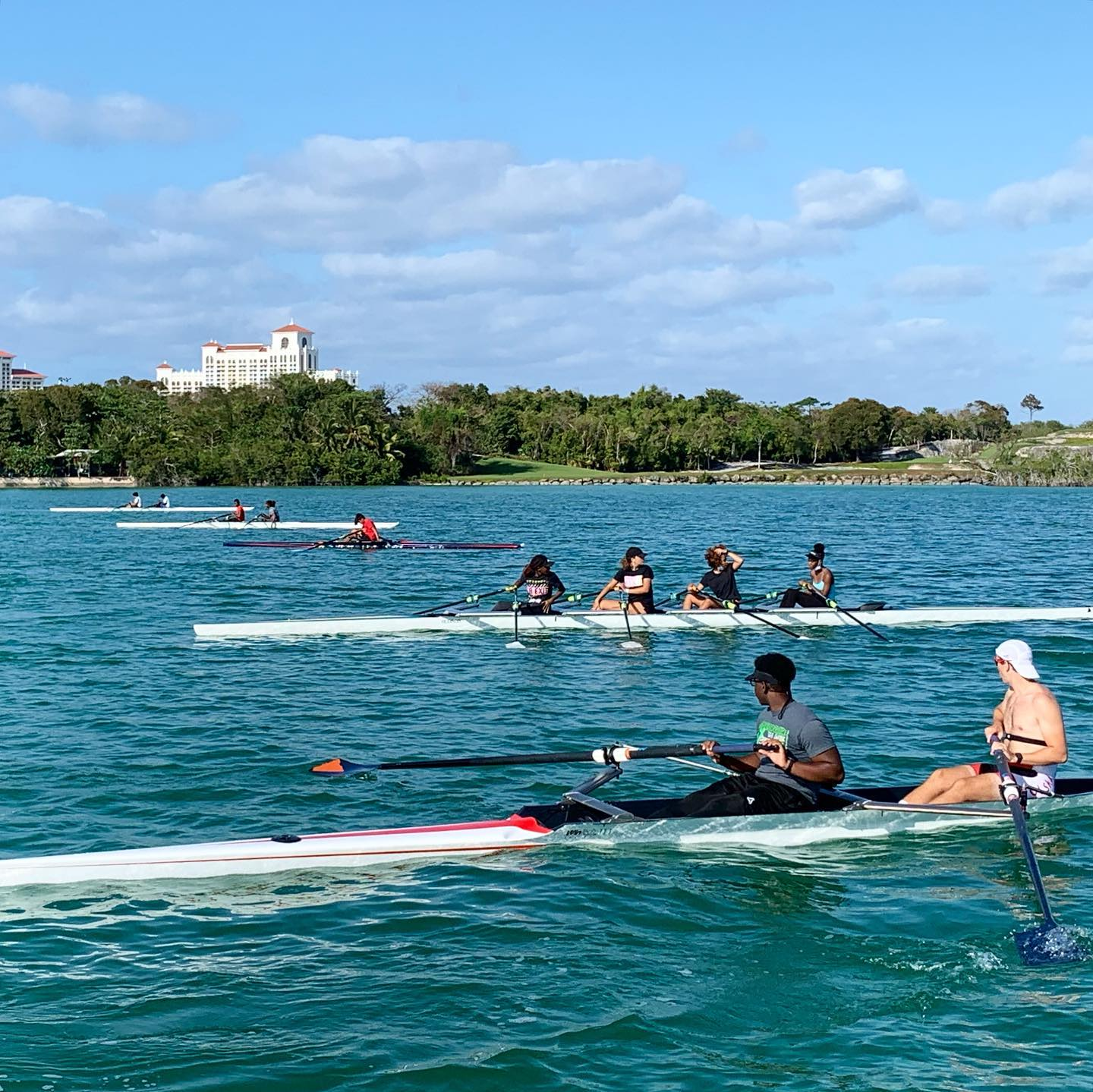
Nassau Rowing Club crews training on Lake Cunningham

Lake Cunningham is a lake on northern New Providence Island in the Bahamas and the second largest on the island after Lake Killarney.

== Ecology ==
Types of fish found in Lake Cunningham include largemouth bass, and black crappie, mountain mullet and Hardhead silverside

== Recreation ==
The Nassau Rowing Club was established at Lake Cunningham in 2012. The club hosts rowing regattas as well as competitive rowing lessons for various age and experience-levels. Other water sports that take place at the lake include jetskiing and kayaking.
