= Loda Township, Iroquois County, Illinois =

Loda Township
- Township
- Location in Iroquois County

- Iroquois County's location in Illinois
- Coordinates: 40°31′47″N 88°03′10″W
- Country: United States
- State: Illinois
- County: Iroquois
- Established: November 6, 1855

Area
  - Total: 39.07 sq mi (101.2 km^{2})
  - Land: 38.73 sq mi (100.3 km^{2})
  - Water: 0.34 sq mi (0.88 km^{2}) 0.86%
- Elevation: 738 ft (225 m)

Population (2020)
  - Total: 1,429
  - Density: 36.90/sq mi (14.25/km^{2})
- Time zone: UTC-6 (CST)
  - Summer (DST): UTC-5 (CDT)
- ZIP codes: 60918, 60924, 60948, 60957
- FIPS code: 17-075-44277

Loda Township is one of twenty-six townships in Iroquois County, Illinois, United States. As of the 2020 census, its population was 1,429 and it contained 791 housing units.

== Geography ==
According to the 2021 census gazetteer files, Loda Township has a total area of 39.07 square miles (101.19 km^{2}), of which 38.73 square miles (100.31 km^{2}) (or 99.14%) is land and 0.34 square miles (0.88 km^{2}) (or 0.86%) is water.

=== Cities, towns, villages ===
- Loda

=== Cemeteries ===
The township contains Pine Ridge Cemetery.

=== Major highways ===
- Interstate 57
- U.S. Route 45

=== Lakes ===
- Bayles Lake
- Lake Iroquois

== Demographics ==
As of the 2020 census there were 1,429 people, 690 households, and 508 families residing in the township. The population density was 36.58 inhabitants per square mile (14.12/km^{2}). There were 791 housing units at an average density of 20.25 per square mile (7.82/km^{2}). The racial makeup of the township was 92.79% White, 0.91% African American, 0.14% Native American, 0.35% Asian, 0.00% Pacific Islander, 0.56% from other races, and 5.25% from two or more races. Hispanic or Latino of any race were 3.29% of the population.

There were 690 households, out of which 34.80% had children under the age of 18 living with them, 66.67% were married couples living together, 4.64% had a female householder with no spouse present, and 26.38% were non-families. 24.10% of all households were made up of individuals, and 14.90% had someone living alone who was 65 years of age or older. The average household size was 2.40 and the average family size was 2.80.

The township's age distribution consisted of 22.6% under the age of 18, 9.4% from 18 to 24, 17.2% from 25 to 44, 27.5% from 45 to 64, and 23.3% who were 65 years of age or older. The median age was 45.2 years. For every 100 females, there were 118.3 males. For every 100 females age 18 and over, there were 105.9 males.

The median income for a household in the township was $69,167, and the median income for a family was $95,833. Males had a median income of $75,625 versus $38,438 for females. The per capita income for the township was $40,334. About 3.0% of families and 6.4% of the population were below the poverty line, including 7.6% of those under age 18 and 2.3% of those age 65 or over.

Historical population
Census	Pop.	Note	%±
2000	1,283		—
2010	1,461		13.9%
2020	1,429		−2.2%
U.S. Decennial Census

== School districts ==
- Cissna Park Community Unit School District 6
- Paxton-Buckley-Loda Community Unit School District 10

== Political districts ==
- Illinois' 15th congressional district
- State House District 105
- State Senate District 53
