= Lake Galena =

Lake Galena may refer to:

- Lake Galena (Illinois), a reservoir in Jo Daviess County, Illinois
- Lake Galena (Pennsylvania), a reservoir in Bucks County, Pennsylvania
