= Irene Beland =

American nursing educator and patient-centered care researcher

Irene L. Beland (June 21, 1906 – August 15, 2000) was an American nursing educator and patient-centered care researcher.

== Biography ==
Beland was born on June 21, 1906 in Loda, Illinois.

In 1913, her family moved to Osage, Iowa. After high school, she taught at a country school for two years, before enrolling in St. Mary's Hospital School of Nursing in Rochester, Minnesota. She earned her nursing diploma three years later. Beland was later accepted into the department of physics and biochemistry at the University of Minnesota, earning a bachelor's degree in 1937 and a master's degree in 1938. Her master's thesis was titled The comparative toxicities of the cardiac glucosides in the frog.

Beland taught medical nursing at the University of Minnesota from 1938 to 1940 and held teaching positions at St. Mary's Hospital School of Nursing and Minneapolis General Hospital from 1940 to 1947. From 1947 until her retirement in 1970, she held a faculty position at Wayne State University in Detroit, Michigan.

Beland is credited with developing one of the country's first graduate programs for medical-surgical nursing specialists. In 1965, Macmillan published the first edition of her book, Clinical Nursing: Pathophysiological and Psychosocial Approaches. The book was one of the first to examine nursing from a holistic perspective. Beland would go on to author or co-author three more editions of the text. In 1983, she was named an honorary fellow of the American Academy of Nursing.

Beland died on August 15, 2000, in Rochester, Minnesota. Her collection of papers is held at Boston University's Howard Gotlieb Archival Research Center.

== Selected works ==
=== Books ===
- Beland, Irene Leah; Matheney, Ruth Virginia (1960). Patient-centered approached to nursing. New York, N.Y: Macmillan. OCLC 1026419753.
- Beland, Irene L (1965). Clinical nursing: pathophysiological and psychosocial approaches. New York, N.Y.: Macmillan. OCLC 499694047.

=== Articles ===
- Beland, Irene L.; Moe, Gordon K.; Visscher, M.B. (1938). "Use of Aluminum Metal in Contact with Blood in Perfusion Systems". Experimental Biology and Medicine. 39 (1): 145–147. doi:10.3181/00379727-39-10122. ISSN 1535-3702.
- Maureen, M.; Beland, Irene (1946). "The Nurse and the Diabetic Patient". The American Journal of Nursing. 46 (9): 606. doi:10.2307/3457001. JSTOR 3457001.
- Hogan, Leola; Beland, Irene (1976). "Cervical Spine Syndrome". The American Journal of Nursing. 76 (7): 1104–1107. doi:10.2307/3423844. JSTOR 3423844. PMID 1047605.
