= Arthur Roe (politician) =

American politician

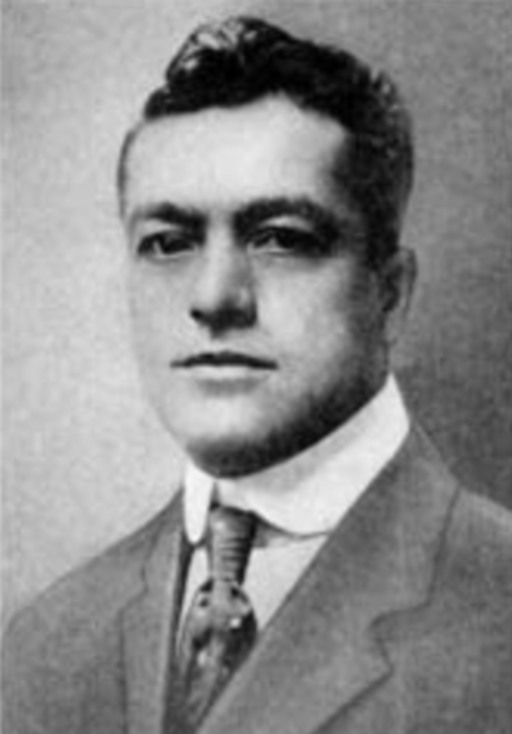
- Roe in 1925 as a State Representative

United States Attorney for the Eastern District of Illinois
- In office 1935–1942
- Preceded by: Harold Griffith Baker
- Succeeded by: Carl W. Feickert

Personal details
- Born: July 18, 1878 Shafter, Illinois
- Died: April 17, 1942 (aged 63) East Saint Louis, Illinois
- Party: Democratic
- Education: University of Illinois
- Occupation: Lawyer; Politician

Arthur Roe (July 18, 1878 – April 17, 1942) was an American politician and lawyer.

== Biography ==
Born in Shafter, Illinois, Roe moved with his parents to Vandalia, Illinois. Roe received his law degree from University of Illinois Law School. He was the city attorney of Vandalia, Illinois and master of chancery of Fayette County, Illinois from 1911 to 1913. Roe was a Democrat. From 1913 until 1935, Roe served in the Illinois House of Representatives and was speaker of the house in 1933. In 1935, Roe was appointed United States Attorney for the United States District Court for the Eastern District of Illinois. Roe was still in that office when he died of a heart ailment in East Saint Louis, Illinois.
