= Druce Lake =

- Location within Illinois Location within the United States
- Location: Lake County, Illinois
- Coordinates: 42.36799°N 88.00471°W
- Type: lake
- Surface elevation: 765 feet (233 m)

Druce Lake is a lake in Lake County, Illinois in the U.S. state found at an elevation of 764 feet (233 m).

Druce Lake bears the name of Alexander Druce. A community called Druce Lake also lies nearby.

Bathing scene at Druce Lake, Grays Like, Ill in about 1924

== See also ==
- List of lakes in Illinois
