= Lake Kanagga =

Former reservoir in Illinois, United States

- Location within Illinois
- Location: Effingham County, Illinois, United States
- Coordinates: 39°06′34″N 88°34′35″W

Lake Kanagga was a 20-acre lake, located in Effingham County, Illinois. The lake was built to supply steam locomotive trains, but was later used as a recreation lake. Homes were built near Lake Kanagga. Lake Kanagga was originally called Lake Knagge, after John Knagge who sold the property to the Vandalia Railroad Company. After the sale the name was changed to a more phonetic spelling. However, after Lake Sara was built in 1957, Lake Kanagga was used less. In the 1960s the lake begin to fill with sediment and the nearby homes and piers were demolished. In the 1990s the lake was drained, filled, and sold to the city of Effingham, Illinois. Lake Kanagga is now vacant land.
