= Bear Grove Township, Fayette County, Illinois =

Bear Grove Township
- Township
- Location in Fayette County

- Fayette County's location in Illinois
- Coordinates: 38°57′38″N 89°11′29″W
- Country: United States
- State: Illinois
- County: Fayette
- Established: 1859

Area
  - Total: 37.41 sq mi (96.9 km^{2})
  - Land: 37.35 sq mi (96.7 km^{2})
  - Water: 0.06 sq mi (0.16 km^{2}) 0.16%
- Elevation: 520 ft (160 m)

Population (2020)
  - Total: 553
  - Density: 14.8/sq mi (5.72/km^{2})
- Time zone: UTC-6 (CST)
  - Summer (DST): UTC-5 (CDT)
- ZIP codes: 62262, 62471
- FIPS code: 17-051-04377

Bear Grove Township is one of twenty townships in Fayette County, Illinois, USA. As of the 2020 census, its population was 553 and it contained 232 housing units. The township was originally known as Johnson Township.

== Geography ==
According to the 2021 census gazetteer files, Bear Grove Township has a total area of 37.41 square miles (96.89 km^{2}), of which 37.35 square miles (96.74 km^{2}) (or 99.84%) is land and 0.06 square miles (0.16 km^{2}) (or 0.16%) is water.

=== Unincorporated towns ===
- Hagarstown

=== Extinct towns ===
- Jimtown

=== Cemeteries ===
The township contains these five cemeteries: Bethlehem, Eakle, Evans, McInturff and Wright and Neathery.

=== Major highways ===
- Interstate 70
- U.S. Route 40
- Illinois Route 140

=== Airports and landing strips ===
- Lutz Airport
- Vandalia Municipal Airport

=== Lakes ===
- Vandalia Lake

== Demographics ==
As of the 2020 census there were 553 people, 261 households, and 240 families residing in the township. The population density was 14.78 inhabitants per square mile (5.71/km^{2}). There were 232 housing units at an average density of 6.20 per square mile (2.39/km^{2}). The racial makeup of the township was 96.93% White, 0.18% African American, 0.00% Native American, 0.36% Asian, 0.00% Pacific Islander, 0.00% from other races, and 2.53% from two or more races. Hispanic or Latino of any race were 1.08% of the population.

There were 261 households, out of which 50.60% had children under the age of 18 living with them, 73.56% were married couples living together, 18.39% had a female householder with no spouse present, and 8.05% were non-families. 6.50% of all households were made up of individuals, and 2.30% had someone living alone who was 65 years of age or older. The average household size was 3.08 and the average family size was 3.24.

The township's age distribution consisted of 35.1% under the age of 18, 3.9% from 18 to 24, 26.1% from 25 to 44, 25.8% from 45 to 64, and 9.2% who were 65 years of age or older. The median age was 31.1 years. For every 100 females, there were 98.0 males. For every 100 females age 18 and over, there were 85.1 males.

The median income for a household in the township was $83,203, and the median income for a family was $84,219. Males had a median income of $52,679 versus $31,793 for females. The per capita income for the township was $26,072. About 7.5% of families and 10.9% of the population were below the poverty line, including 19.1% of those under age 18 and 0.0% of those age 65 or over.

Historical population
| Census | Pop. | Note | %± |
|---|---|---|---|
| 2000 | 591 | | — |
| 2010 | 599 | | 1.4% |
| 2020 | 553 | | −7.7% |
U.S. Decennial Census

== School districts ==
- Mulberry Grove Community Unit School District 1
- Vandalia Community Unit School District 203

== Political districts ==
- Illinois' 19th congressional district
- State House District 102
- State Senate District 51
