= Hagarstown, Illinois =

Unincorporated community in Illinois, United States

- Unincorporated community
- Location within Illinois Location within the United States
- Coordinates: 38°56′36″N 89°10′06″W
- Country: United States
- State: Illinois
- County: Fayette
- Township: Bear Grove
- Elevation: 531 ft (162 m)
- Time zone: UTC-6 (Central (CST))
  - Summer (DST): UTC-5 (CDT)
- ZIP code: 62247
- Area code: 618
- GNIS feature ID: 409606

Hagarstown is an unincorporated community in Fayette County, Illinois, United States. Hagarstown is 4.5 miles (7.2 km) southwest of Vandalia. Hagarstown has a post office with ZIP code 62247.
