= Galena River (Illinois) =

Galena River Rivière aux Fèves
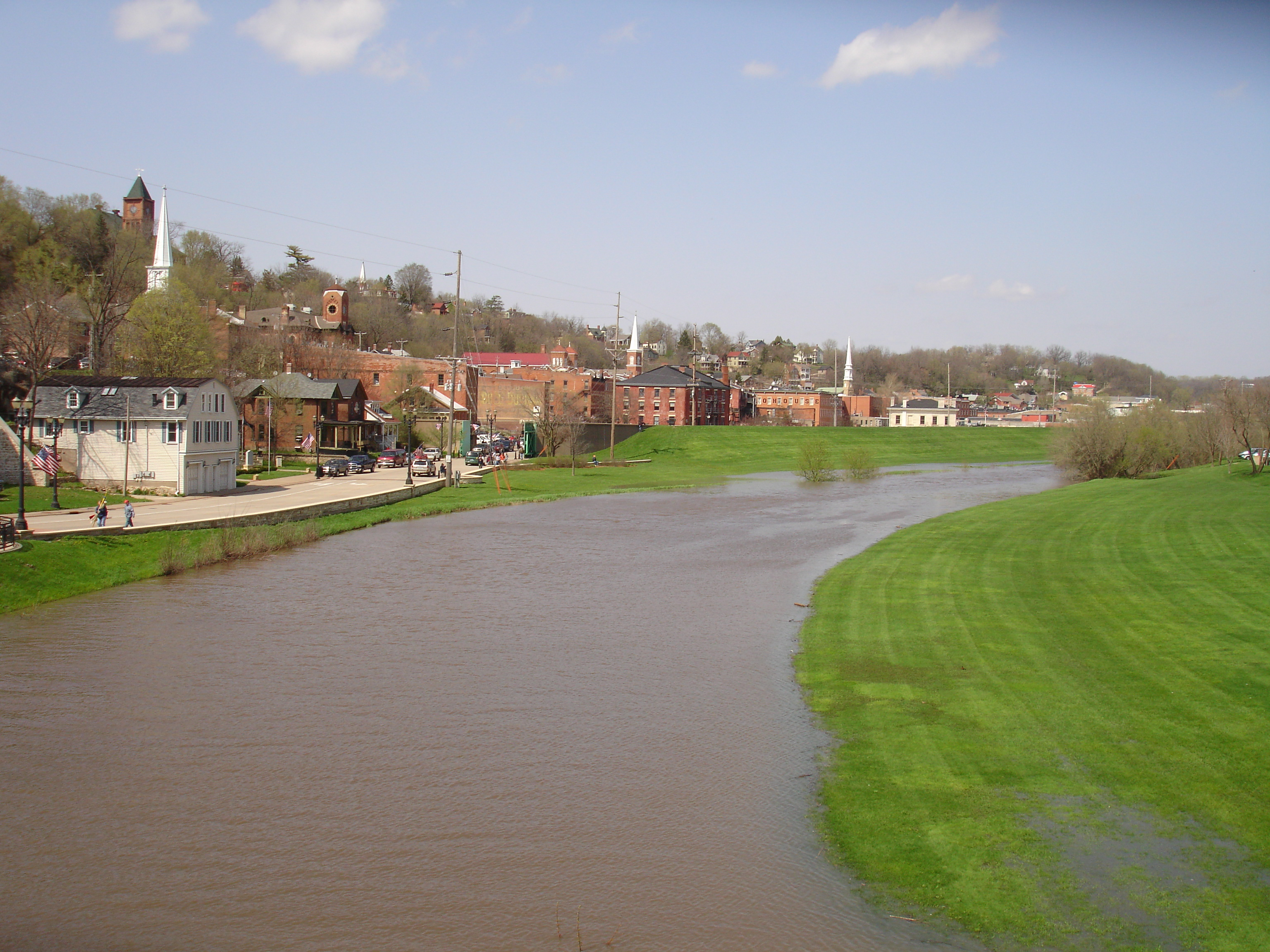
- The Galena River flowing through downtown Galena, Illinois in April 2008. Note the city floodgates in center connecting to the river levee system on the right

Physical characteristics
- Source
  - location: Lafayette County northwest of Belmont, Wisconsin
  - coordinates: 42°45′17″N 90°23′04″W
  - elevation: 1,153 ft (351 m)
- Mouth
  - location: Confluence with the Mississippi southwest of Galena, Illinois
  - coordinates: 42°22′27″N 90°26′46″W
  - elevation: 591 ft (180 m)
- Length: 52 mi (84 km)

Basin features
- Progression: Galena River → Mississippi → Gulf of Mexico
- GNIS ID: 426934

The Galena River, also known as the Fevre or Fever River, is a 52.4-mile-long (84.3 km) river which flows through the Midwestern United States.

== Geography ==
The river rises in Lafayette County, Wisconsin, northwest of Belmont. It enters Illinois in Jo Daviess County to flow through the city of Galena before it joins the upper Mississippi River a few miles south and west. The river is part of the Driftless Area of Illinois and Wisconsin. This region was ice-free during the Wisconsin glaciation and underwent hundreds of thousands of years of glacial-free erosion. The river also occupies a substantial canyon.

== History ==
The indigenous name for the river was "Maucaubee" which if translated means "fever" or "fever that blisters", the indigenous term for smallpox.

The indigenous gave it this name because in the early days of this country, some of the warriors existing on the present site of Galena and the banks of a small creek a little south of town, went to the assistance of their eastern brothers. On their return, they brought with them a disease that they named "Maucaubee", the fever that blistered. Hundreds of natives died, and the Indians named both the river and the stream Small Pox River.

The smaller creek is still named Small Pox Creek while European settlers changed the river's name to "Fever River", and the frontier hamlet was known as the "Fever River Settlement" or LaPointe until 1826 or 1827 when it was given the name "Galena".

The name "Bean River" came about from the fact that the early French traders and adventurers, who undoubtedly were in the area long before the 1820s, changed the Indian name to "Riviere au Feve", which means "river of the bean". As early as 1822, the "City" of Galena was mentioned in newspapers while Chicago was referred to simply as "a village in Pike County containing 12 or 15 houses and about 60 or 70 inhabitants". Galena was more important commercially than Chicago at this time; it served as a trading point and provided work at its nearby lead mines. At Fever River, the federal government with military backing was successful in negotiations with the Fox and Sauk nations in securing mining rights in their country in June 1822.

The river is officially named the "Fever River" in Wisconsin since May 14, 1992 due to the enactment of Act 284.

=== Winnebago War ===
The Winnebago War of 1827, also known as the "Fevre River War", is associated with this river.

== See also ==
- Lake Galena
- List of Illinois rivers
- List of Wisconsin rivers
