= Shafter, Illinois =

- Unincorporated community
- Location within Illinois Location within the United States
- Coordinates: 39°00′49″N 89°11′06″W
- Country: United States
- State: Illinois
- County: Fayette
- Township: Shafter
- Elevation: 561 ft (171 m)
- Time zone: UTC-6 (Central (CST))
  - Summer (DST): UTC-5 (CDT)
- Area code: 618
- GNIS feature ID: 423179

Shafter is an unincorporated community in Fayette County, Illinois, United States.

== Notable person ==
- Arthur Roe, Illinois legislator and lawyer, was born in Shafter.
