= Shafter Township, Fayette County, Illinois =

Shafter Township
- Township
- Location in Fayette County

- Fayette County's location in Illinois
- Coordinates: 39°02′38″N 89°11′09″W
- Country: United States
- State: Illinois
- County: Fayette
- Established: December 1920

Area
  - Total: 36.26 sq mi (93.9 km^{2})
  - Land: 35.59 sq mi (92.2 km^{2})
  - Water: 0.67 sq mi (1.7 km^{2}) 1.85%
- Elevation: 574 ft (175 m)

Population (2020)
  - Total: 466
  - Density: 13.1/sq mi (5.06/km^{2})
- Time zone: UTC-6 (CST)
  - Summer (DST): UTC-5 (CDT)
- ZIP codes: 62011, 62080, 62262, 62471
- FIPS code: 17-051-68926

Shafter Township is one of twenty townships in Fayette County, Illinois, USA. As of the 2020 census, its population was 466 and it contained 207 housing units. Shafter Township was formed out of Sharon Township in December, 1920.

== Geography ==
According to the 2021 census gazetteer files, Shafter Township has a total area of 36.26 square miles (93.91 km^{2}), of which 35.59 square miles (92.18 km^{2}) (or 98.15%) is land and 0.67 square miles (1.74 km^{2}) (or 1.85%) is water.

=== Extinct towns ===
- Shafter

=== Cemeteries ===
The township contains these seven cemeteries: Brackenbush, Browning, Cook, Hoffman, Holy Cross Lutheran, Lawler and Rush.

=== Major highways ===
- Illinois Route 185

=== Lakes ===
- Vandalia Lake

== Demographics ==
As of the 2020 census there were 466 people, 287 households, and 221 families residing in the township. The population density was 12.85 inhabitants per square mile (4.96/km^{2}). There were 207 housing units at an average density of 5.71 per square mile (2.20/km^{2}). The racial makeup of the township was 95.71% White, 0.21% African American, 0.00% Native American, 0.43% Asian, 0.00% Pacific Islander, 0.00% from other races, and 3.65% from two or more races. Hispanic or Latino of any race were 0.64% of the population.

There were 287 households, out of which 54.70% had children under the age of 18 living with them, 54.01% were married couples living together, 2.09% had a female householder with no spouse present, and 23.00% were non-families. 23.00% of all households were made up of individuals, and 9.80% had someone living alone who was 65 years of age or older. The average household size was 2.79 and the average family size was 2.99.

The township's age distribution consisted of 25.7% under the age of 18, 4.6% from 18 to 24, 27.1% from 25 to 44, 33.1% from 45 to 64, and 9.5% who were 65 years of age or older. The median age was 42.7 years. For every 100 females, there were 111.3 males. For every 100 females age 18 and over, there were 120.4 males.

The median income for a household in the township was $80,524, and the median income for a family was $64,071. Males had a median income of $62,778 versus $25,083 for females. The per capita income for the township was $34,171. About 9.0% of families and 6.6% of the population were below the poverty line, including 4.4% of those under age 18 and 17.1% of those age 65 or over.

Historical population
Census	Pop.	Note	%±
2000	430		—
2010	485		12.8%
2020	466		−3.9%
U.S. Decennial Census

== School districts ==
- Ramsey Community Unit School District 204
- Vandalia Community Unit School District 203

== Political districts ==
- Illinois' 19th congressional district
- State House District 102
- State Senate District 51
