= Kidd Lake State Natural Area =

State park in Illinois, USA

- IUCN category V (protected landscape/seascape)
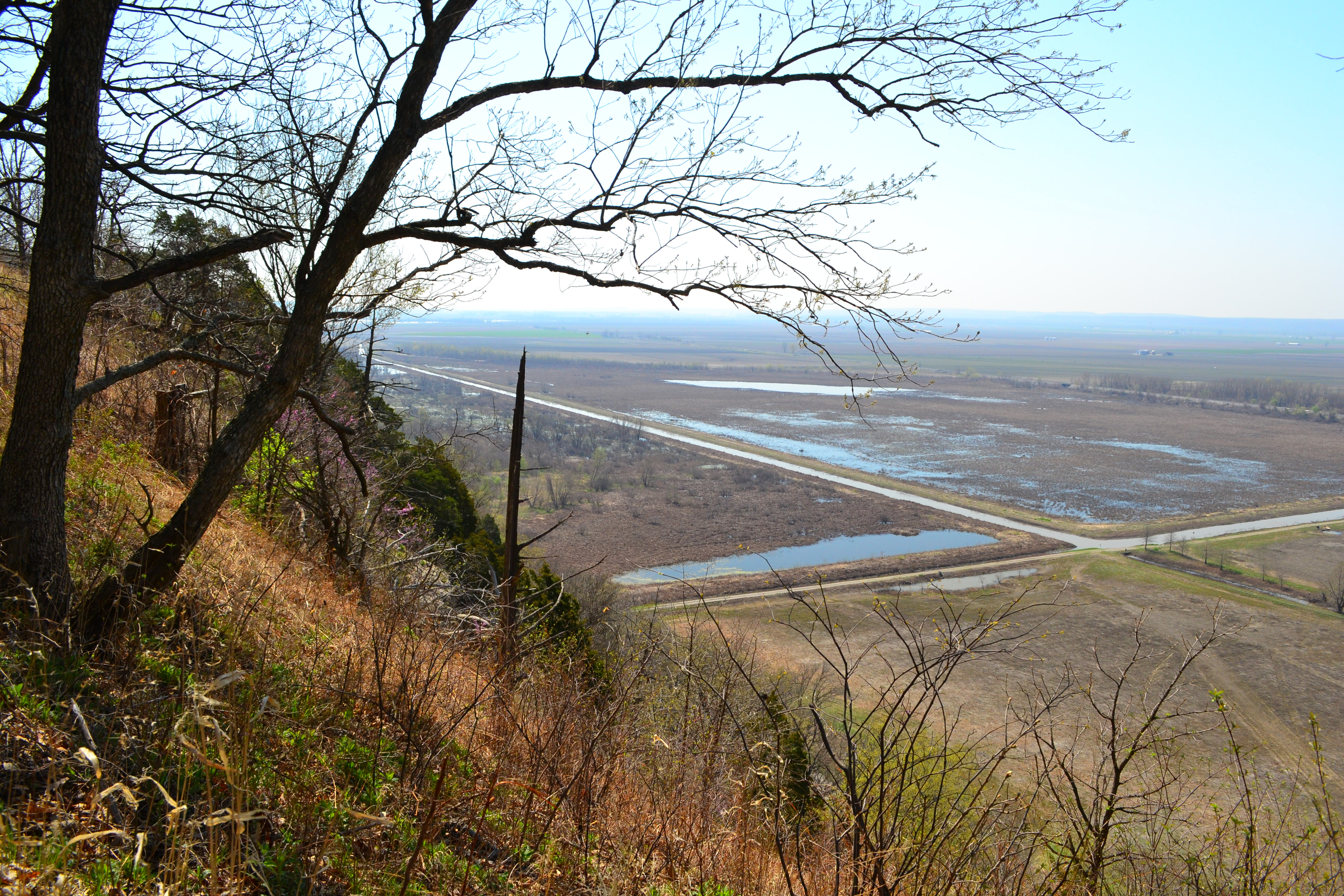
- Part of Kidd Lake Marsh viewed from Fults Hill Prairie

- Location within Illinois Location within the United States
- Location: Monroe County, Illinois, U.S.
- Nearest city: Chester, Illinois
- Coordinates: 38°8′44″N 90°12′26″W
- Area: 800 acres (324 ha)
- Established: October 1970
- Governing body: Illinois Department of Natural Resources
- Website: www.dnr.state.il.us/lands/Landmgt/PARKS/R4/fhp.htm

Kidd Lake State Natural Area is a protected area of Illinois on 800 acres (324 ha) in Monroe County, Illinois, United States, adjacent to the Fults Hill Prairie State Natural Area.

Kidd Lake State Natural Area is an example of the once expansive wetlands of the Mississippi floodplain known as the American Bottoms. The marsh was historically part of an 800-acre (324 ha) lake bed, and was once home to a variety of wetland birds, some now rare in Illinois. It is an important rest stop for migrating waterfowl and continues to provide critical habitat to a diverse range of birds, as well as amphibians and reptiles.
