= Cissna Park, Illinois =

- Village
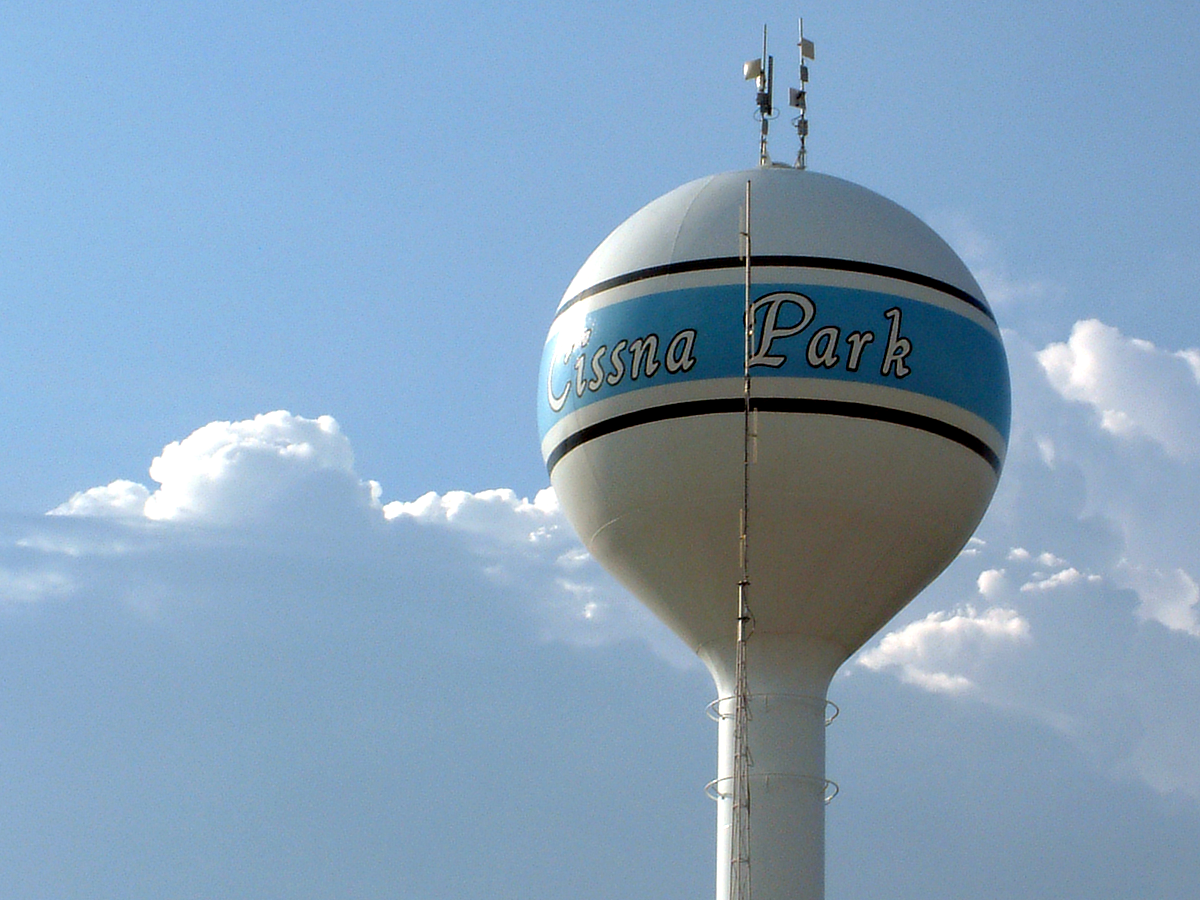
- The Cissna Park water tower

- Location of Cissna Park in Iroquois County, Illinois

- Location in Iroquois County
- Coordinates: 40°34′01″N 87°53′32″W
- Country: United States
- State: Illinois
- County: Iroquois
- Township: Pigeon Grove

Area
  - Total: 0.73 sq mi (1.88 km^{2})
  - Land: 0.73 sq mi (1.88 km^{2})
  - Water: 0 sq mi (0.00 km^{2})
- Elevation: 663 ft (202 m)

Population (2020)
  - Total: 817
  - Density: 1,127.2/sq mi (435.22/km^{2})
- Time zone: UTC-6 (CST)
  - Summer (DST): UTC-5 (CDT)
- ZIP code: 60924
- Area code: 815
- FIPS code: 17-14468
- GNIS feature ID: 2397627
- Website: https://cissnapark.com/

Cissna Park is a village in Pigeon Grove Township, Iroquois County, Illinois, United States. The population was 817 at the 2020 census.

== Geography ==
Cissna Park is located in southern Iroquois County. Illinois Route 49 passes through the village, leading north 16 miles (26 km) to Crescent City and south 7 miles (11 km) to Rankin.

According to the 2021 census gazetteer files, Cissna Park has a total area of 0.73 square miles (1.89 km^{2}), all land.

== Demographics ==
Historical population
Census	Pop.	Note	%±
1900	623		—
1910	652		4.7%
1920	670		2.8%
1930	588		−12.2%
1940	582		−1.0%
1950	660		13.4%
1960	803		21.7%
1970	773		−3.7%
1980	825		6.7%
1990	805		−2.4%
2000	811		0.7%
2010	846		4.3%
2020	817		−3.4%
U.S. Decennial Census

As of the 2020 census there were 817 people, 404 households, and 239 families residing in the village. The population density was 1,126.90 inhabitants per square mile (435.10/km^{2}). There were 446 housing units at an average density of 615.17 per square mile (237.52/km^{2}). The racial makeup of the village was 97.67% White, 0.12% African American, 0.00% Native American, 0.24% Asian, 0.12% Pacific Islander, 0.49% from other races, and 1.35% from two or more races. Hispanic or Latino of any race were 2.20% of the population.

There were 404 households, out of which 19.1% had children under the age of 18 living with them, 50.00% were married couples living together, 7.92% had a female householder with no husband present, and 40.84% were non-families. 40.84% of all households were made up of individuals, and 28.22% had someone living alone who was 65 years of age or older. The average household size was 2.73 and the average family size was 2.06.

The village's age distribution consisted of 20.0% under the age of 18, 3.7% from 18 to 24, 20.4% from 25 to 44, 21.6% from 45 to 64, and 34.4% who were 65 years of age or older. The median age was 51.0 years. For every 100 females, there were 75.0 males. For every 100 females age 18 and over, there were 80.3 males.

The median income for a household in the village was $42,750, and the median income for a family was $71,023. Males had a median income of $48,333 versus $35,179 for females. The per capita income for the village was $26,126. About 8.4% of families and 12.6% of the population were below the poverty line, including 28.2% of those under age 18 and 6.2% of those age 65 or over.
