= Lake Iroquois (Illinois) =

- Location within Illinois Location within the United States
- Location: Iroquois County, Illinois
- Coordinates: 40°32′24″N 88°05′42″W
- Type: reservoir
- Primary inflows: none (spring fed)
- Primary outflows: none (spring fed)
- Basin countries: United States
- Max. length: 0.5 mi (0.80 km)
- Max. width: 0.3 mi (0.48 km)
- Surface area: 65 acres (26 ha)
- Average depth: 8–15 ft (2.4–4.6 m)
- Max. depth: 35 ft (11 m)
- Surface elevation: 718 feet (219 m)
- Frozen: winter
- Settlements: Loda, Illinois

Lake Iroquois is a freshwater reservoir located in west Loda, Illinois in Iroquois County, 13.6 miles (21.9 km) from Onarga. The lake is 20–50 ft from Bayles Lake, the two lakes are separated by a road on the north side of Bayles Lake.

== Fishing ==
Lake Iroquois is annually stocked with many fish species. Fishermen will find a variety of fish including muskie, whitefish, carp, channel catfish, blue catfish, sunfish, largemouth bass, walleye, smallmouth bass, white catfish, striped bass, flathead catfish, crappie, bluegill, white bass, rock bass, bullhead, panfish, white perch here. Fishing is well known in this area being Lake Iroquois or Bayles Lake,
