= Lake Sara =

- Location within Illinois
- Location: Effingham County, Illinois, United States
- Coordinates: 39°08′10″N 88°37′59″W
- Type: Reservoir
- Basin countries: United States
- Surface area: 800 acres (320 ha)
- Surface elevation: 581 ft (177 m)

Lake Sara is an 800 acres (320 ha) reservoir located four miles west of the city of Effingham in Effingham County, Illinois.

Lake Sara's attractions include a two marinas, a public beach, two restaurants, various rental properties (including a camp ground), and several area golf courses. The lake offers boating, fishing, swimming, kayaking, and paddle boarding.

The lake was built and is owned by the Effingham Water Authority, a public entity established in 1955 by a 4–1 vote of Effingham City Council, in response to a water shortage felt throughout much of the Midwest at the time.

Named after an active benefactor (Sara Pearson), Lake Sara was publicly dedicated on November 10, 1957, following the delivery of a keynote address by Hon. William G. Stratton, Governor of Illinois.

Habitat enhancement structures were dropped in the Lake to attract aquatic life. The Effingham Water Authority has proposed a 30-acre recreation installment at the Lake as a way of transitioning the lake to a public park.
