= Lake Hillcrest =

- Location within Illinois Location within the United States
- Location: Madison County
- Coordinates: 38°44′54″N 89°59′36″W
- Type: reservoir
- Basin countries: United States
- Max. length: .593 mi (0.954 km)
- Max. width: 0.17 mi (0.27 km)
- Surface area: 20.4 acres (8.3 ha)
- Average depth: 10–15 ft (3.0–4.6 m)
- Max. depth: 44 ft (13 m)
- Shore length^{1}: 8.53 mi (13.73 km)
- Surface elevation: 509 ft (155 m)
- Islands: none
- Settlements: Hillcrest, Illinois
- ^{1} Shore length is not a well-defined measure.

Lake Hillcrest is a lake in Madison County, Illinois, United States.
