= Lake Bracken =

- Location within Illinois Location within the United States
- Location: Galesburg, Knox County, Illinois, United States
- Coordinates: 40°51′27.14″N 90°20′55.46″W
- Type: reservoir
- Basin countries: United States
- Surface area: 172 acres (70 ha)
- Surface elevation: 696 ft (212 m)

Lake Bracken is a reservoir in Galesburg, Knox County, Illinois, United States. Managed by the Lake Bracken Country Club, the lake was formed in 1921 with the damming of Brush Creek. It is part of the Spoon River drainage basin, and has a surface area of 172 acres (70 ha). Its "overall resource quality" was assessed as "fair" in 1996 by the Illinois Environmental Protection Agency. Channel catfish, largemouth bass, and carp are known to live in the lake.

Lake Bracken was originally formed by the CB&Q (now Burlington Northern) in order to supply its major "Shops" and "Yards" in Galesburg, Illinois with water for the steam locomotives and other machines, equipment, and systems requiring large amounts of water.
