= Waverly Lake =

- Location within Illinois Location within the United States
- Location: Morgan County
- Coordinates: 39°36′18″N 90°00′50″W
- Type: reservoir
- Primary outflows: Apple Creek
- Basin countries: United States
- Surface area: 112 acres (0.45 km^{2})
- Max. depth: 15 ft (4.6 m)
- Surface elevation: 623 ft (190 m)

Waverly Lake is a 112 acres (0.45 km^{2}) reservoir located in Morgan County in the U.S. state of Illinois. Located 3 miles northwest of Waverly, it provides recreational opportunities to the Morgan County municipality. The reservoir drains into Apple Creek, a tributary of the Illinois River. The lake is found at an elevation of 623 feet (190 m).

Waverly Lake is 15 feet (4.6 m) deep at its deepest point. Fish that can be caught here include bluegill, carp, channel catfish, largemouth bass, sucker, white crappie, yellow bass, and yellow bullhead.
