= Loda, Illinois =

- Village
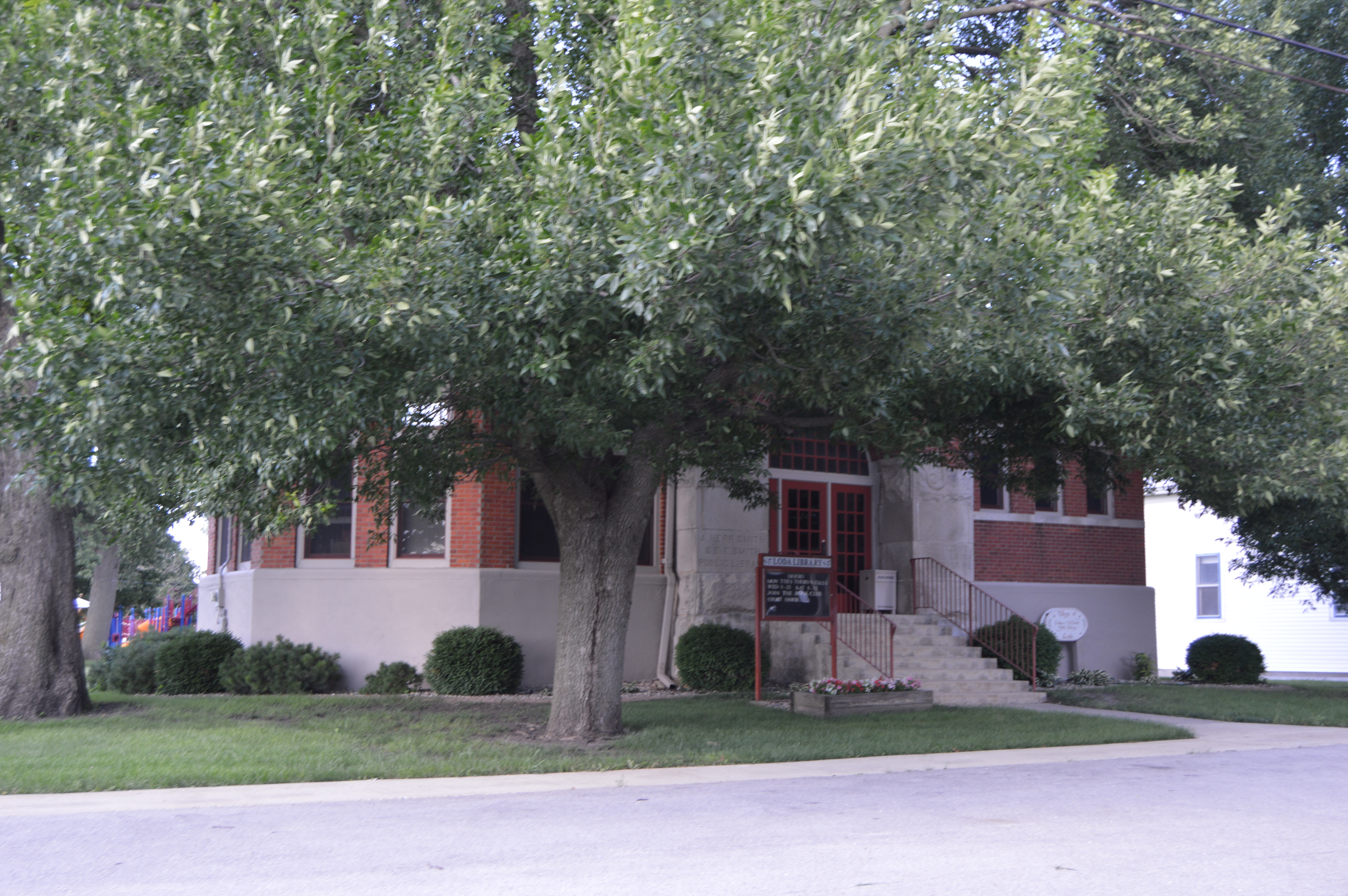
- Loda Township Library

- Location in Iroquois County, Illinois
- Coordinates: 40°30′57″N 88°04′32″W
- Country: United States
- State: Illinois
- County: Iroquois
- Township: Loda

Area
  - Total: 1.47 sq mi (3.82 km^{2})
  - Land: 1.47 sq mi (3.80 km^{2})
  - Water: 0.0077 sq mi (0.02 km^{2})
- Elevation: 771 ft (235 m)

Population (2020)
  - Total: 356
  - Density: 242.7/sq mi (93.72/km^{2})
- Time zone: UTC-6 (CST)
  - Summer (DST): UTC-5 (CDT)
- ZIP code: 60948
- Area code: 815
- FIPS code: 17-44264
- GNIS feature ID: 2398464
- Website: villageofloda.org

Loda is a village in Loda Township, Iroquois County, Illinois, United States. As of the 2020 census its population was 356.

== History ==
A post office called Loda has been in operation since 1880. The village derives its name from "Cath-Loda", a poem by Ossian.

== Geography ==
Loda is located in southwestern Iroquois County. U.S. Route 45 passes through the center of the village, leading north 6 miles (10 km) to Buckley and south 4 miles (6 km) to Paxton. Interstate 57 passes through the west side of Loda, but with no direct access.

According to the 2021 census gazetteer files, Loda has a total area of 1.48 square miles (3.83 km^{2}), of which 1.47 square miles (3.81 km^{2}) (or 99.46%) is land and 0.01 square miles (0.03 km^{2}) (or 0.54%) is water.

Bayles Lake is a freshwater reservoir located just west of Loda. The lake is an impoundment of Spring Creek, a north-flowing tributary of the Iroquois River, part of the Kankakee River watershed.

== Demographics ==
Historical population
Census	Pop.	Note	%±
1880	635		—
1890	598		−5.8%
1900	668		11.7%
1910	603		−9.7%
1920	530		−12.1%
1930	499		−5.8%
1940	507		1.6%
1950	559		10.3%
1960	585		4.7%
1970	525		−10.3%
1980	486		−7.4%
1990	390		−19.8%
2000	419		7.4%
2010	407		−2.9%
2020	356		−12.5%
U.S. Decennial Census

As of the 2020 census there were 356 people, 134 households, and 79 families residing in the village. The population density was 241.36 inhabitants per square mile (93.19/km^{2}). There were 166 housing units at an average density of 112.54 per square mile (43.45/km^{2}). The racial makeup of the village was 85.96% White, 1.97% African American, 0.28% Native American, 0.28% Asian, 0.00% Pacific Islander, 1.12% from other races, and 10.39% from two or more races. Hispanic or Latino of any race were 7.58% of the population.

There were 134 households, out of which 35.1% had children under the age of 18 living with them, 41.79% were married couples living together, 10.45% had a female householder with no husband present, and 41.04% were non-families. 36.57% of all households were made up of individuals, and 14.93% had someone living alone who was 65 years of age or older. The average household size was 3.20 and the average family size was 2.57.

The village's age distribution consisted of 27.8% under the age of 18, 9.9% from 18 to 24, 31.8% from 25 to 44, 18.9% from 45 to 64, and 11.6% who were 65 years of age or older. The median age was 33.8 years. For every 100 females, there were 115.6 males. For every 100 females age 18 and over, there were 111.0 males.

The median income for a household in the village was $50,714, and the median income for a family was $63,125. Males had a median income of $47,500 versus $25,625 for females. The per capita income for the village was $24,646. About 10.1% of families and 15.0% of the population were below the poverty line, including 30.4% of those under age 18 and 2.5% of those age 65 or over.

== Notable people ==
Notable people associated with the village include:

- Irene L. Beland, nursing educator
- Robert D. Foster, physician and early member of the Latter Day Saint movement
- Hugh Doak Rankin, artist
