= Lake Taylorville =

- Location within Illinois Location within the United States
- Location: Christian County, Illinois
- Coordinates: 39.50°N 89.25°W
- Type: reservoir
- Primary inflows: Sangamon River
- Primary outflows: Sangamon River
- Basin countries: United States
- Max. length: 6.5 m (21 ft)
- Max. width: 0.4 m (1 ft 4 in)
- Surface area: 1,200 acres (490 ha)

Lake Taylorville is a 1,200-acre (4.8 km²) reservoir located in Christian County, Illinois. Created in 1962 by damming the South Fork of Illinois's Sangamon River, it was built for water supply and recreation purposes. The lake is 6.5 miles (10.5 km) long and 0.4 miles (0.6 km) wide. The nearest town is Taylorville, Illinois, southeast of Springfield, Illinois.

The average water depth of Lake Taylorville is just under 7 feet, which is quite shallow in comparison to typical lakes of its size. Thus, it is important that extreme care be taken by watercraft, especially recreational boaters, to avoid accidents and injuries resulting from accidental impacts with objects submerged just below the surface. The relatively shallow average depth is a consequence of extreme siltation that has occurred due to the large watershed of Lake Taylorville.

Lake Taylorville is managed by the city of Taylorville.

As with other Central Illinois reservoirs, Lake Taylorville is troubled by siltation, with an estimated 90,000 tons of silt annually eroding from farms in the lake's South Fork of the Sangamon catchment area and washing into the lake. The city in 1998 built a low-headed silt dam on Locust Creek, one of the reservoir's tributaries, to reduce lake siltation.
