= Rock Cut State Park =

State park in Illinois, USA

- IUCN category III (natural monument or feature)
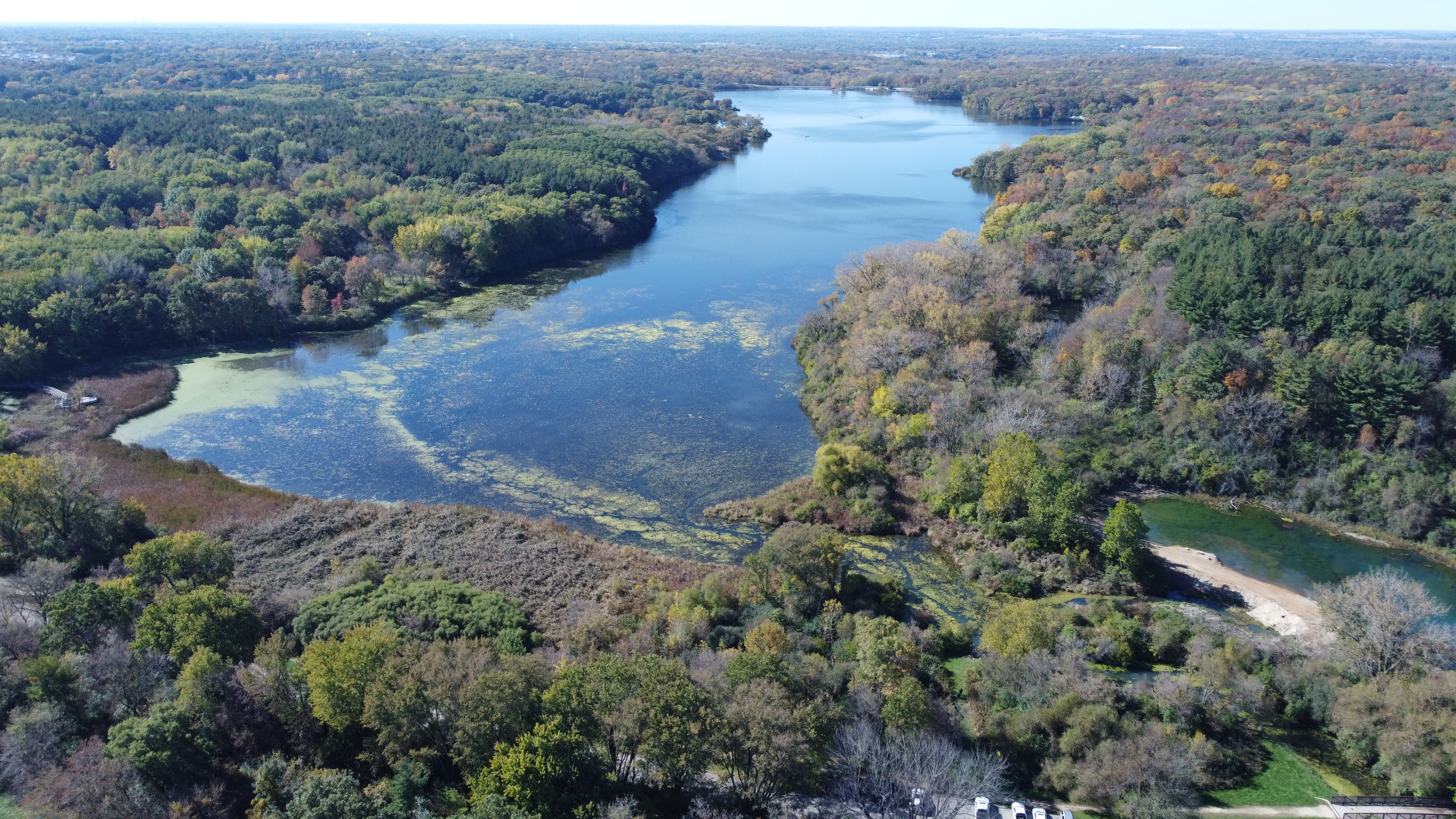
- Pierce Lake at Rock Cut State Park
- Interactive map of Rock Cut State Park
- Location: Winnebago County, Illinois, USA
- Nearest city: Loves Park, Illinois
- Coordinates: 42°21′06″N 88°58′35″W
- Area: 3,254 acres (13.17 km^{2})
- Governing body: Illinois Department of Natural Resources

Rock Cut State Park is a state park of the U.S. state of Illinois. Located in Loves Park in Winnebago County, it covers 3,254 acres (1,317 ha), enveloping Pierce Lake and Olson Lake. Rock Cut Park's main entrance is located on Highway 173, 1 mile west of Interstate 90.

== History ==
During the 17th century, Native Americans who were driven from the East by the Iroquois Confederacy settled in today's Northern Illinois. These Natives were originally in the region south of Lake Michigan and spoke Miami. The land in which they settled became Rock Cut State Park. The region was occupied by the Mascouten between the mid-17th century to the early to mid-18th century. After the Mascouten lost influence on the land, it was taken up by the Winnebago.

It is after this tribe that the county in Illinois where the park is located is named. This land became the property of the United States as a result of Indian concessions after the Black Hawk War. Once under American control, the Scots settled around Argyle, which led to the Scottish settlement in Northern Illinois, along with some westward-bound New Yorkers and New Englanders. The New Yorkers and New Englanders that made a settlement in this region now known as Rock Cut established a town named Harlem, after New York's own Harlem. The land acquisition proposition was made by Representative Pierce of Rockford, Illinois, near the park, after whom the most popular fishing spot in the park known as Pierce Lake. The proposition was made in 1955 and the park was officially in existence two years later in 1957 on October 25.

== Layout ==
There are 268 campsites for overnight stays at the park. The reservations spread from class A, B, and C. The spaces open for camping are open year-round with many different accommodations for different seasons. For instance, during the winter, electricity is provided to those who wish to have it available to them. There are equestrian trails for those with horses, but the campground does not rent out horses. There is a 40-mile (64 km) network of trails for visitors to hike and run on. Twenty-three miles are designated mountain biking trails and fourteen miles of trails are devoted to horseback riding. Pierce Lake covers 147 acres (59 ha) with an average depth of 11.19 feet (3.41 m) and a shoreline 4.2 miles (6.8 km) long.

== Plant and animal life ==
Due to the plentiful supply of water and moisture throughout the park, wildlife and plants grow abundantly. Rock Cut State Park has one of the largest and few remaining grassland and wildflower prairies left. Waterfowl, hawks, and other birds can be frequently spotted. Mammals that thrive in this region and are regularly spotted include deer, fox, muskrat, beavers, opossum, raccoons, squirrels, and woodchucks. More than 100 sorts of flowers grow in the park. The trees are thick and all over the land within the park's confines. The water is replenished and stocked with largemouth bass, redear sunfish, bluegill, channel catfish, bullhead, muskellunge, northern pike, and walleye.

== Climate ==
The temperate continental climate of Rock Cut is typical for the region of the Midwest in which it is found. The summers can reach sweltering temperatures in the 90s Fahrenheit and the winters get as low as subzero levels in bitter wind. The fall and spring progressively grow to be more and more like the season they approach over time.

== Recreation ==
The park offers a wide variety of activities for people of all ages and interests. Along the water there is sand volleyball, lifeguarding lessons, boat rentals, kayaking, canoeing, and fishing. More land based recreation involves hunting, hiking, running, biking, horseback riding, picnicking, and camping. In the winter, cross country skiing is available. There is much to be seen and done at this sprawling park.

== Gallery ==
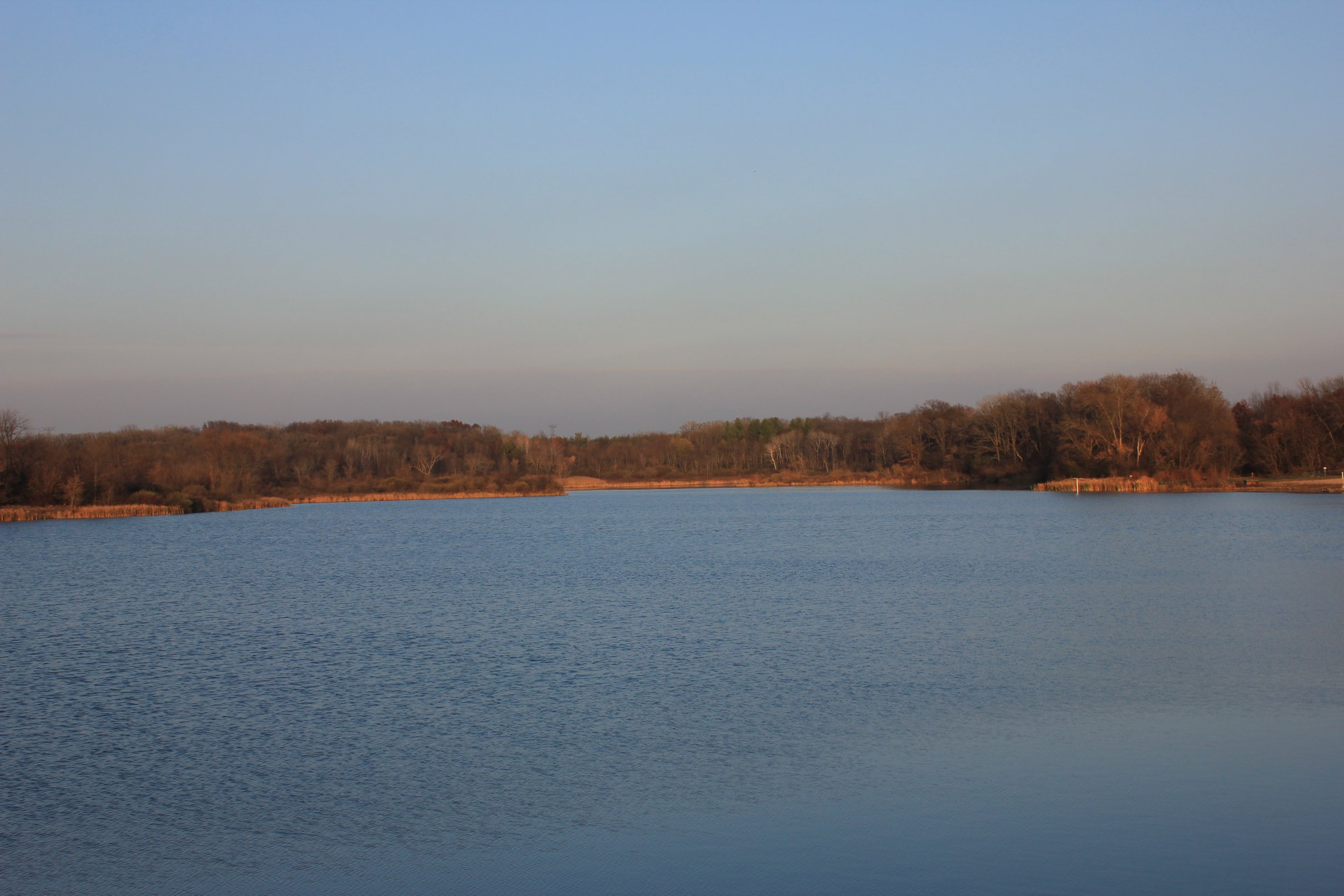
Long View of Lake Olson near sunset

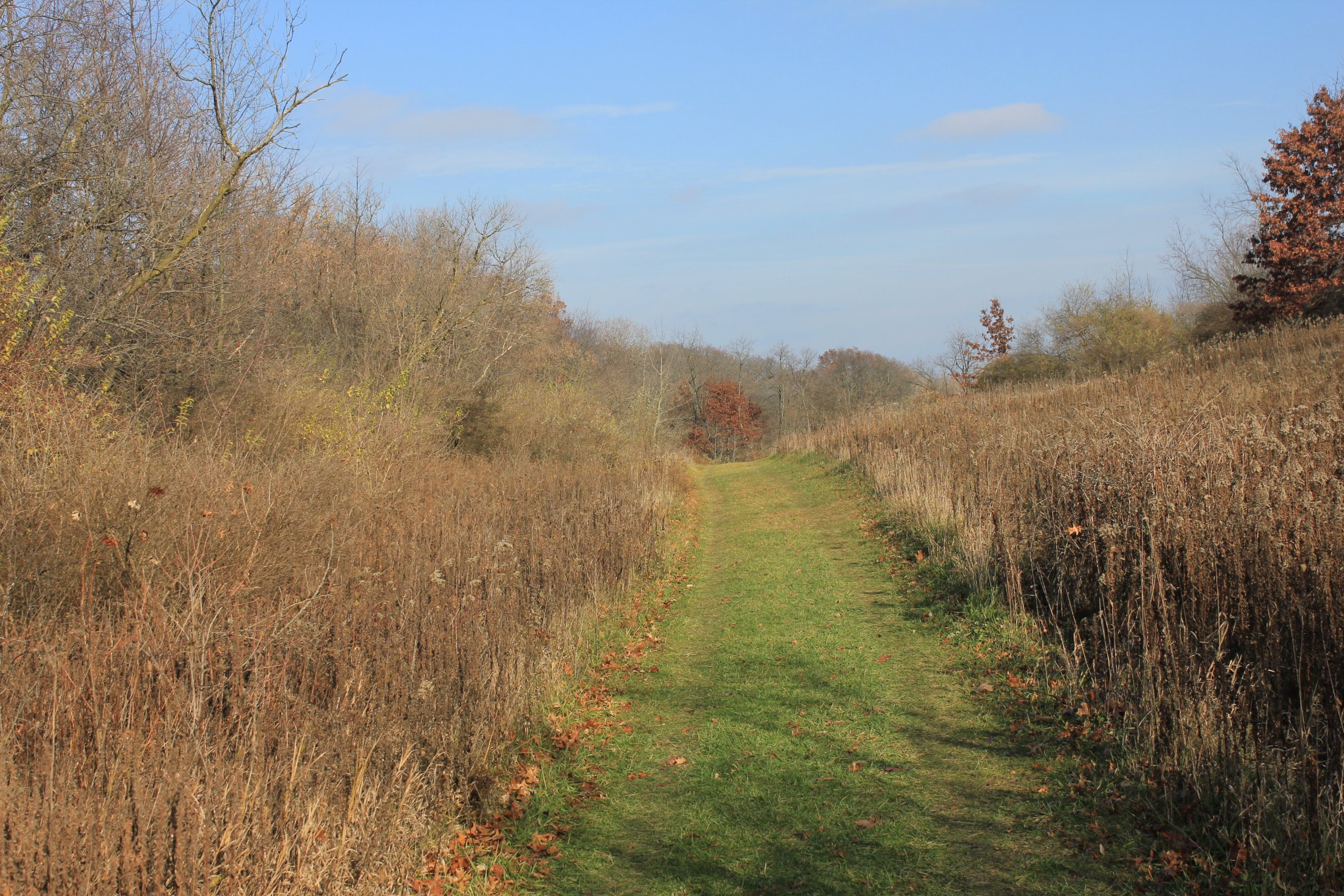
One of the many hiking trails at Rock Cut State Park

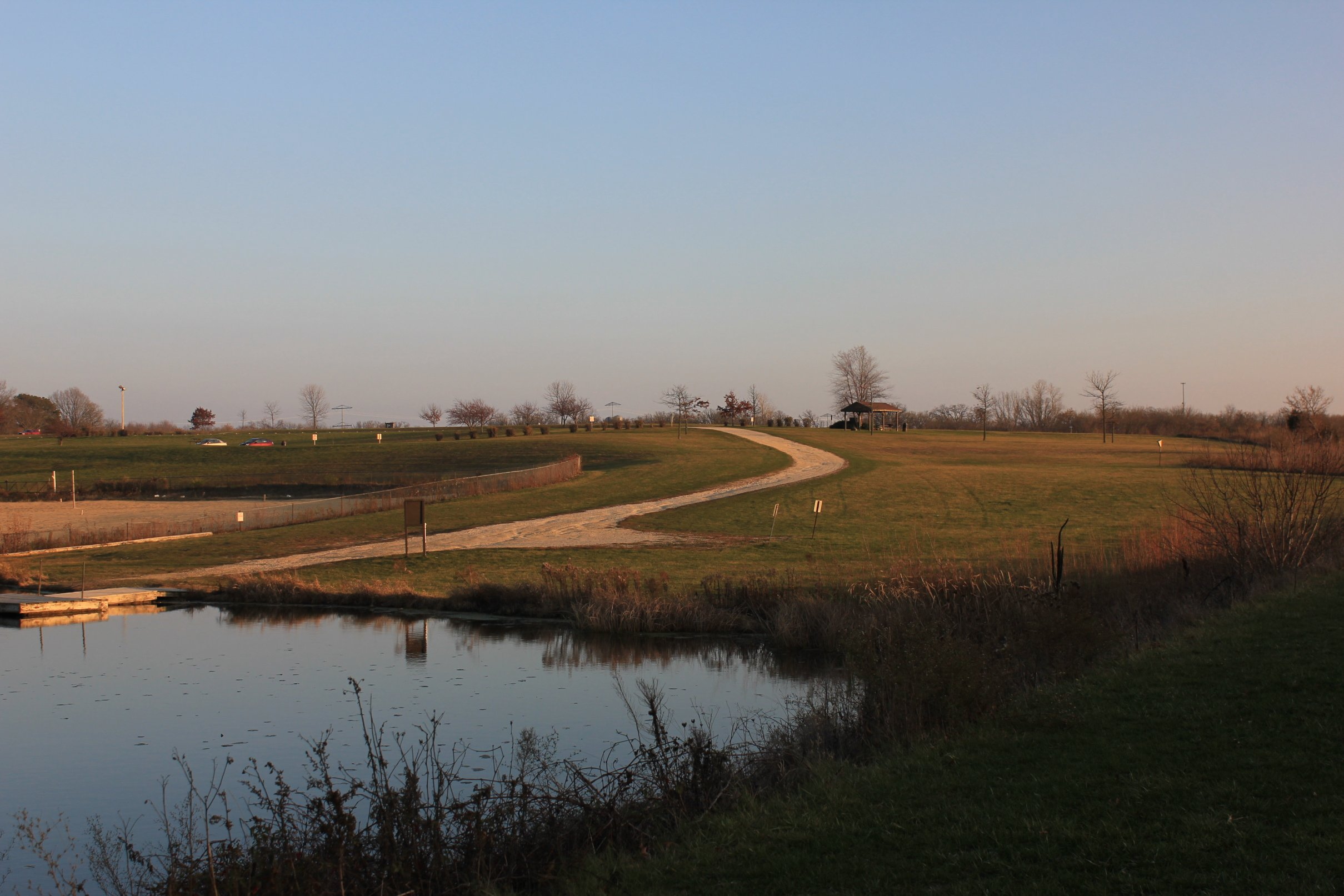
Lake Olson Beach and parking lot area
