= Vandalia Lake =

- Interactive map of Vandalia Lake
- Coordinates: 39°00′48″N 89°08′29″W
- Type: Reservoir

Vandalia Lake is a reservoir in Fayette County, Illinois. Served by Illinois Route 185 and by rural roads, it is 5 miles (8.0 km) northwest of the small Illinois city of Vandalia. The city, which owns the lake for flood control and water-supply purposes, reports that it is 660 acres in size and has a shoreline of 12 miles in length. The lake has a marina, boat dock, campground, and beach. Lake fishing specializes in stocked bass, including largemouth bass. The lake also offers channel catfish and bluegill. Much of the shore of the lake has been developed as real estate.

Water from Vandalia Lake is released into Bear Creek, a tributary of the Kaskaskia River. The lake is located in Shafter Township and Sharon Township, with a tiny fragment of the lake extending into Bear Grove Township. At the time of Abraham Lincoln's service as a pioneer state legislator in the nearby Vandalia State House State Historic Site, a local population of black bears inspired the name of the creek and prairie grove. The bears have since disappeared.
