= Countryside Lake =

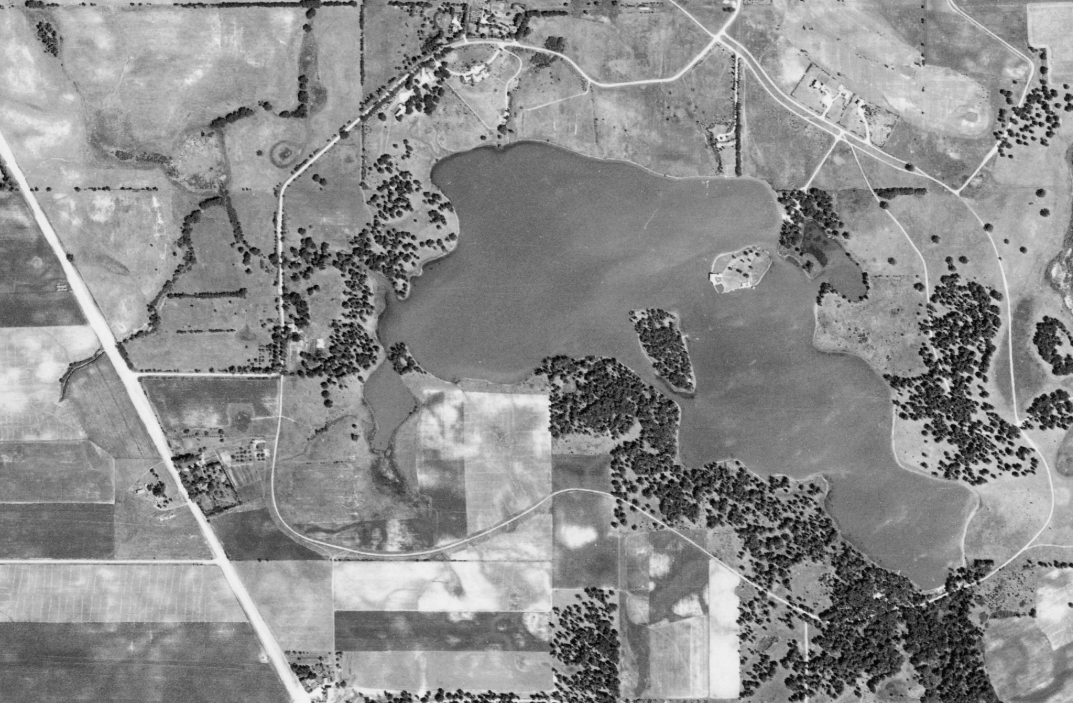
- The lake in 1939, thirteen years after the dam was built

- Location within Illinois Location within the United States
- Location: Lake County, Illinois
- Coordinates: 42°14′48″N 88°01′48″W
- Type: Reservoir
- Built: 1926
- Surface area: 141 acres (57 ha)
- Max. depth: 10 ft (3.0 m)
- Surface elevation: 781 ft (238 m)
- Website: countrysidelake.org

Countryside Lake is a manmade lake located in Lake County Illinois. The private lake is in the center of the Countryside neighborhood and is designated for use by the CLA (Countryside Lake Association) and their guests. Countryside Lake was created in 1926 by putting a dam at the end of a boggy stream. After the dam was created dredging equipment was brought to clear the surrounding area to expand the stream into a lake. The lake is relatively shallow, at a maximum depth of 10 feet (3.0 m) and the lake is mostly recreational including boating, swimming, and fishing. The lake is around 141 acres (57 ha). Boats with 15 horsepower or less are allowed on the lake, in order to keep the shoreline from deteriorating. Countryside Lake has one beach that has a lifeguard on Fridays through Sundays during the summer months. At the beach there is a playground and numerous docks for boats.

== History ==
Countryside Lake was created by Samuel Insull in 1926. Since there was only a boggy stream when he started to make the lake, it was a difficult task. He began by damming the southeast end of the stream. Once the dam was built, the stream was transformed into a lake using dredging equipment to create the intended outline of the lake. Once Insull finished the lake, he built a hunting lodge on the lake that still stands today.

The stock market crash of 1929 and the Great Depression brought Insull’s broader business empire to an abrupt end, slowing development in the area. For decades, Countryside Lake remained a relatively quiet and lightly populated community, with large tracts of land gradually changing ownership and being subdivided over time.

During the mid-20th century, the area retained much of its rural character. Residents enjoyed open land, wildlife, and a slower pace of life, even as suburban development gradually expanded outward from Chicago. In 1969 total CLA membership remained relatively small at about 65 members. Through the 1970s additional homes were built, and by 1979 CLA membership grew to more than 90 members. During the 1980s residential development in Lake County and Fremont Township increased substantially. Membership in Countryside Lake Association also began to grow at a faster pace.

== Neighborhood ==
Today, the neighborhood contains approximately 370 homes that are part of several homeowner associations. All members belong to Countryside Lake Association. Members may also belong to Countryside Homeowner Association, Countryside Oaks, Camden Trace, or Steeple Chase.

== Wildlife ==
Countryside Lake is home to abundant wildlife including many fish and has numerous birds that migrate through. Some of the fish that are in the lake are crappie, muskellunge, northern pike, walleye, largemouth bass, perch, bluegill, grass carp, sunfish, and catfish.
