= Mud Lake (Illinois) =

There are several lakes named Mud Lake within the U.S. state of Illinois.

- Mud Lake, Barrington Hills, Cook County, Illinois. 42°09′06″N 88°12′55″W
- Mud Lake (historic), Chicago, Cook County, Illinois. Was part of the Chicago Portage. No longer exists.
- Mud Lake, Gallatin County, Illinois. 37°35′54″N 88°09′50″W
- Mud Lake, Lake County, Illinois. 42°26′20″N 88°11′11″W
- Mud Lake, Mason County, Illinois. 40°24′15″N 89°57′06″W
- Mud Lake, Sangamon County, Illinois. 39°50′56″N 89°33′46″W
