= Little Swan Lake =

- Location within Illinois Location within the United States
- Location: Warren County, Illinois, United States
- Coordinates: 40°40′00″N 90°32′21″W
- Type: Artificial lake
- Basin countries: United States
- Surface area: 250 acres (100 ha)
- Surface elevation: 656 ft (200 m)

Little Swan Lake is an artificial lake in southeastern Warren County in the U.S. state of Illinois, due west of the village of Avon. The lake is impounded by Little Swan Lake Dam, completed in 1967.
