= Lake Killarney (Illinois) =

- Location within Illinois
- Location: McHenry County, Illinois
- Coordinates: 42°14′22″N 88°15′29″W
- Type: Glacial lake
- Basin countries: United States
- Surface area: 80 acres (320,000 m^{2})
- Average depth: 9.8 ft (3 m)
- Max. depth: 39 ft (12 m)
- Water volume: 15,000,000 ft^{3} (426,000 m^{3})
- Surface elevation: 814 ft (248 m)
- Settlements: Cary, Illinois

Lake Killarney is a subdivision surrounding a private lake located to the west of the Fox River in unincorporated Cary and Crystal Lake, Illinois. It is located 45 miles (72 km) northwest of Chicago. Lake Killarney residents have exclusive lake rights to an 80-acre (320,000 m^{2}) spring fed lake.

The Lake Killarney Home Owners Association was incorporated March 15, 1962, and is the sole owner of the "Common Properties" known as Lake Killarney (the lake itself), its two beaches, parkland areas, along with various sections of property surrounding the lake.

== Lake Killarney Lake ==
Lake Killarney 42°14′22″N 88°15′29″W is an 80-acre (320,000 m^{2}) glacial lake located in McHenry County, northwest of Cary. The lake has a maximum depth of 40 feet (12 m), an average of 10 feet (3.0 m), and a storage capacity of 345 acre-feet (426,000 m^{3}). Lake Killarney serves as a recreational lake for its residences. Residents practice catch and release to assure the fish stay plentiful. A valid Illinois Fishing license is required. Swimming, fishing, row-boating or canoeing, and sail-boating are the major uses of the lake. Access is limited to subdivision members only. No motors of any kind are allowed on the lake.

== See also ==
- List of lakes in Illinois
