= Lake Galena (Illinois) =

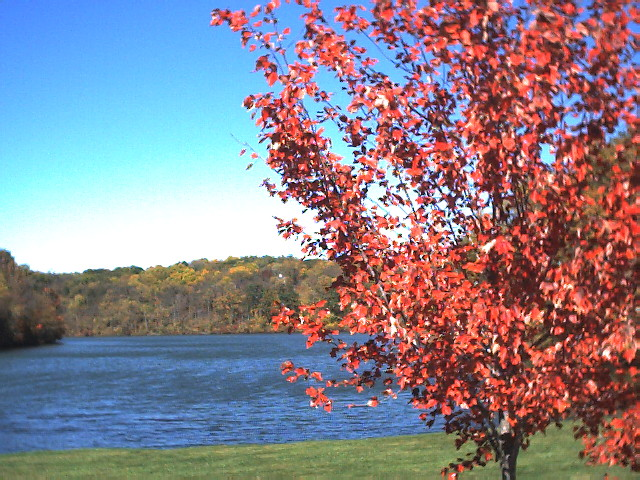

- Location within Illinois Location within the United States
- Location: Jo Daviess County, Illinois, U.S.
- Coordinates: 42°24′26″N 90°20′30″W
- Type: reservoir
- Primary inflows: Smallpox Creek
- Primary outflows: Smallpox Creek
- Catchment area: 10,340 acres (41.8 km^{2})
- Basin countries: United States
- Surface area: 220 acres (89 ha)
- Shore length^{1}: 7 mi (11 km)
- Surface elevation: 715 ft (218 m)
- Settlements: Galena
- ^{1} Shore length is not a well-defined measure.

Lake Galena is a reservoir in Jo Daviess County, Illinois, located near Galena.

== History ==
The lake formed following the damming of Smallpox Creek in 1974. Smallpox Creek is one of many tributaries of the Mississippi River.

== Geography ==
Lake Galena receives its water from a watershed about 10,591 acres (42.86 km^{2}) in size and is located at an elevation of about 710 feet (220 m). It encompasses an area of 225 acres (91 hectares) and with 7 miles (11 km) of shoreline. It is located within a private development of Galena known as the Galena Territory.

== Use ==
The lake is mostly used for recreational purposes including boating and fishing. The lake is managed by a non-profit corporation, The Galena Territory Association, who manages a marina located on the east end of the lake. The eighth hole on the Eagle Ridge Resort & Spa's North golf course crosses a small inlet of the lake.

== See also ==
- Galena River
- List of lakes in Illinois

== Bibliography ==
=== Further reading ===
- Shirk, M. (1995). Super Family Vacations, 3rd Edition: Resort and Adventure Guide. New York: HarperResource.
