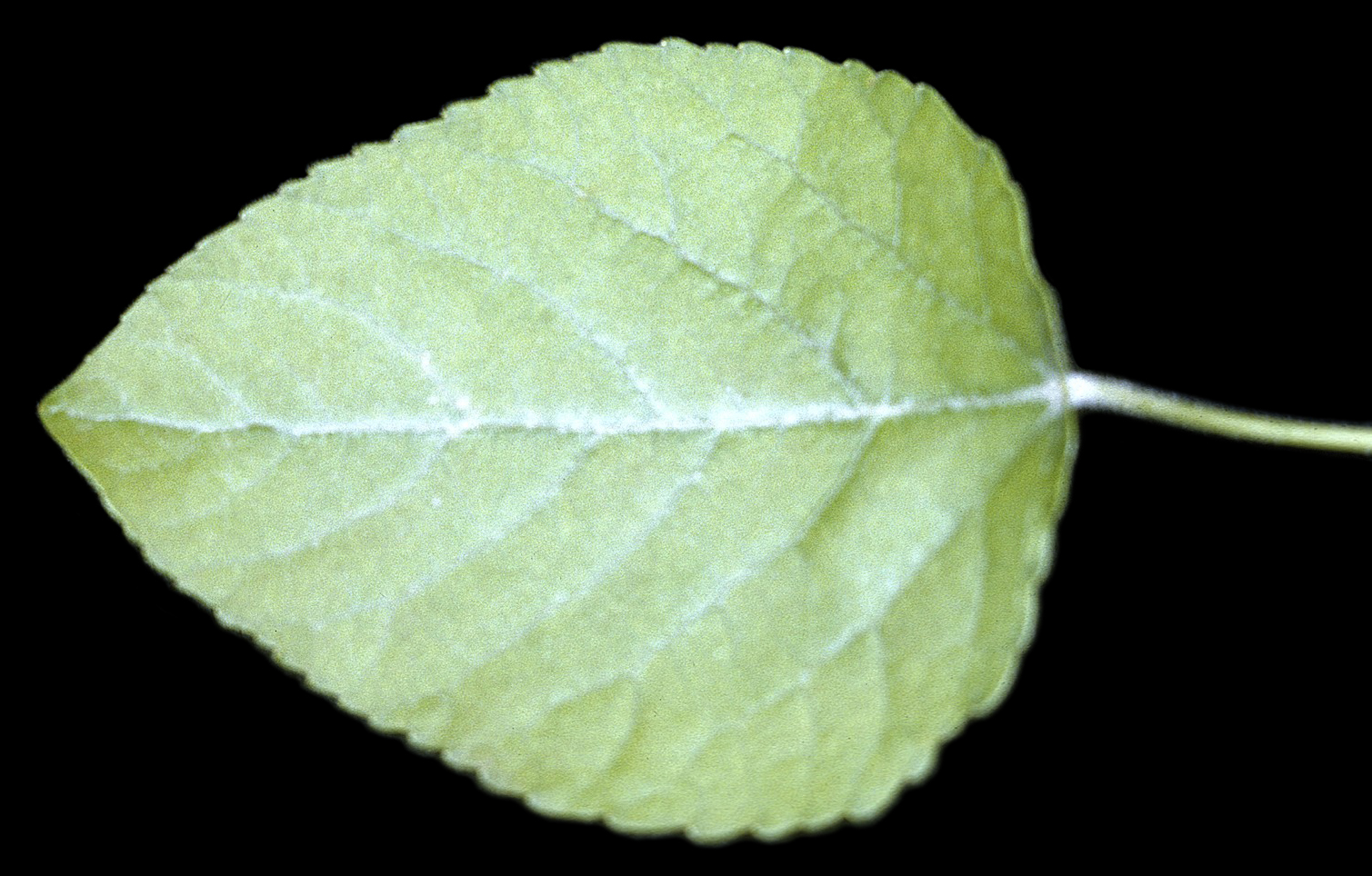

Conservation status
- Least Concern (IUCN 3.1)

Scientific classification
- Kingdom: Plantae
- Clade: Tracheophytes
- Clade: Angiosperms
- Clade: Eudicots
- Clade: Rosids
- Order: Malpighiales
- Family: Salicaceae
- Genus: Populus
- Section: Populus sect. Leucoides
- Species: P. heterophylla

Binomial name
- Populus heterophylla L.
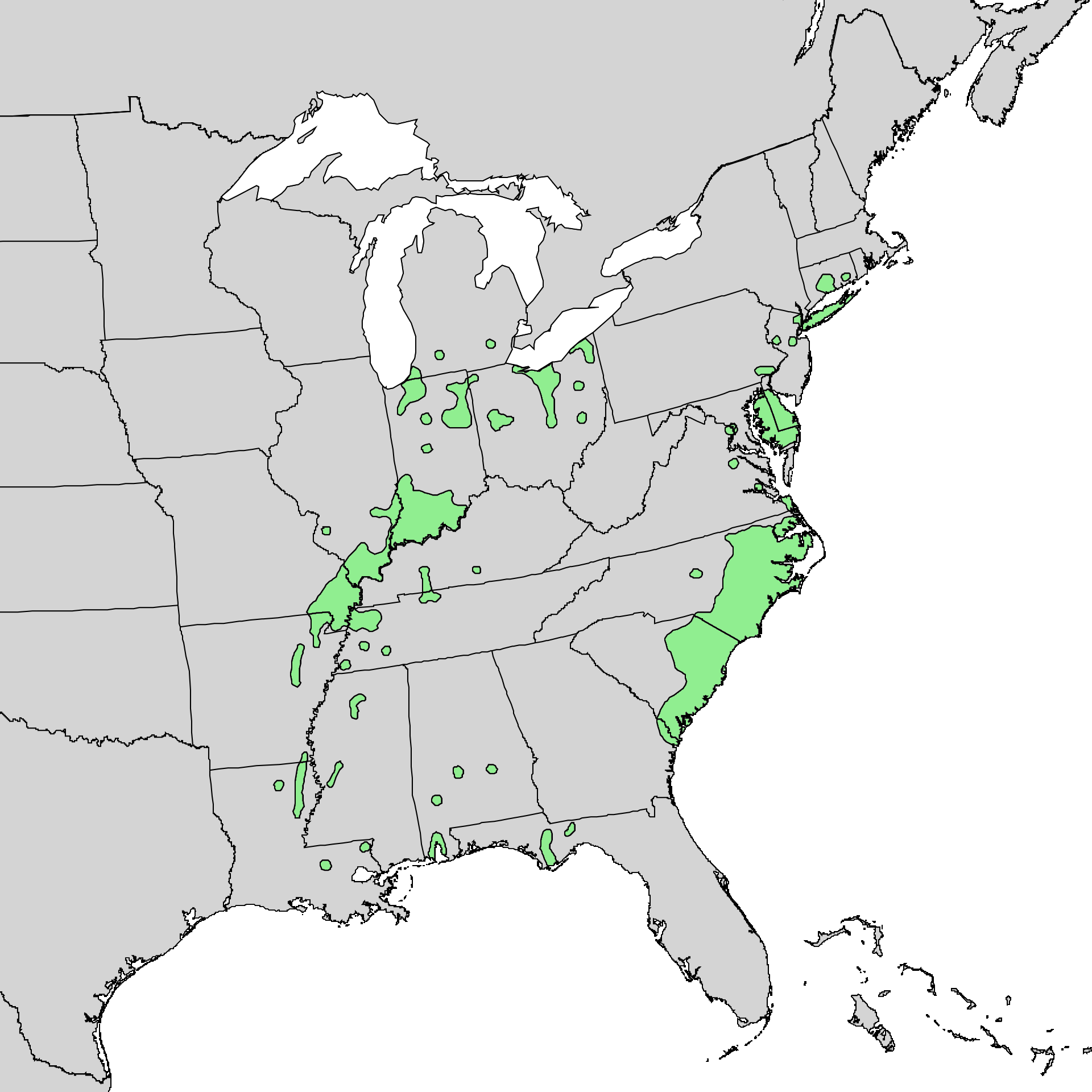

= Populus heterophylla =

Species of tree

Populus heterophylla, also known as downy poplar, swamp poplar and swamp cottonwood, is a large deciduous poplar belonging to the Populus genus of the family Salicaceae. This species can grow on sites that have too much water for other native poplars. On the IUCN Red List this species is listed as "least concern".

== Description ==
Swamp poplar can reach a height 50 to 100 ft (15 to 30 m) at maturity. The trunk and branches are a light to medium grey, with the trunk being coarsely furrowed. The leaves are alternate deciduous that are 4 to 6 inches (10 to 15 cm) long and 3 to 4 inches (7.6 to 10.2 cm) across. Mature leaves are medium to dark green on their upper surface and pale green on the lower surface. Petioles are 2 to 3 inches (5.1 to 7.6 cm) long and tend to be between pale green and pale yellow. This species is pollinated by wind. This species flowers in April and fruits May-June.

== Habitat ==
=== Location ===
This species is indigenous to warm, temperate regions in North America, although nowhere is it considered abundant. It is found in wet bottomland forests. Swamp cottonwood can be found along the east coast of the United States from Connecticut to Georgia, as well as northwestern Florida and west to Louisiana. It also grows in the Mississippi valley, Ohio and southern Michigan.

=== Soils and topography ===
Populus heterophylla is typically found on heavy clays, but can be found on the edges of swamps (not within). Ideal growth will happen in areas where the water table is near the surface for all but two to three months a year.

== Climate ==
Humid climate is common throughout the range of the swamp poplar. Rainfall varies for this species based on how far north it is found. When found in Indiana, the average annual rainfall is about 35 in (890 cm); as opposed to when found in Louisiana average annual rainfall is 59 in (1500 mm). Yearly average temperatures range in the North and South from 50°F to 70°F respectively.

== Special uses ==
There are no special uses or commercial value for this species due to the similarity to Populus deltoides, which grows faster and easier.
