= Bayles Lake (Illinois) =

- Location within Illinois Location within the United States
- Location: Iroquois County, near Loda, Illinois
- Coordinates: 40.5291°N 88.0932°W
- Type: reservoir
- Primary inflows: none: spring fed
- Primary outflows: none: spring fed
- Basin countries: United States
- Max. length: 9.93 mi (15.98 km)
- Max. width: 0.7 mi (1.1 km)
- Surface area: 237 acres (96 ha)
- Average depth: 8–16 ft (2.4–4.9 m)
- Max. depth: 22 ft (6.7 m)
- Shore length^{1}: 9.94 mi (16.00 km)
- Surface elevation: 748 ft (228 m)
- Islands: none
- Settlements: Loda, Illinois
- Website: bayleslakehoa.com
- ^{1} Shore length is not a well-defined measure.

Bayles Lake is a freshwater reservoir located in west Loda, Illinois in Iroquois County, 13.6 miles from Onarga and separated by a road from Lake Iroquois, Illinois.

== Fishing ==
Known for the high ranked fishing, Bayles Lake is one of the best ranked fishing locations in North America holding five state record fish (walleye, green sunfish, brown bullhead, white crappie, and hybrid sunfish). The lake's most popular fish are the following species:

Species name	Lake avg. weight	Lake avg. length	Lake record
Walleye	4-8 pounds	18-26 inches	15.9 pounds- 32 inches: also was the Illinois fishing record
Largemouth bass	3-5 pounds	17-23 inches	10.3 pounds- 27 inches
Smallmouth bass	2-4 pounds	15-20 inches	5.1 pounds- 23 inches
Channel catfish	10-20 pounds	25-40 inches	24 pounds- 34 inches
Striped bass	8-15 pounds	30-40 inches	15.7 pounds- 37 inches
Black crappie	0.5-1.5 pounds	6-12 inches	1.6 pounds- 14.4 inches
White crappie	0.5-1.5 pounds	6-12 inches	4.7 pounds- 14.1 inches also was the Illinois fishing record
Bluegill	0.5-1.0 pounds	5-10 inches	0.8 pounds- 11 inches
Carp	9-19 pounds	23-35 inches	23.95 pounds- 34 inches: this record is not official
Flathead catfish	10-35 pounds	25-50 inches	34 pounds- 54 inches
Blue catfish	15-45 pounds	25-55 inches	37 pounds- 51 inches
Green sunfish	0.2-1.5 pounds	4-11 inches	2.1 pounds- 12 inches also was the Illinois fishing Record
Brown bullhead	1-2 pounds	6-14 inches	2.7 pounds- 16 inches also was the Illinois fishing record
Yellow bass	0.1-0.7 pounds	4-12 inches	1.1 pounds- 13 inches
Rock bass	0.1-1.1 pounds	6-14 inches	1.7 pounds- 15 inches

Bayles Lake is annually stocked with fish species other than the ones listed above. Fishermen will find a variety of fish including channel catfish, blue catfish, sunfish, largemouth bass, walleye, smallmouth bass, white catfish, striped bass, flathead catfish, crappie, bluegill, yellow bass, white bass, rock bass, panfish, and white perch here. Fishing came to be one of the top attractions at Bayles Lake due to the high density of fish. Though the lake does not contain sea weed, fish happen to thrive in the waters and grow to tremendous sizes. Fisherman find it convenient not to deal with as many snags and weeds getting caught on their lures.

== History ==
Bayles Lake is a man-made reservoir constructed in the late 1940s fed by a natural spring. On November 17, 1952, at a special meeting, the board of directors of the corporation known as the Bayles Lake, Inc., made and executed the Bayles Lake Covenants. In 1969, Bayles Lake Inc. assigned all the rights reserved to it over to the Bayles Lake Lot Owners Association, a not-for-profit corporation. This assignment, including the rights under the Covenants, was filed in the Iroquois County recorder's office in Watseka, Illinois. The association, therefore, owns all the lakes, roads, parks, all lands not specifically dedicated, and the water and sewer systems. In 2008 the Bayles Lake Lot Owners Association became the Bayles Lake Homeowners Association (BLHOA) and in 2009 a website was created www.bayleslakehoa.com
