= Canton Lake (Illinois) =

Reservoir in Fulton County, Illinois, US

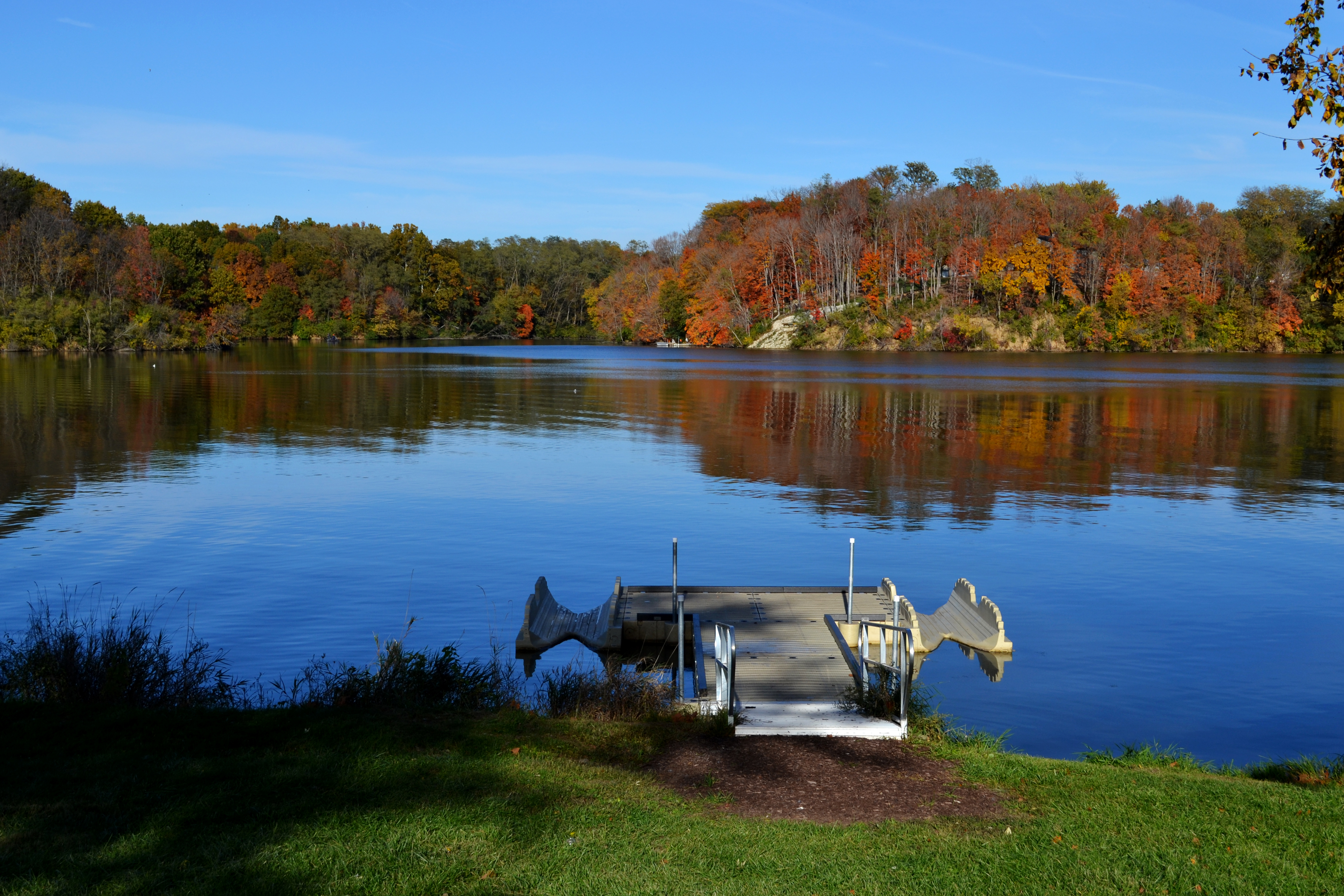
- View from North Boat Dock Road

- Location within Illinois Location within the United States
- Location: Fulton County
- Coordinates: 40°33′48″N 89°58′23″W
- Type: reservoir
- Basin countries: United States
- Surface area: 251 acres (102 ha)
- Average depth: 15–20 ft (4.6–6.1 m)
- Max. depth: 35 ft (11 m)
- Shore length^{1}: 13 mi (21 km)
- Surface elevation: 571 ft (174 m)
- Islands: none
- Settlements: Canton, Illinois
- Website: www.fultoncountytourism.org/smiths.htm
- ^{1} Shore length is not a well-defined measure.

Canton Lake is a freshwater reservoir located in Fulton County, Illinois. It is located east of Canton on Illinois Route 27.

== Natural features ==
Canton Lake is a 250 acres (100 ha) lake constructed in 1939. The lake has a maximum depth of 35 feet and an average depth of 14 feet. The reservoir holds approximately 3,500 acre feet of water with 7.1 – 13 miles of shoreline. It has no rooted aquatic vegetation.

It was the primary potable water source for Canton since April 1940. In 2012, the city switched to aquifer water due to the need for less chemical treatment.

According to a report by the Illinois Environmental Protection Agency, "Canton Lake is impaired with respect to aesthetic quality, fish consumption, and public water supply use." In 2015, a court case regarding a North Canton coal mine's permit was resolved; the Sierra Club claimed that this would help protect Canton Lake's quality.

In 2019, many upgrades were completed, such as three buildings demolished, the bathhouse renovated with paint and a new roof, and a repaved road.

== Fauna ==
Known for its trophy sized largemouth bass and its abundant channel catfish, the lake's major fish species are largemouth bass, crappie, bluegill, yellow bass, channel catfish, carp, and gizzard shad.

== Recreation ==
The City of Canton has various user fees for boat use and an 85 horse power motor limit. The lake had a large number of channel catfish, largemouth bass, and tiger muskie stocked over the last decade. Nine tournaments were held on the lake in 2022.

A seasonal campground with cabin rental and picnic areas are available. Hiking trails and a lake view observation deck are other features of the area. The Lake Canton Nature Trails are 1.92 mi (3.09 km) of wooded paths along the shoreline.
