= Lake Killarney (Bahamas) =

Lake in the Bahamas

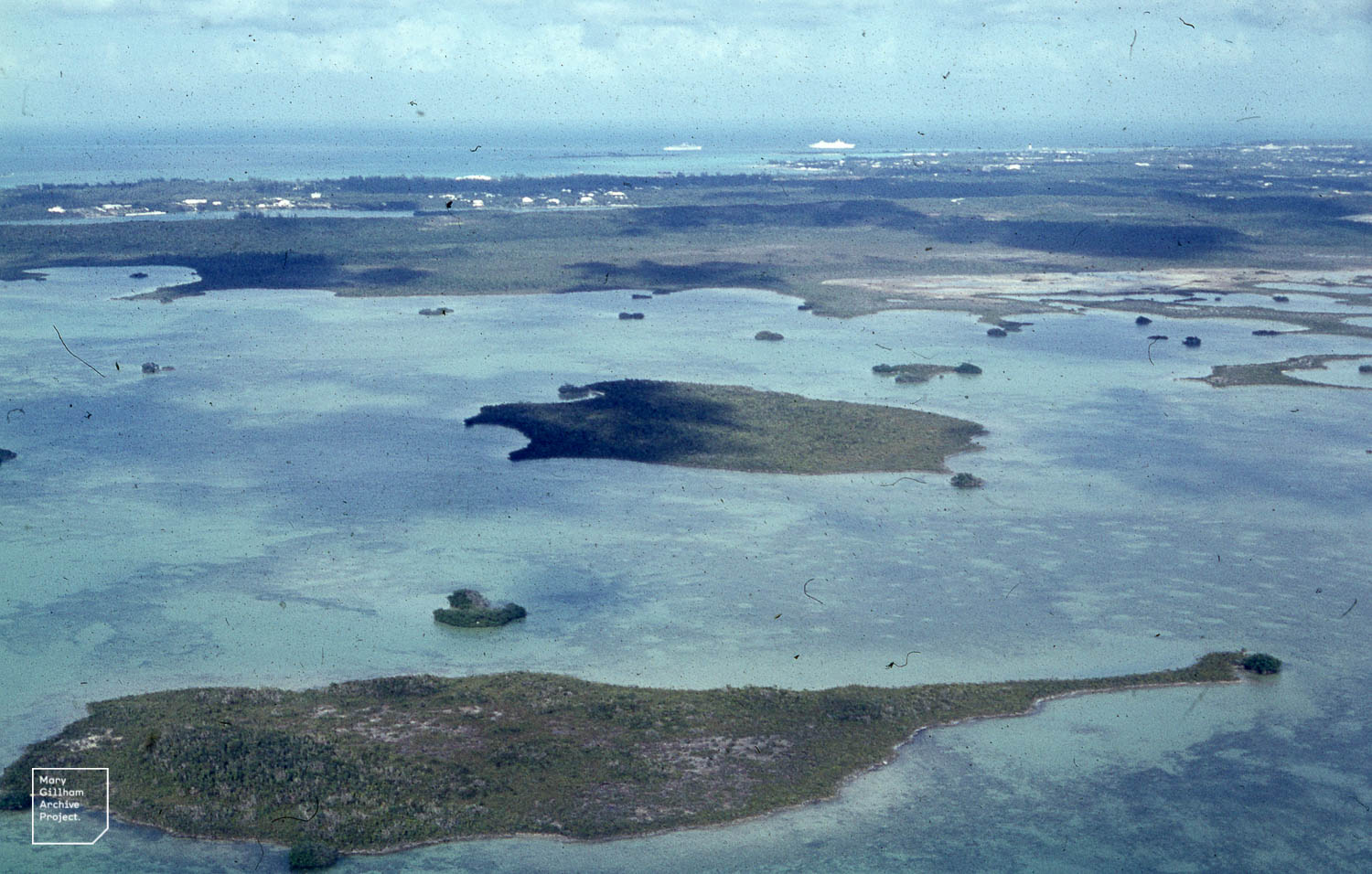
- Lake Killarney can be seen from the air

- Location within Bahamas
- Interactive map of Lake Killarney
- Location: New Providence
- Coordinates: 25°02′33″N 77°26′07″W
- Primary inflows: Canal from Lake Nancy
- Basin countries: Bahamas
- Max. depth: 3 m (9.8 ft)

Lake Killarney, also known as Petty Lake, is a shallow lake on New Providence Island in the Bahamas, and the largest on the island. Considered hidden from view, it is located just east of Lynden Pindling International Airport. It connects to the smaller Lake Nancy to its north through a canal made for canoeing.

== Ecology ==
Lake Killarney is bounded by marshland and mangrove cays. Bird species such as coots and ducks rest amongst the mangroves.
