= Amplepuis–Saint-Vincent-de-Reins railway =

Former railway in France

Coordinates: 45.97091°N 4.32664°E

Amplepuis–Saint-Vincent-de-Reins
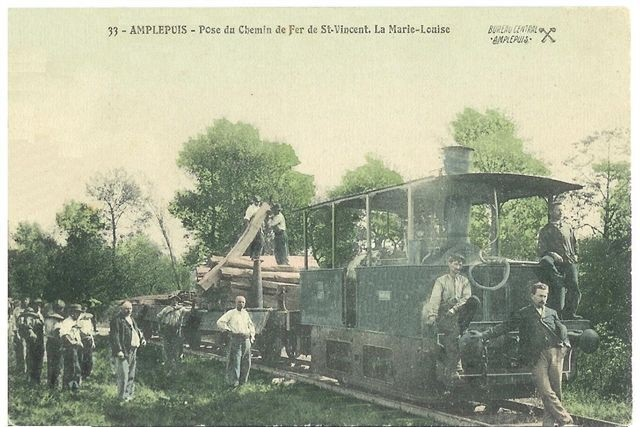
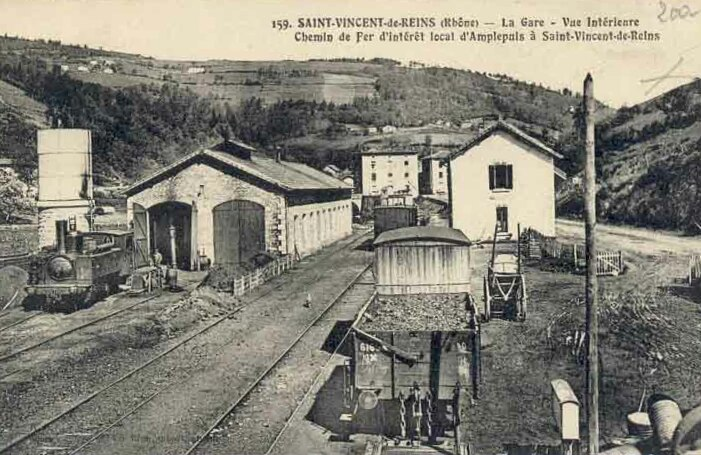
- Steam locomotive Maríe-Louise in Amplepuis Saint-Vincent-de-Reins

Technical
- Line length: 15 km (9.3 mi)
- Track gauge: 1,435 mm (4 ft 8 1/2 in)
Route map
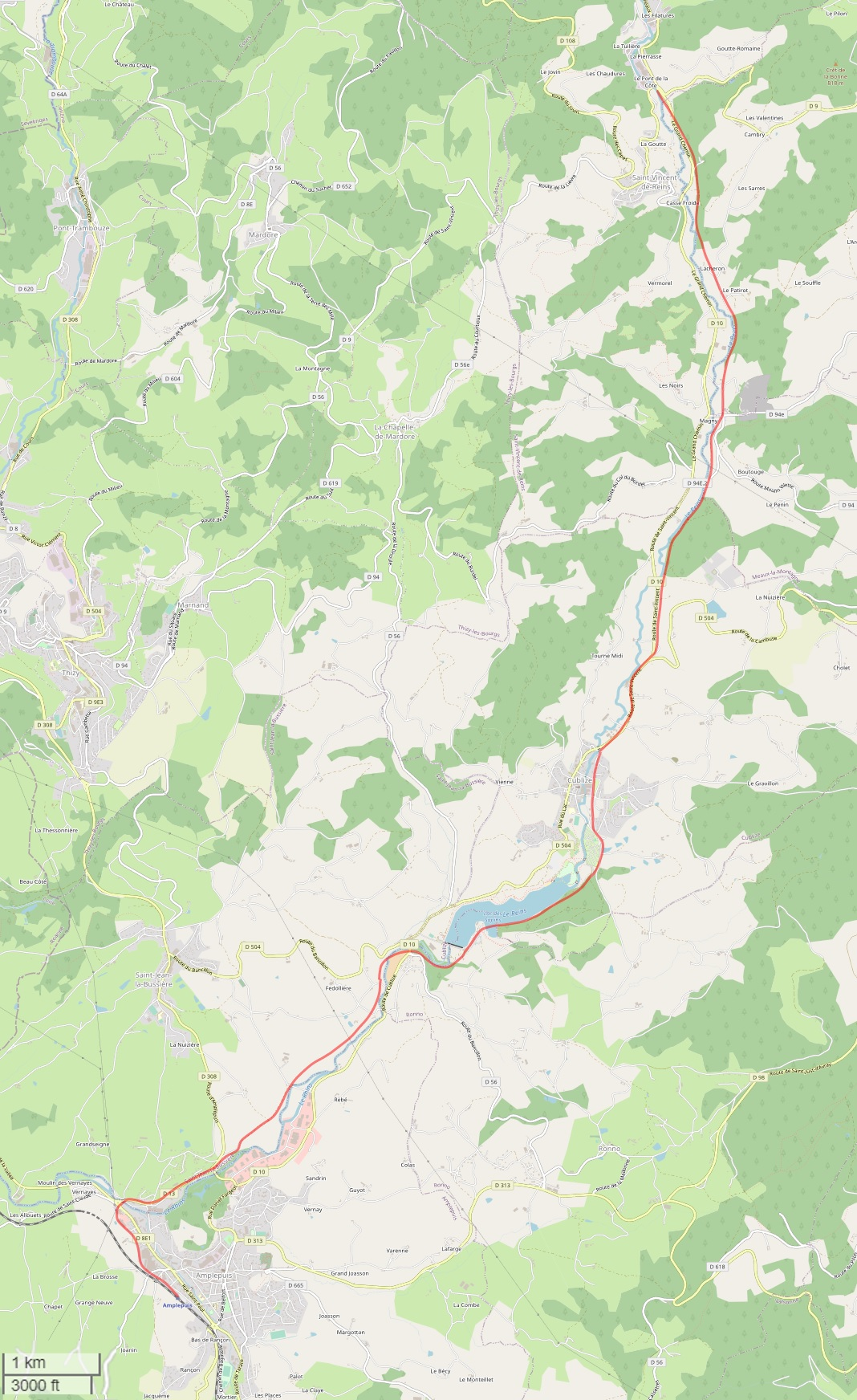

The Amplepuis–Saint-Vincent-de-Reins railway was a 15 kilometres (9.3 miles) standard gauge railway in the Rhône department in the Auvergne-Rhône-Alpes region of France, which was operated by the Compagnie du chemin de fer d’intérêt local d’Amplepuis à Saint-Vincent-de-Reins (ASV) from 1907 to 1928.

== History ==
From 1929, the line was operated by the Chemin de fer du Rhône (CFR) until it was closed in 1935. After the closure, the line was dismantled, and the locomotives, wagons and rails were sold to be exported for the construction of the railway network in Ethiopia.

The line was used for the transport of passengers and goods. The freight traffic consisted mainly of wood and coal, which were needed in the weaving mills and spinning mills, among others, which were increasingly powered by steam engines:

- Usines Gouttenoire et Cie (now Deveaux SA), Mechanical Cotton Weaving Mill, in the hamlet of Gouttenoire near Saint-Vincent-de-Reins
- Usine Rollin, mechanical weaving mill, St-Vincent-de-Reins
- Usine Suchel, in the hamlet of La Tuliere
- Usine Deveaux (Filature Hydraulique de P. Lacroix, L. Lacroix & Berger Successeurs), Saint-Vincent-de-Reins
- Usine textile au Lacheron

== Route ==
The 15 km (9.3 mi) long local railway line with a gauge of 1,435 mm (4 ft 8 1/2 in) ran from Amplepuis on PLM's Roanne–Lyon railway via Le Bancillon, Cublize and Meaux/Magny to Saint-Vincent-de-Reins. An extension through a tunnel to Belleroche had already been planned and marked out in 1914. However, World War I prevented the construction work necessary for the line extension.

== Stations and locomotives ==
Station	Photo	Remarks
Amplepuis		PLM connections to Lyon and Roanne
Le Bancillon		
Cublize		
Meaux/Magny		
Saint-Vincent-de-Reins		
Locomotive	Photo	Remarks
L’Esperance		
