= Spiral (railway) =

Railway layout for steep climbs

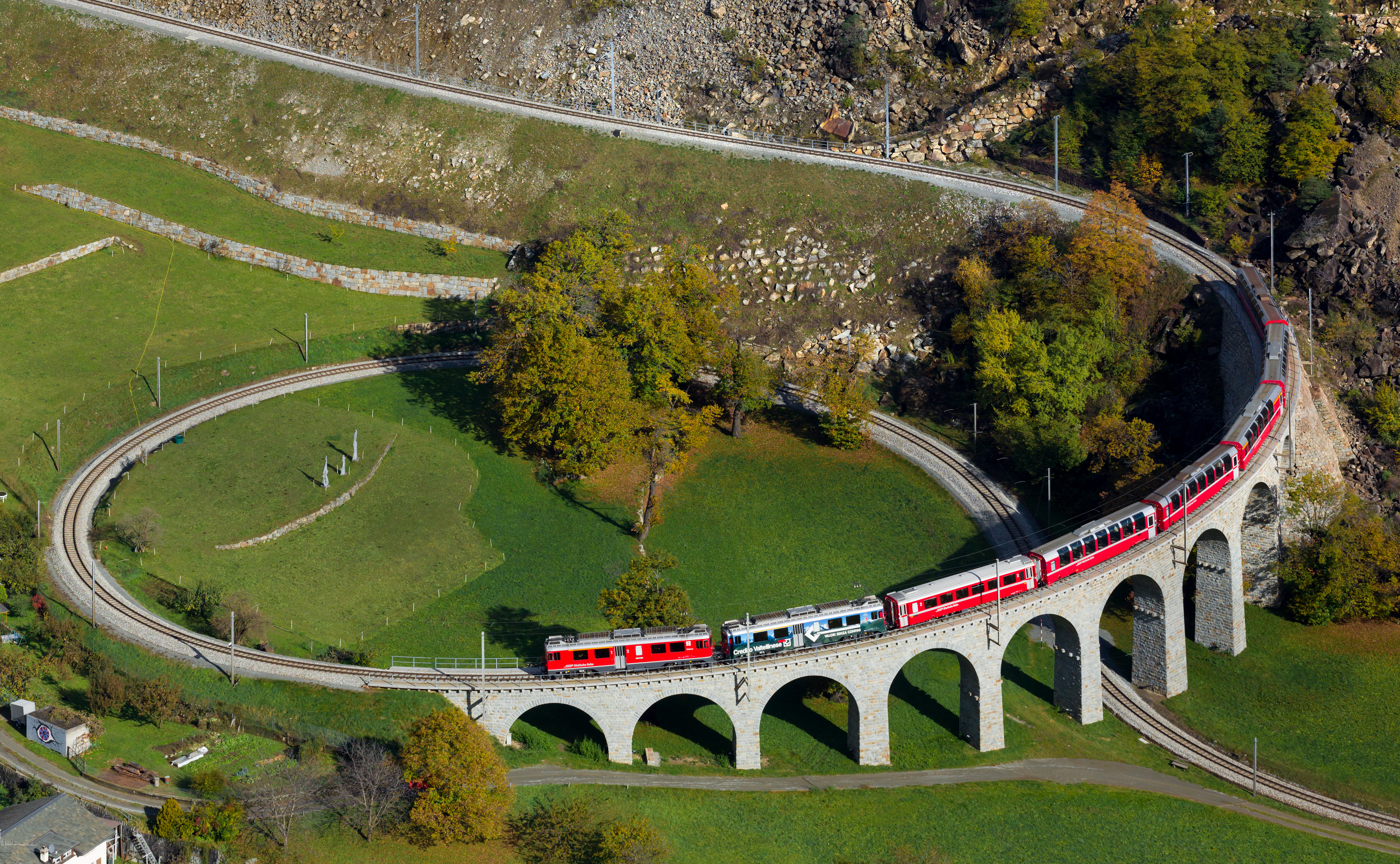
Spiral viaduct of the Bernina Express near Brusio, Switzerland.

A spiral (sometimes called a spiral loop or just loop) is a technique employed by railways to ascend steep hills.

A railway spiral rises on a steady curve until it has completed a loop, passing over itself as it gains height, allowing the railway to gain vertical elevation in a relatively short horizontal distance. It is an alternative to a zig-zag, and avoids the need for the trains to stop and reverse direction while ascending. If the train is longer than the length of each loop it may be possible to view it looping above itself.

The term "loop" is also often used for a railway that curves sharply and goes back on itself: if the railway crosses itself, then it forms a spiral or helix; otherwise, it forms the much more common horseshoe curve or bend.

== List of spirals ==
=== Argentina ===
- Two spirals between Tacuara and Meseta at 24°26′10″S 65°50′28″W and 24°23′17″S 65°51′01″W on the heritage Tren a las Nubes section of the Salta–Antofagasta railway part of the General Manuel Belgrano Railway.

=== Australia ===
- Spiral on the uphill track at Bethungra 34°45′16″S 147°52′13″E on the Main Southern railway line in New South Wales. The downhill track remains on the original steep plain 1 in 40 gradient.
- Spiral on the single track at Cougal 28°21′15″S 152°57′50″E on the North Coast railway line, New South Wales.

=== Bulgaria ===
- Four Spirals on the Rhodope Mountain Line between Septemvri to Dobrinishte railway between Velingrad and Cherna Mesta at 42°02′36″N 23°51′12″E, 42°02′27″N 23°50′30″E, 42°02′14″N 23°44′48″E and 42°02′53″N 23°44′10″E.
- Spiral just outside Klisura at 42°42′02″N 24°27′35″E on the Sofia to Tulovo railway.
- Spiral just outside Radevtsi at 42°47′46″N 25°32′38″E on the Ruse to Dimitrovgrad railway.
- Spiral and horseshoe bends just outside Raduntsi at 42°40′37″N 25°35′41″E on the Ruse to Dimitrovgrad railway.

=== Canada ===
- Double spiral at Big Hill at 51°25′28″N 116°25′17″W on the approach to Kicking Horse Pass on the Canadian Pacific Railway route.
- There used to be a spiral at 48°21′57″N 53°23′45″W at Trinity, Newfoundland on the former Newfoundland Railway.
- There used to be a spiral at Rogers Pass at 51°18′05″N 117°47′29″W that was superseded when the Connaught Tunnel (British Columbia) was built.

=== China ===
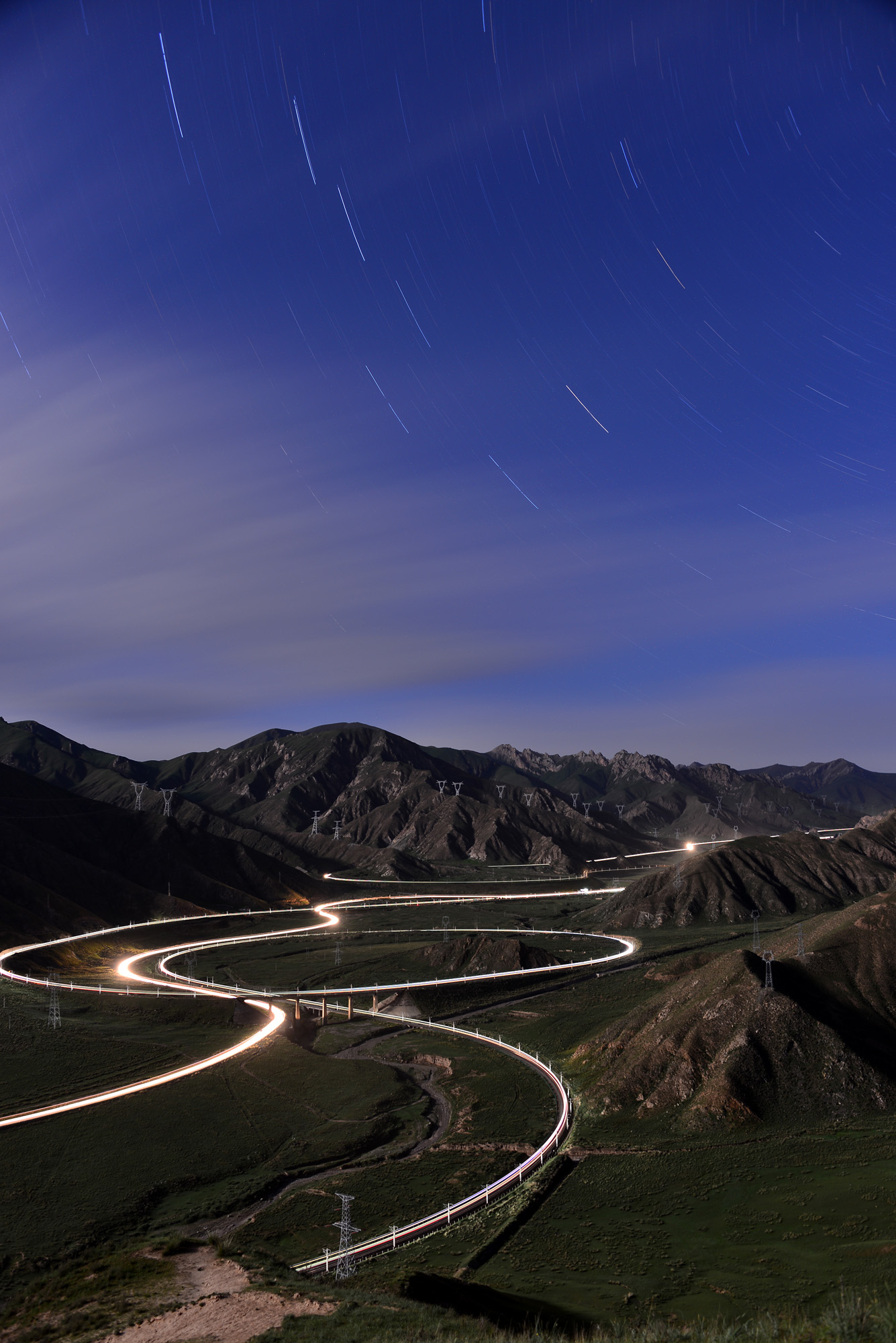
Guanjiao Spiral on Qinghai–Tibet Railway at night. The route containing the spiral was replaced by a 32-km long tunnel (at the time of completion the longest in China) in 2014.

- There used to be a spiral at Guanjiao at 37°05′04″N 98°52′25″E on the Qinghai–Tibet Railway; it was replaced by a tunnel in 2014. (see photo).
- Spiral between Qingshiya and Guanyinshan at 34°16′43″N 106°59′12″E on the Baoji–Chengdu Railway.
- Six spirals on the Chengdu–Kunming Railway at:
  - South of Baishiyan at 28°46′05″N 102°34′25″E.
  - Lewu at 28°17′52″N 102°37′21″E.
  - Wazu at 28°11′54″N 102°33′58″E.
  - Tiekou at 28°13′49″N 102°31′54″E.
  - Ananzhuang at 25°26′53″N 101°49′16″E.
  - Longgudian at 25°25′29″N 101°46′34″E.
- Spiral at Shangshali at 48°47′36″N 121°43′39″E on the Harbin–Manzhouli Railway.
- Spiral at Daheba at 28°19′42″N 106°50′19″E on the Sichuan–Guizhou railway.
- Three spirals on the Liupanshui–Hongguo Railway at:
  - Maocaoping at 26°12′37″N 104°43′01″E.
  - Duchuanzhai at 26°10′20″N 104°43′51″E.
  - Sanjiazhai at 26°09′33″N 104°43′29″E.
- There are four spirals on the Southern Xinjiang Railway at 42°51′35″N 87°31′52″E, 42°50′05″N 87°17′14″E, 42°52′58″N 86°32′35″E and 42°51′37″N 86°27′43″E on a by-passed section between Yu'ergou and Hejing that is now freight only. This line was rebuilt on a shorter route in 2014.

=== Costa Rica ===
Replica of the Brusio Spiral Viaduct at 10°28′44″N 84°49′25″W on the Tren Turistico Arenal, 10 km east of Nuevo Arenal, Guanacaste.

=== Croatia ===
- Spiral between Rijeka-Brajdica and Sušak-Pećine at 45°19′27″N 14°27′45″E on the Rijeka–Karlovac railway, part of International corridor V. The spiral is mainly in a 1,838 m-long (6,030 ft) tunnel.

=== Eritrea ===
- Spiral between Asmara and Arbaroba at 15°21′17″N 38°59′07″E on Eritrean Railways. This spiral pushes the definition of a spiral as the line crosses itself but then immediately crosses back, and it does this in a tunnel.

=== France ===
- Three spirals on the Col de Tende line between Ventimiglia to Cuneo as it passes through France, a further spiral on this line is in Italy.
  - Just north of Fontan at 44°00′58″N 7°33′58″E.
  - Saint Dalmas-de-Tende at 44°03′28″N 7°35′38″E.
  - Tende at 44°05′55″N 7°35′44″E.
- Spiral at Moûtiers at 45.4856°N 6.5404°E between Albertville and Bourg-Saint-Maurice used by TGV.
- Spiral partly in a tunnel at Claveisolles at 46°05′20″N 4°29′07″E on the Paray-le-Monial to Lozanne line (between Saint-Nizier-d'Azergues and Poule-les-Écharmeaux).
- Spiral north of L'Hospitalet près l'Andorre at 42°36′18″N 1°48′55″E on the line between Latour-de-Carol and Ax-les-Thermes.
- There is a spiral south of Paris, called Raccordement du cor de chasse (hunting horn junction), at 48°44′33″N 2°24′43″E, looping around the border between Orly and Villeneuve-le-Roi, linking the Grande Ceinture line (south) and the Choisy-le-Roy to Massy - Verrières line (west).
- There used to be a spiral in the Sayerce tunnel at 42°50′54″N 0°32′46″W on the former Pau–Canfranc railway line between Pau and Zaragoza (Spain) in the Pyrenees. This spiral is now a footpath.
- There was a spiral near Audun-le-Tiche at 49°29′04″N 5°57′57″E on the Fontoy to Esch-sur-Alzette railway line where the Viaduc ferroviaire d'Audun-le-Tiche used to take the line back over itself. The line has been out of use since 1995.
- The proposed spirals between The Gravenne and Montpezat at 44.6950°N 4.2179°E on the partly completed Transcevenole line between Le Puy-en-Velay and Lalevade-d'Ardèche in the Cévennes were never constructed.

=== Germany ===
- Spiral, known as the Rendsburg Loop, on the northern approach to the Rendsburg High Bridge, a railway viaduct and transporter bridge crossing the Kiel Canal in Rendsburg, Schleswig-Holstein at 54°17′58″N 9°40′37″E.
- Spiral on the Wutach Valley Railway at 47°47′30″N 8°30′07″E. The line was built partly for strategic reasons and had to be built to a reasonable gradient in order to haul heavy military trains over it. The alternative, shorter Singen–Waldshut route was not available for this traffic, since it crossed Swiss territory. The line is now a heritage railway.

=== Greece ===
- From 1917 to 1918 there was a spiral on the 600 mm (1 ft 11 5/8 in) gauge Kodza Déré military railway at Vróncho (Greek: βρόγχο) at 41°00′10″N 22°31′01″E between Boymitsa (Greek: Боймица, Μποέμιτσα), (known as Axioupoli (Greek: Αξιούπολη) since 1927) and Pigi (Greek: Πηγή) in the former Paionia Province of Kilkis regional unit, Greek Macedonia.
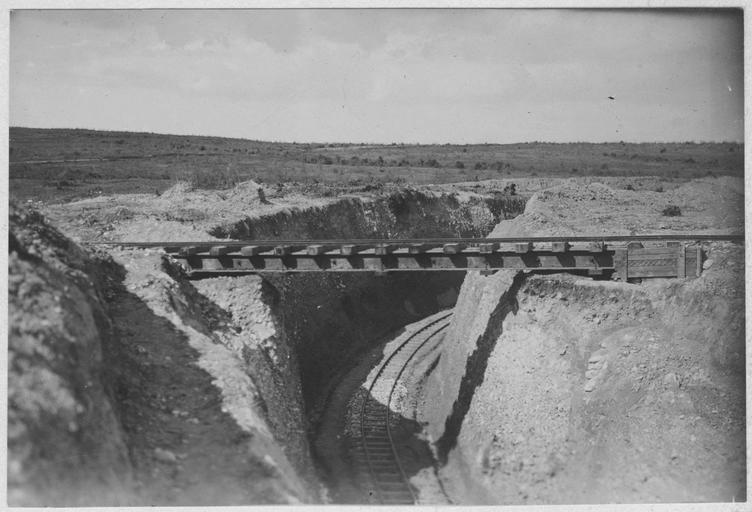
  Vróncho spiral

=== India ===
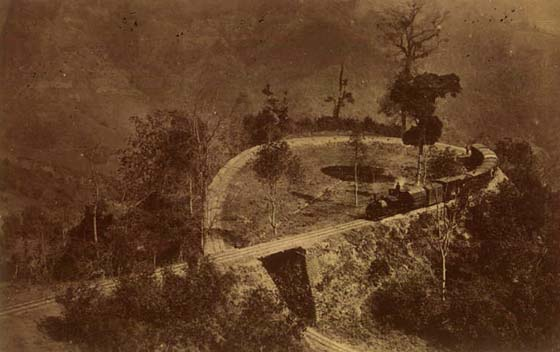
Loop (Agony Point) on the DHR, India

- There are currently three spirals on the Darjeeling Himalayan Railway:
  - Chunbati Loop at 26°50′30″N 88°20′28″E.
  - Agony Point at 26°51′27″N 88°19′40″E.
  - Batasia Loop at 27°01′00″N 88°14′50″E.

The Darjeeling Himalayan Railway originally had five or six spirals but only five in operation at any one time. The line also has six reverses or zig-zags.

- There used to be a spiral at Dhulghat at 21°16′58″N 76°45′41″E between Khandwa and Hingoli on the metre gauge railway, the spiral was apparently removed when the track was upgraded to broad gauge.

=== Iran ===
- Spirals near Dowgal station at 35°52′34″N 52°57′19″E and extensive horseshoe curves in the Alborz Mountains on the Trans-Iranian Railway.

=== Ireland ===
- The St. James's Gate Brewery, Dublin, Ireland formerly had an internal 1 ft 10 in (559 mm) gauge railway with a loop in a tunnel to gain height between buildings.

=== Italy ===
- Spiral at Bortigiadas 40°53′30″N 9°03′23″E on the Sassari-Palau railway on Sardinia.
- Spiral near Lanusei 39°52′21″N 9°32′27″E on the Mandas–Gairo–Arbatax railway on Sardinia.
- Varzo Spiral Tunnel near Iselle di Trasquera 46°12′45″N 8°13′37″E on the Swiss Federal Railways just south of the Southern Portal of the Simplon Tunnel.
- Spiral near Vernante 44°14′12″N 7°32′25″E on the Col de Tende railway from Ventimiglia to Cuneo. There are a further three spirals on this line in French territory.
- Spiral close to Savona at 44°19′45″N 8°26′51″E on the Savona–Altare line.
- Spiral just north of Salerno at 40°41′45″N 14°45′59″E on the Salerno–Mercato San Severino railway.
- Spiral at San Vito Chietino 42°17′48″N 14°26′37″E on the Ferrovia Sangritana line from San Vito to Castel di Sangro. The line exists but is not in service.
- Spiral at Ragusa at 36°55′11″N 14°44′12″E on the approach to Ragusa from Modica on Sicily.
- Spiral between Medaglie d'Oro and Salvator Rosa at 40°50′52″N 14°13′52″E on Line 1 of Naples Metro. Vanvitelli and Quattro Giornale stations are on the loop itself.
- Spiral at Casole Bruzio 39°16′41″N 16°20′21″E on the Cosenza to San Giovanni in Fiore line (line exists but is not in service).
- There were three spirals at 42°44′29″N 12°46′58″E Caprareccia and 42°44′29″N 12°49′12″E and 42°44′45″N 12°49′13″E near San Martino on the former Spoleto–Norcia line.

=== Japan ===
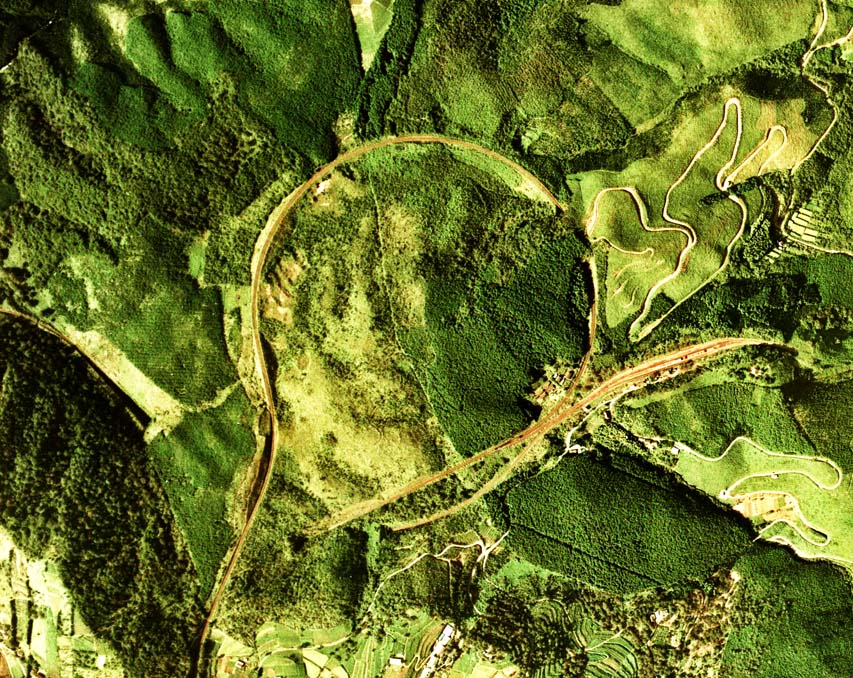
Okoba spiral and zig zag in Hisatsu Line, Japan

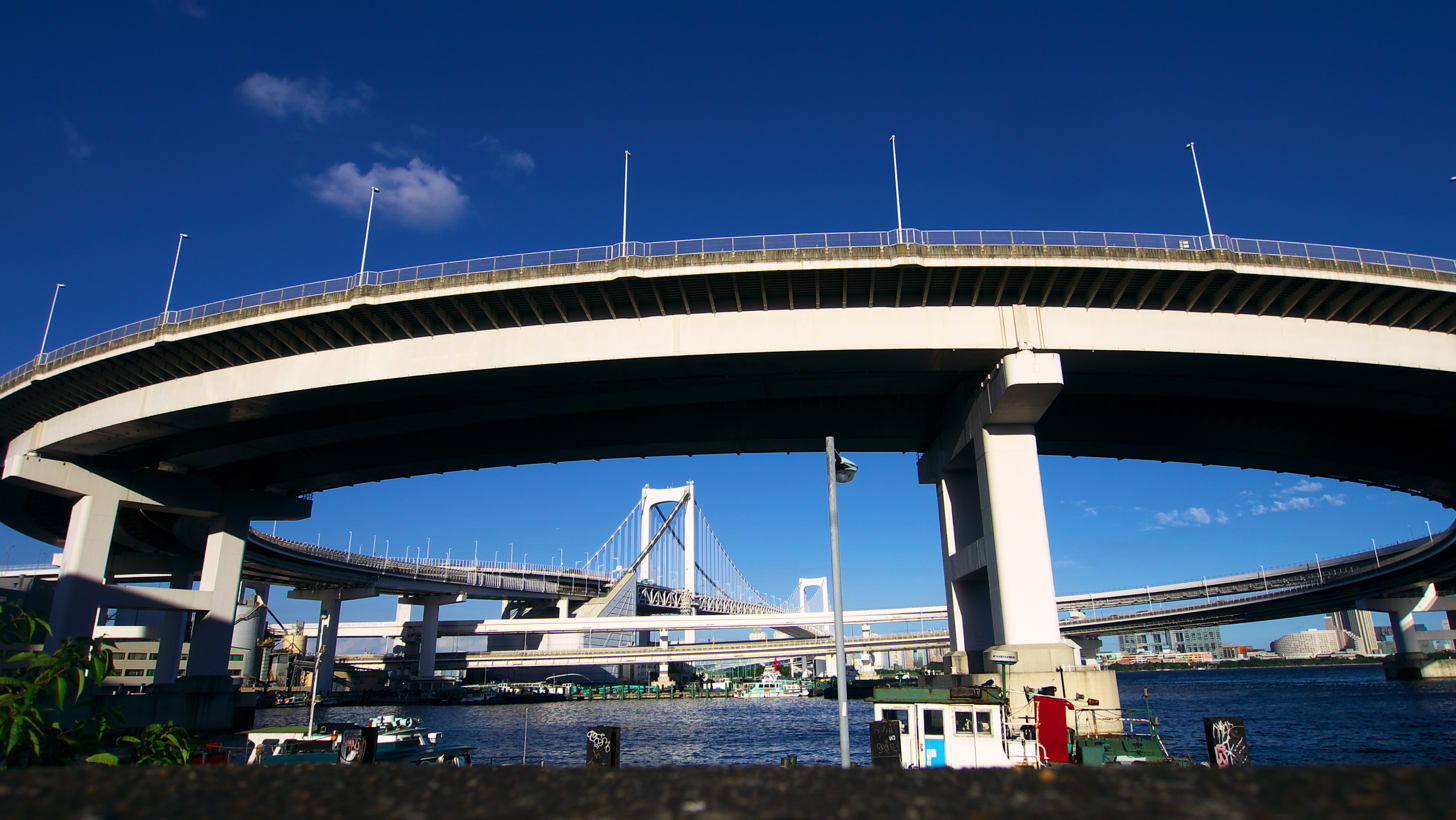
Spiral loop, west of Rainbow Bridge in Tokyo, Japan.

- Spiral South of Echigo-Nakazato at 36°53′49″N 138°50′08″E on the Tokyo bound Jōetsu Line.
- Spiral at Shimizu Tunnel at 36°48′21″N 138°59′32″E on the Tokyo-bound Jōetsu Line.
- Spiral South of Tsuruga Station at 35°36′42″N 136°04′15″E on the Hokuriku Main Line to Shin-Hikida Station.
- Spiral at Okoba Station at 32°09′57″N 130°46′52″E on the Hisatsu Line. Okoba Station is situated on a zig zag part way around the loop.
- Spiral on the Nakamura Line just after its junction with the Yodo Line at 33°09′35″N 133°05′27″E.
- Spiral on the western approach to the Rainbow Bridge at 35°38′14″N 139°45′15″E on New Transit Yurikamome automated transit service in Tokyo.

=== Kenya ===
There are three spirals on the 1,000 mm (3 ft 3 3/8 in) gauge railway line from Kenya to Uganda. This railway has been superseded by the Mombasa–Nairobi Standard Gauge Railway, which has removed the need for spirals by constructing tunnels and bridges.

- Spiral South of Mazeras at 3°59′44″S 39°32′39″E near Mombasa.
- Spiral near Makutano station at : 0°02′36″S 35°38′29″E.
- Spiral near Equator station at 0°00′26″S 35°33′04″E.

=== Madagascar ===
- Spiral at Anjiro at 18°51′57″S 47°58′00″E on the main line from Antananarivo to Toamasina.

=== Mexico ===
- Spiral between Creel and San Rafael at 27°39′17″N 107°44′21″W on the Ferrocarril Chihuahua al Pacífico.

=== Myanmar ===
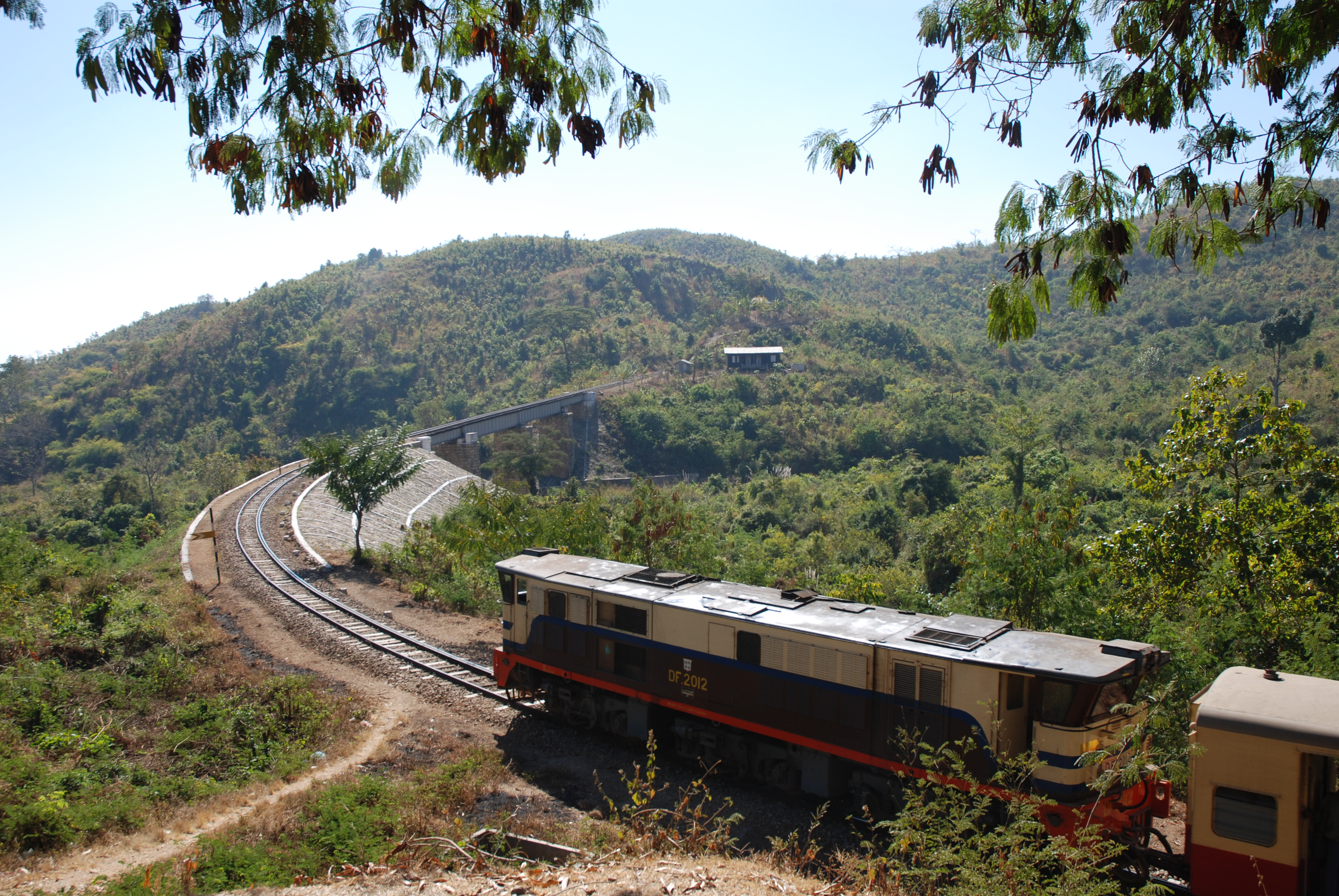
Spiral in Thazi – Taunggyi line, Myanmar

- One spiral on the Burma Mines Railway at 23°06′13″N 97°19′23″E.
- One spiral close to Shwenyaung at 20°44′06″N 96°51′48″E on the Thazi-Taunggyi line.

=== New Zealand ===
- Raurimu Spiral at 39°07′13″S 175°24′04″E on the North Island Main Trunk. The line is single track and involves two short tunnels around a suitable hill.
- Spiral on the Driving Creek Railway at 36°44′07″S 175°30′20″E. This railway also has several reverses or zig-zags.
- There used to be a spiral at 38°42′24″S 175°21′55″E on the Ellis and Burnand Tramway, Ongarue, which closed in 1958 and is now part of the Timber Trail.

=== Norway ===
- Spiral on the Flåm Line between Myrdal and Flåm at 60°44′38″N 7°07′53″E.
- Spiral on the Vestfold Line around the town of Tønsberg at 59°16′43″N 10°24′30″E.

=== Peru ===
- Spiral between San Bartolome and Matucana at 11°52′01″S 76°25′15″W on the Central Railway.

=== Russia ===
- Spiral just north of Indyuk at 44°14′48″N 39°14′32″E on the North Caucasus Railway route from Tuapse (Tуапсе) through Gornyy to Belorechensk (Белореченск).
- There used to be a spiral at "Devil's Bridge", 46°59′14″N 142°06′54″E on the now abandoned line from Kholmsk to Yushno-Sakhalinsk on Sakhalin Island.

=== Serbia ===
- Spiral at Jatare at 43°48′03″N 19°31′11″E on the Šargan Eight Heritage Railway in Western Serbia between from Mokra Gora and Šargan Vitasi.

=== Slovakia ===
- Spiral at Telgártska slučka at 48°51′18″N 20°11′28″E on the Brezno to Gelnica Line. The spiral is constructed of two viaducts and a 1,200 m (3,900 ft) tunnel.

=== South Africa ===
- Spiral near Komga at 32°32′03″S 27°59′32″E on the branch line to Mthatha as it descends to the Great Kei River.
- Spiral at Van Reenen's Pass at 28°22′15″S 29°23′17″E on the line from Harrismith to Ladysmith.

=== South Korea ===
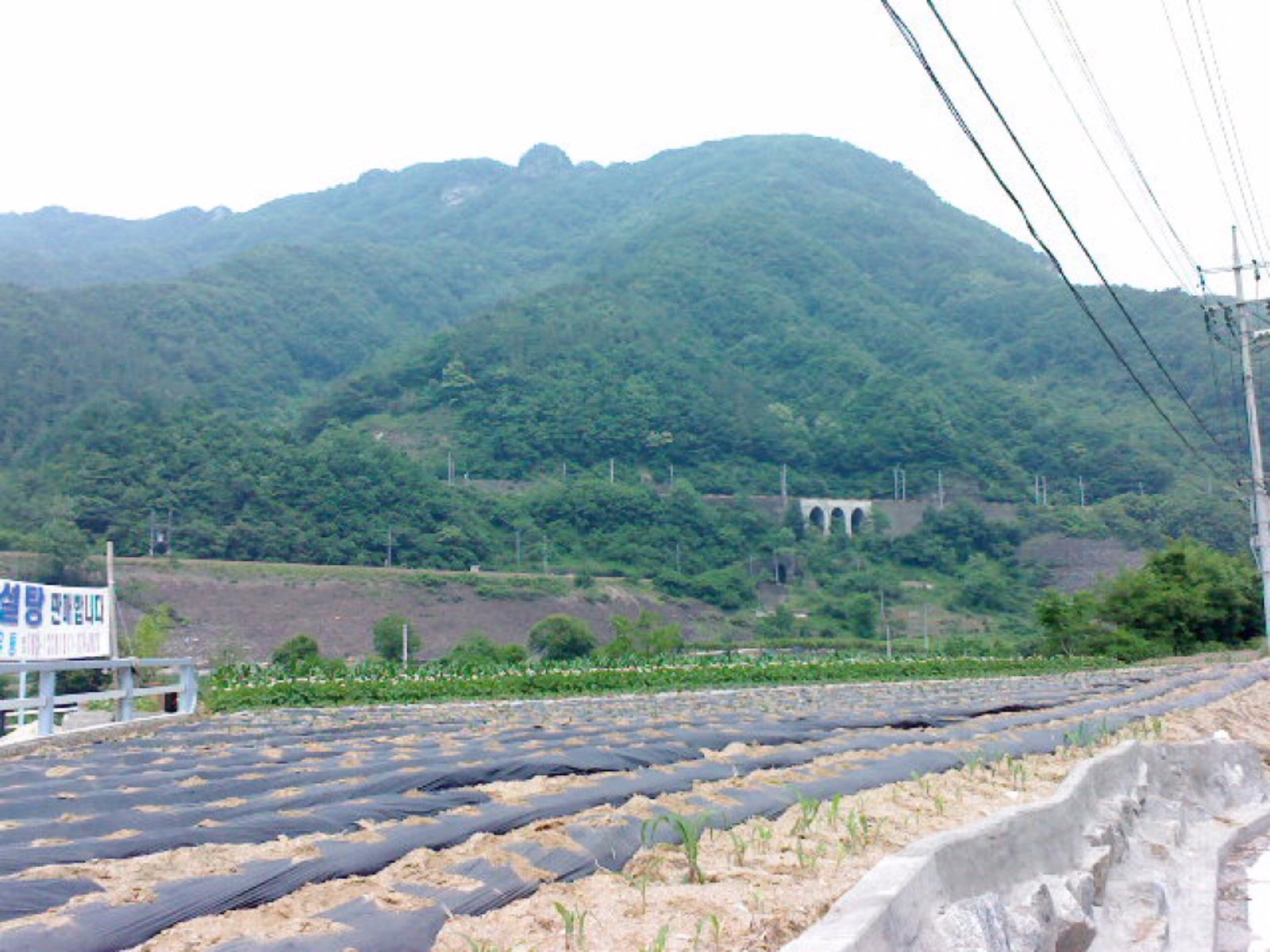
Geumdae 2nd Tunnel in Jungang Line, South Korea

- Spiral at Hambaek 1st Tunnel at 37°13′19″N 128°42′10″E between Hambaek station and Jodong station on the Hambaek Line;– one loop, single track.
- Spiral at Solan Tunnel at 37°09′31″N 129°01′51″E between East Baeksan station and Dogye station on the Yeongdong Line. There is one loop on a single track railway but double track is installed in the middle of the tunnel to enable trains from opposing directions to pass each other.
- There used to be a spiral at Daegang Tunnel at 36°55′15″N 128°22′46″E between Danseong station and Jungnyeong station on the Jungang Line;– one loop, single track. A new double track tunnel has opened which by-passes the line with the spiral, which has since closed.
- There used to be a spiral at Ddwari Tunnel at 37°16′26″N 128°01′18″E between Geumgyo station and Chiak station on Jungang Line. A new double track tunnel has opened which by-passes the line with the spiral, which has since closed.

=== Spain ===
- Spiral near Toses at 42°19′31″N 2°01′51″E on the Ripoll to Latour-de-Carol, France line.
- Spiral at La Granja de San Vicente at 42°36′18″N 6°17′18″W on the Palencia to A Coruña line.

=== Sri Lanka ===
- Spiral at Demodara railway station at 6°54′10″N 81°03′46″E on the line from Bandarawela to Badulla. Demodara railway station is located above the spiral tunnel.

=== Switzerland ===
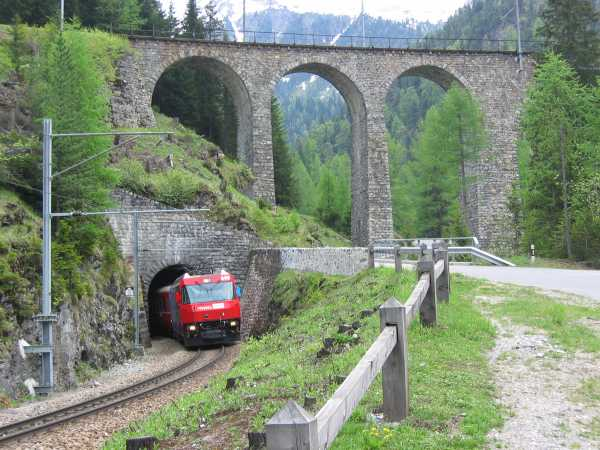
Toua spiral tunnel on the RhB Albulabahn

- The Gotthard railway has spirals and horseshoe curves or bends mostly in tunnels on its standard gauge, double track line. The spirals are:
  - North of Wassen at Pfaffensprung on the Northern approach at 46°43′19″N 8°36′34″E, this loop is followed by two horseshoe bends around Wassen.
  - Piottino spirals on the Southern approach at 46°29′41″N 8°44′13″E and at 46°29′11″N 8°46′08″E.
  - Biaschina double spiral near Anzonico at 46°25′25″N 8°51′43″E.
- RhB Albulabahn has four spirals, mainly in tunnels, on its metre gauge single track. The spirals are at:
  - Filisur at 46°40′30″N 9°41′06″E.
  - South of Bergün at 46°36′11″N 9°43′03″E.
  - Double spiral North of Preda at 46°35′46″N 9°44′33″E.
  - It could also be argued that the horseshoe curves immediately South of Bergün at 46°37′16″N 9°45′09″E also form a spiral as it appears that one curve overlaps the other.
- Brusio spiral viaduct at 46°15′05″N 10°07′15″E on RhB Berninabahn. This is a fine example of an open spiral mainly on the Brusio spiral viaduct on a metre gauge single track railway.
- Spiral South of Gletsch at 46°33′28″N 8°21′18″E on the former Furka Oberalp Bahn, now Dampfbahn Furka-Bergstrecke Heritage Railway. This is a single track partial rack railway with the catenary equipment removed.
- Spiral East of Grengiols at 46°22′41″N 8°05′41″E on the former Furka Oberalp Bahn, now Matterhorn Gotthard Bahn, between Grengiols and Lax.

=== Taiwan ===
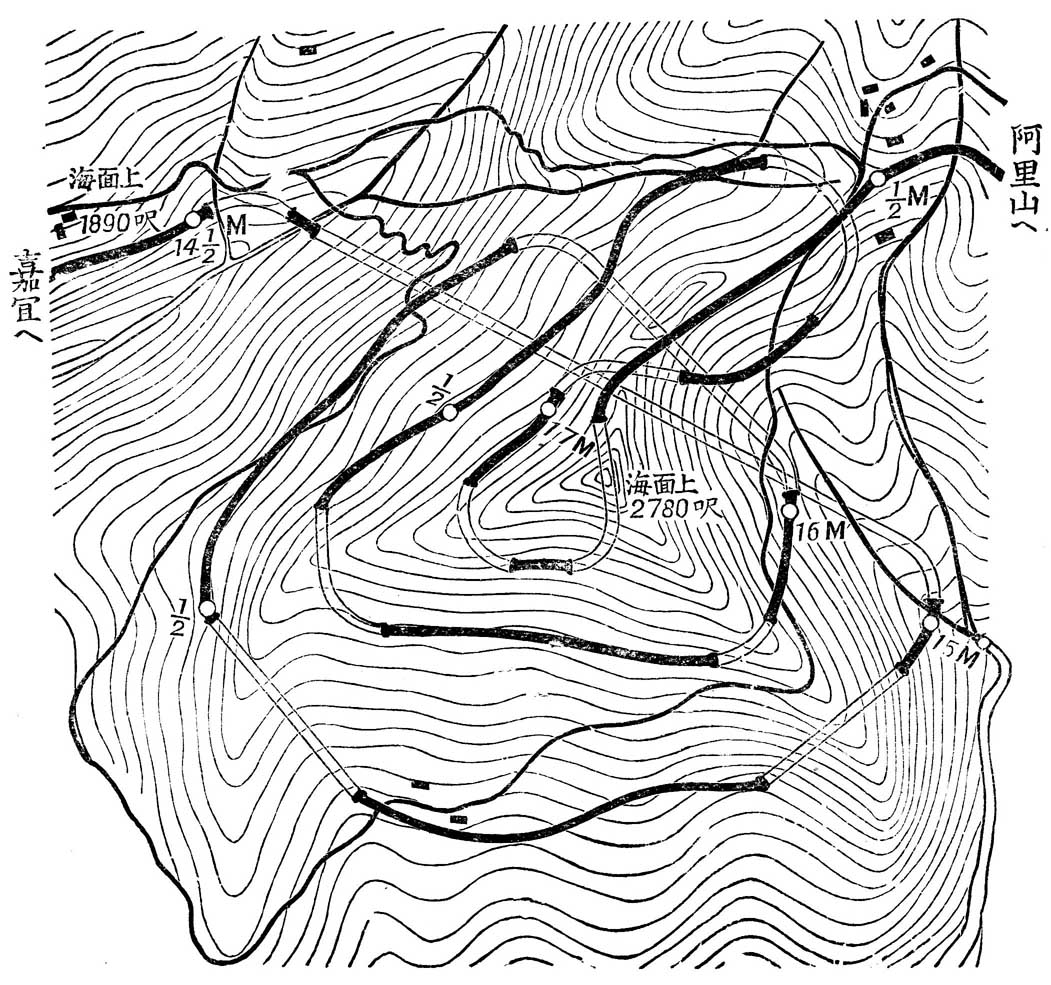
Triple spiral loop on the Alishan Forest Railway

- Triple spiral (with long sections in tunnels) at Dulishan at 23°32′11″N 120°36′07″E on the Alishan Forest Railway. Track length is 5 kilometers, while the endpoints of the spiral are only 570 meters apart horizontally and 233 meters vertically.

=== Uganda ===
- There used to be a spiral at Circle Hill 0°11′25″N 30°21′48″E on the Western Uganda Extension of the Kenya to Uganda Railway Line to Kasese.

=== United Kingdom ===
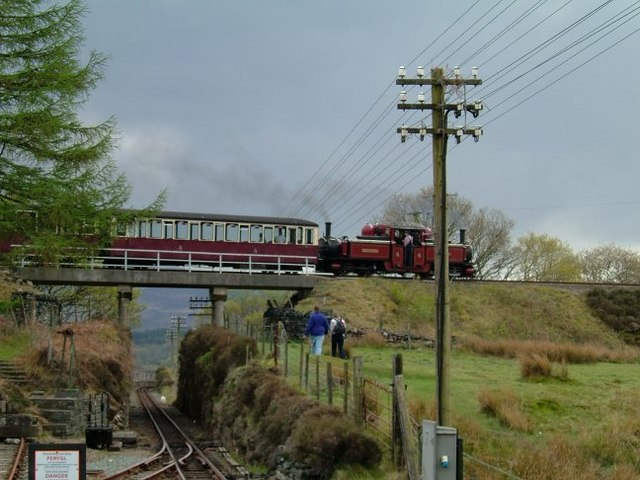
The bridge on the spiral loop at Dduallt on the Ffestiniog Railway, Wales.

- Spiral around Dduallt railway station at 52°57′37″N 3°58′07″W on the Ffestiniog Railway in Wales.
- The line at 50°26′42″N 4°28′36″W from Moorswater cement terminal, through Coombe Junction and Liskeard on the Looe Valley Line and on over Moorswater Viaduct forms a complete spiral, climbing up to join the main line at Liskeard. Not all parts are used by passenger trains.

=== United States ===
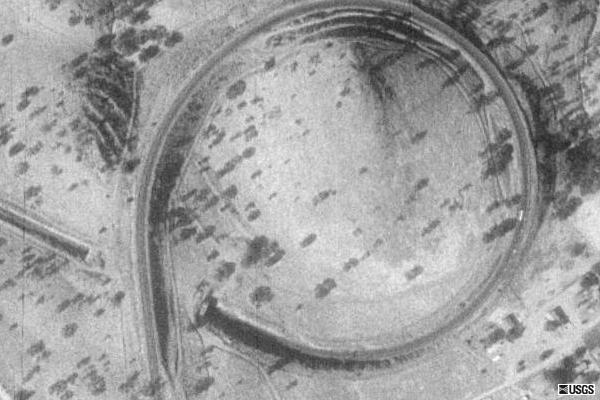
Tehachapi Loop, on the Union Pacific Railroad, California, United States, viewed from the air.

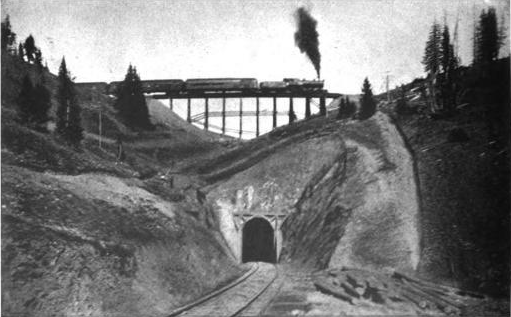
1903 view of Riflesight Notch loop, near Rollins Pass in Colorado

- Tehachapi Loop, at Tehachapi, California at 35°12′03″N 118°32′13″W on the former Southern Pacific Railroad, now part of Union Pacific Railroad.
- Williams Loop, east of East Quincy, California at 39°54′36″N 120°48′28″W on the former Western Pacific Railroad now part of Union Pacific Railroad.
- Hiwassee Loop, also known as the Hook and Eye; 2 miles NNE of Farner, Tennessee at 35°10′52″N 84°17′59″W on the former Atlanta, Knoxville and Northern Railway now operated as a heritage railroad by the Tennessee Valley Railroad Museum, which operates excursion trains from Etowah, Tennessee to Copperhill, Tennessee via the loop, as well as trains just to the loop and back from Etowah.
- Georgetown Loop, at Georgetown, Colorado at 39°42′02″N 105°42′31″W on the former Colorado Central Railroad. The spiral was completed in 1884, abandoned and dismantled in 1939, rebuilt between 1972 and 1984 and is now owned by History Colorado and operated as the Georgetown Loop Railroad.
- The MAX Red Line, a light rail line in Portland, Oregon, loops over itself at 45°31′51″N 122°33′49″W in the vicinity of the Gateway Transit Center.
- In the Loop District of the Alaska Railroad at 60°39′36″N 149°02′28″W between mileposts 48 and 51 northeast of Seward, Alaska, there was a spiral and a horseshoe curve both on an extensive range of timber trestles up to 106 feet high. Track relocation in 1951 removed all of this but added a new horseshoe at milepost 48.
- Abandoned spiral at Riflesight Notch Loop at Rollinsville, Colorado at 39°54′00″N 105°42′47″W on the former Denver and Salt Lake Railway route over Rollins Pass. The spiral was bypassed by the Moffat Tunnel built in 1928, and was dismantled in 1935.
- Abandoned spiral called Double Circle, or Double Loop, or The Golden Circle, at 39°59′07″N 112°02′39″W east of Eureka, Utah on the former Tintic branch of the Denver and Rio Grande Western Railroad. It was bypassed in 1940 and the branch removed in 1943.
- Abandoned spiral on the Roaring Camp and Big Trees Railroad in Santa Cruz County, California at 37°02′33″N 122°03′54″W. The spiral was completed in 1963. The spiral was bypassed by two switchbacks after a trestle fire in 1976.
- There were five spirals on the Morenci Southern Railroad between the mines at Morenci, Arizona and Guthrie, Arizona where a connection was made to the Arizona and New Mexico Railway. In 1914, some of the trestle bridges were declared at risk of collapse, leading to the replacement of three of the loops with a series of switchbacks (zig-zags) to navigate the change in elevation. The line was abandoned on 3 May 1922.

== See also ==
- Spiral bridge – road equivalent
- Hairpin turn
- List of steepest gradients on adhesion railways
- Zig Zag Railways
