= Lac des Sapins =

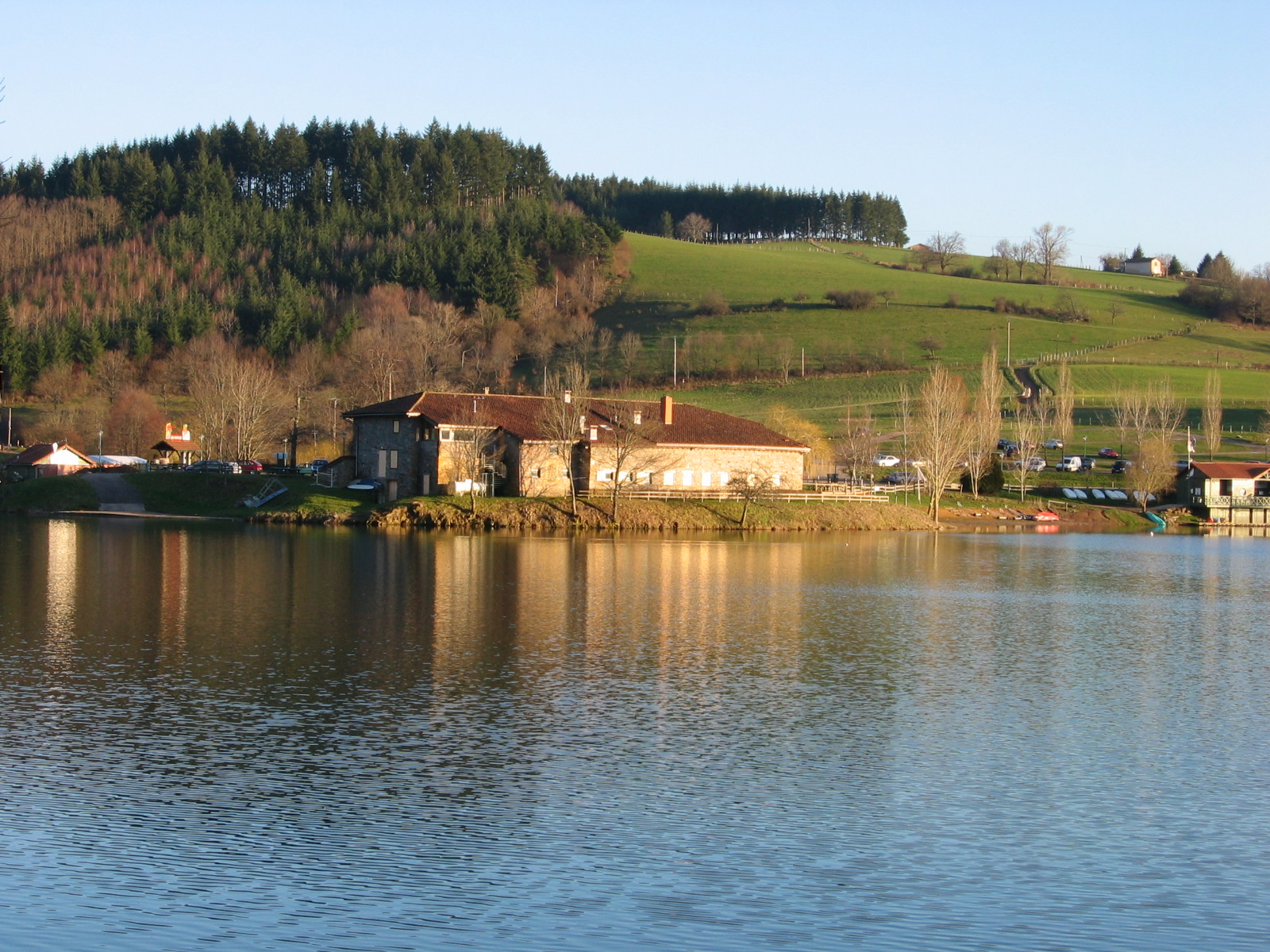
- view of Lac des Sapins

- Location within Auvergne-Rhône-Alpes
- Location: Cublize, Rhône
- Coordinates: 46°0′25″N 4°22′15″E
- Type: reservoir
- Basin countries: France
- Surface area: 40 ha (99 acres)
- Shore length^{1}: 4.75 km (2.95 mi)
- Surface elevation: 440 m (1,440 ft)
- ^{1} Shore length is not a well-defined measure.

Lac des Sapins, literally translated into English as 'the lake of the fir-trees', is an artificial lake located in the region of Rhône-Alpes. It is situated 65 km northwest of the city of Lyon.

== History ==
Construction of the lake began in the summer of 1967 by Louis Gueydon. The lake was built to try to develop the tourist industry in the region after a decline in industry in rural areas. In 1983, a camping park next to the lake was built with chalets, caravans etc. The investment proved successful, and in 1990, the camping park was extended, with the chalets and caravans upgraded or renovated. Multiple sports activities were proposed (mountain biking, wind-surfing, volleyball and acrobranching).
