= Aigueperse =

Aigueperse is the name of two communes in France:

- Aigueperse, Puy-de-Dôme, in the Puy-de-Dôme département
- Aigueperse, Rhône, in the Rhône département
