= Saint-Clément-de-Vers =

- Commune
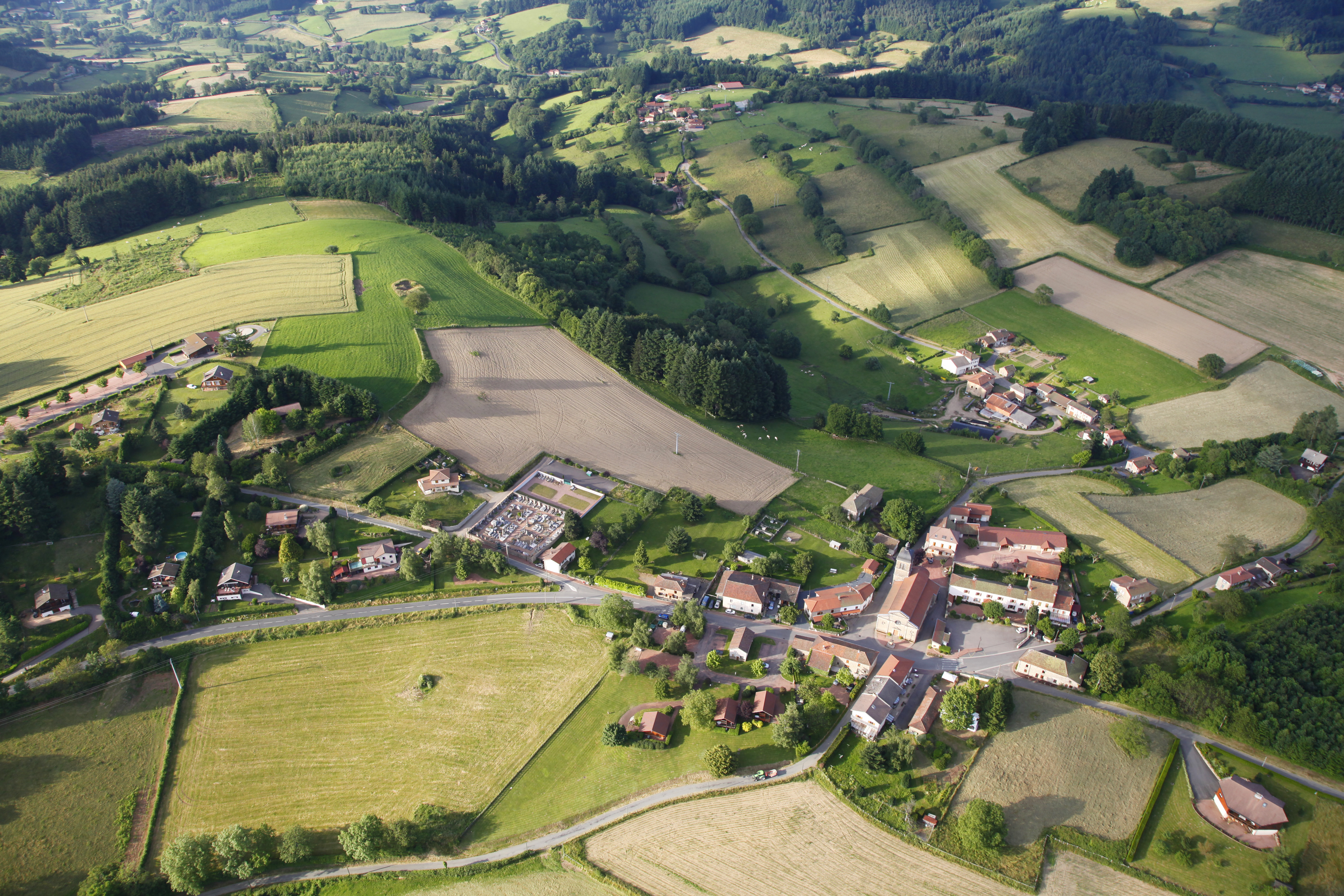
- Aerial view of Saint-Clément-de-Vers
- Location of Saint-Clément-de-Vers
- Location within France Location within Auvergne-Rhône-Alpes
- Coordinates: 46°13′38″N 4°24′13″E
- Country: France
- Region: Auvergne-Rhône-Alpes
- Department: Rhône
- Arrondissement: Villefranche-sur-Saône
- Canton: Thizy-les-Bourgs
- Intercommunality: Saône-Beaujolais

Government
  - Mayor (2020–2026): Sylviane Ternisien
- Area^{1}: 8.6 km^{2} (3.3 sq mi)
- Elevation: 512 m (1,680 ft)
- Highest elevation: 664 m (2,178 ft)
- Lowest elevation: 418 m (1,371 ft)
- Population (2023): 206
  - Density: 24/km^{2} (62/sq mi)
- Time zone: UTC+01:00 (CET)
  - Summer (DST): UTC+02:00 (CEST)
- INSEE/Postal code: 69186 /69790
- ^{1} French Land Register data, which excludes lakes, ponds, glaciers > 1 km^{2} (0.386 sq mi or 247 acres) and river estuaries.

Saint-Clément-de-Vers is a commune in the Rhône department in eastern France.

== Demography ==
Historical population
Year	Pop.	±% p.a.
1968	203	—
1975	200	−0.21%
1982	170	−2.29%
1990	177	+0.51%
1999	213	+2.08%
2007	217	+0.23%
2012	217	+0.00%
2017	226	+0.82%
2023	206	−1.53%
Source: INSEE

== See also ==
- Communes of the Rhône department
