= Canton of Thizy-les-Bourgs =

Coordinates: 46.0333°N 4.3122°E

Thizy-les-Bourgs
- Canton
- Country: France
- Region: Auvergne-Rhône-Alpes
- Department: Rhône
- No. of communes: {{{nbcomm}}}
- Area: 494.06 km^{2} (190.76 sq mi)
- Population (2023): 26,298
  - Density: 53.228/km^{2} (137.86/sq mi)
- INSEE code: 6911

The Canton of Thizy-les-Bourgs is a French administrative division, located in the Rhône department.

The canton was established by decree of 27 February 2014 which came into force in March 2015.

== Composition ==
The canton of Thizy-les-Bourgs is composed of 21 communes:

Communes	Population (2012)
Aigueperse	246
Amplepuis	5,090
Azolette	127
Chénelette	317
Claveisolles	640
Cours	4,624
Cublize	1,260
Deux-Grosnes	1,957
Meaux-la-Montagne	246
Poule-les-Écharmeaux	1,105
Propières	464
Ranchal	311
Ronno	613
Saint-Bonnet-des-Bruyères	381
Saint-Bonnet-le-Troncy	305
Saint-Clément-de-Vers	217
Saint-Igny-de-Vers	601
Saint-Jean-la-Bussière	1,147
Saint-Nizier-d'Azergues	723
Saint-Vincent-de-Reins	671
Thizy-les-Bourgs	6,369

== See also ==
- Cantons of the Rhône department
- Communes of the Rhône department
