= Saint-Igny-de-Vers =

- Commune
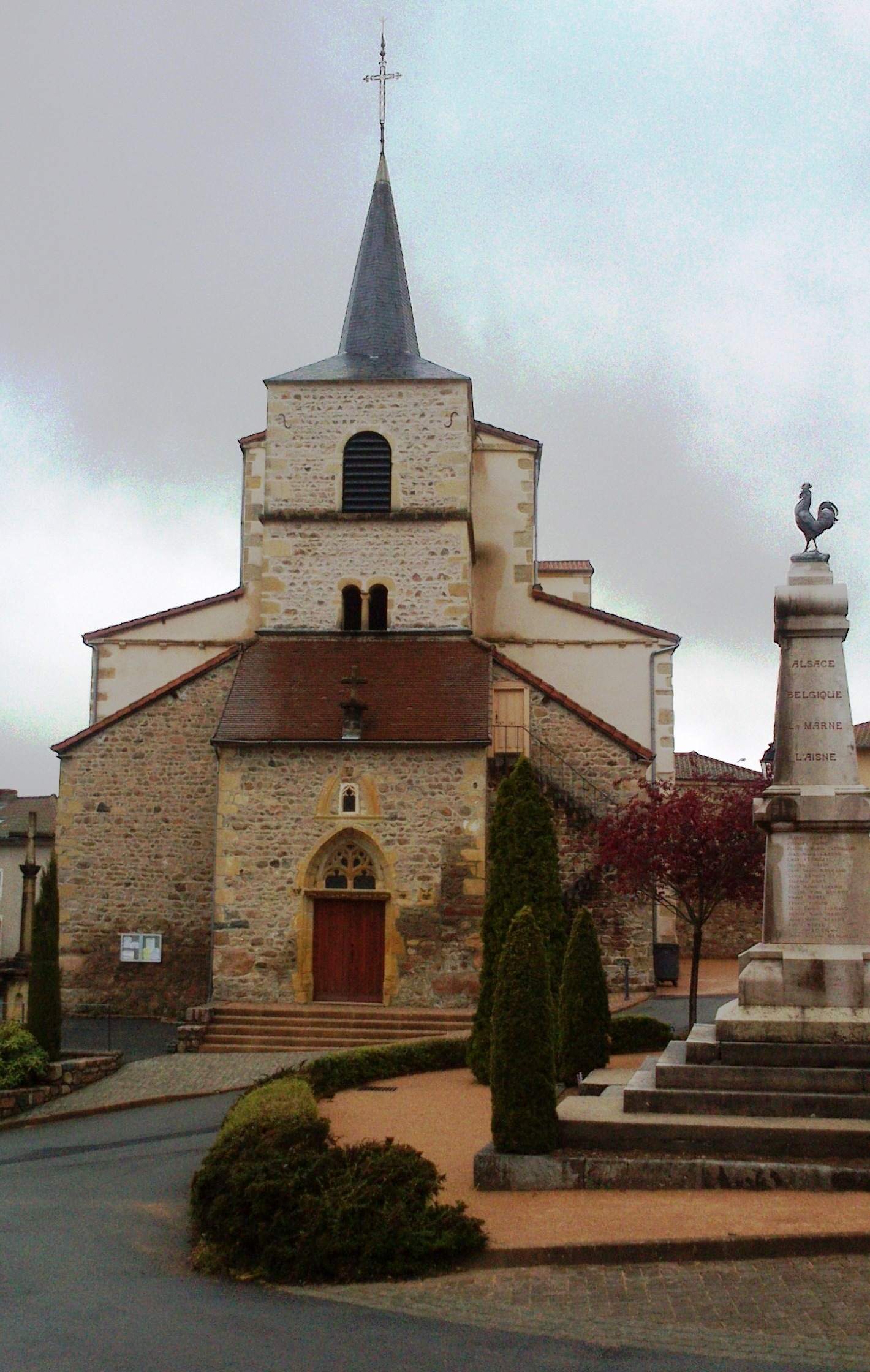
- The church of Saint-Jean-Baptiste and the war memorial
- Location of Saint-Igny-de-Vers
- Location within France Location within Auvergne-Rhône-Alpes
- Coordinates: 46°14′29″N 4°26′12″E
- Country: France
- Region: Auvergne-Rhône-Alpes
- Department: Rhône
- Arrondissement: Villefranche-sur-Saône
- Canton: Thizy-les-Bourgs
- Intercommunality: Saône-Beaujolais

Government
  - Mayor (2020–2026): Alain Morin
- Area^{1}: 27.35 km^{2} (10.56 sq mi)
- Highest elevation: 943 m (3,094 ft)
- Lowest elevation: 407 m (1,335 ft)
- Population (2023): 593
  - Density: 21.7/km^{2} (56.2/sq mi)
- Time zone: UTC+01:00 (CET)
  - Summer (DST): UTC+02:00 (CEST)
- INSEE/Postal code: 69209 /69790
- ^{1} French Land Register data, which excludes lakes, ponds, glaciers > 1 km^{2} (0.386 sq mi or 247 acres) and river estuaries.

Saint-Igny-de-Vers (French pronunciation: [sɛ̃t‿iɲi də vɛʁ]) is a commune in the Rhône department in eastern France.

== See also ==
- Communes of the Rhône department
