= Propières =

- Commune
- Location of Propières
- Location within France Location within Auvergne-Rhône-Alpes
- Coordinates: 46°11′30″N 4°26′14″E
- Country: France
- Region: Auvergne-Rhône-Alpes
- Department: Rhône
- Arrondissement: Villefranche-sur-Saône
- Canton: Thizy-les-Bourgs
- Intercommunality: Saône-Beaujolais

Government
  - Mayor (2020–2026): Christian Gilgenkrantz
- Area^{1}: 16 km^{2} (6.2 sq mi)
- Elevation: 670 m (2,200 ft)
- Highest elevation: 972 m (3,189 ft)
- Lowest elevation: 533 m (1,749 ft)
- Population (2023): 484
  - Density: 30/km^{2} (78/sq mi)
- Time zone: UTC+01:00 (CET)
  - Summer (DST): UTC+02:00 (CEST)
- INSEE/Postal code: 69161 /69790
- ^{1} French Land Register data, which excludes lakes, ponds, glaciers > 1 km^{2} (0.386 sq mi or 247 acres) and river estuaries.

Propières (French pronunciation: [pʁɔpjɛʁ]) is a commune in the Rhône department in eastern France.

== Demography ==
Historical population
Year	Pop.	±% p.a.
1968	519	—
1975	481	−1.08%
1982	434	−1.46%
1990	404	−0.89%
1999	419	+0.41%
2007	457	+1.09%
2012	464	+0.30%
2017	468	+0.17%
2023	484	+0.56%
Source: INSEE

== See also ==
- Communes of the Rhône department
