= Azolette =

- Commune
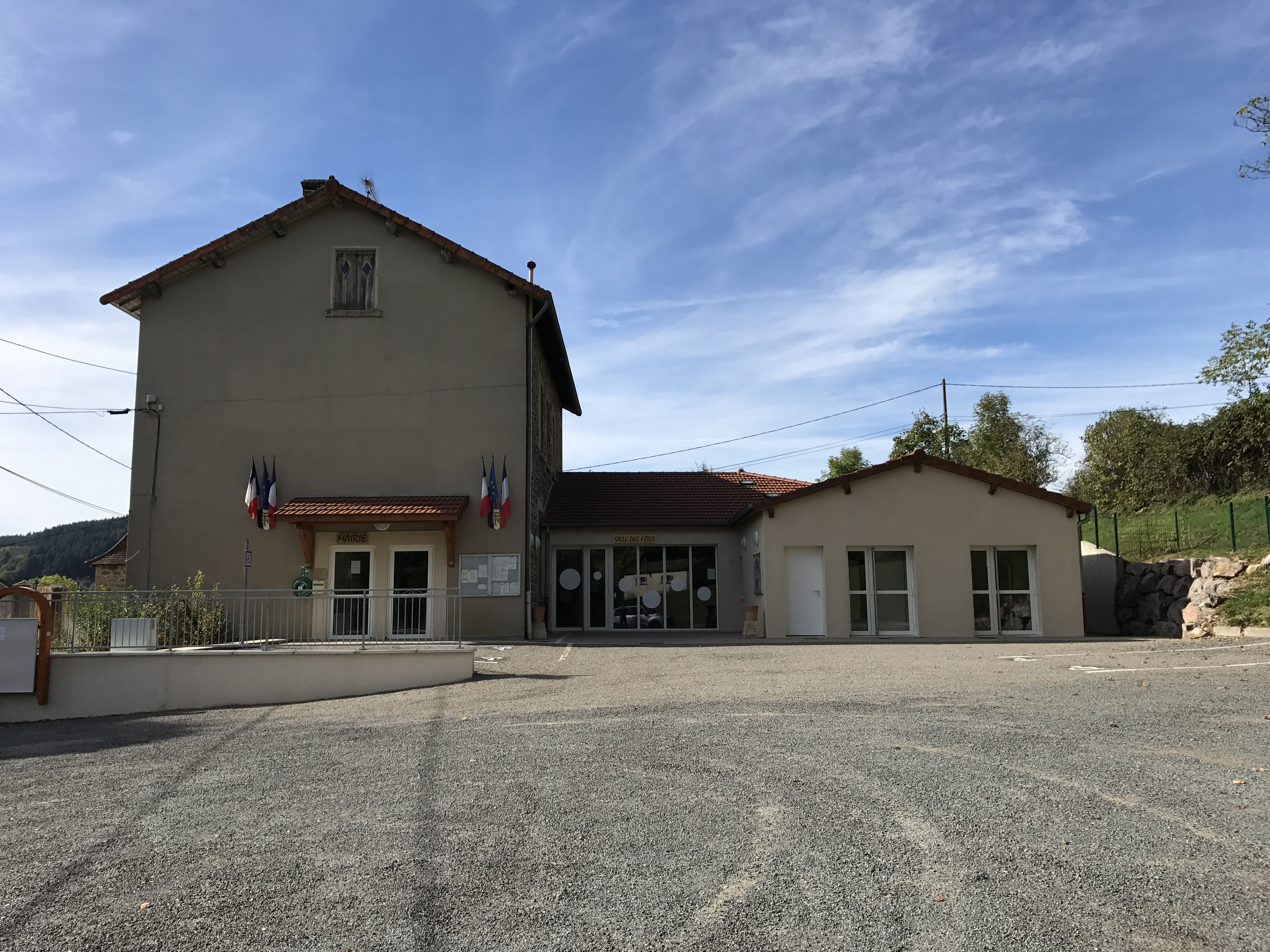
- The town hall of Azolette

- Coat of arms
- Location of Azolette
- Location within France Location within Auvergne-Rhône-Alpes
- Coordinates: 46°11′35″N 4°25′07″E
- Country: France
- Region: Auvergne-Rhône-Alpes
- Department: Rhône
- Arrondissement: Villefranche-sur-Saône
- Canton: Thizy-les-Bourgs
- Intercommunality: Saône Beaujolais

Government
  - Mayor (2020–2026): Nicole Briday
- Area^{1}: 4.18 km^{2} (1.61 sq mi)
- Elevation: 540 m (1,770 ft)
- Highest elevation: 650 m (2,130 ft)
- Lowest elevation: 480 m (1,570 ft)
- Population (2023): 120
  - Density: 29/km^{2} (74/sq mi)
- Time zone: UTC+01:00 (CET)
  - Summer (DST): UTC+02:00 (CEST)
- INSEE/Postal code: 69016 /69790
- ^{1} French Land Register data, which excludes lakes, ponds, glaciers > 1 km^{2} (0.386 sq mi or 247 acres) and river estuaries.

Azolette is a commune of the Rhône department in eastern France.

== Population ==
Historical population
Year	Pop.	±% p.a.
1968	115	—
1975	128	+1.54%
1982	114	−1.64%
1990	74	−5.26%
1999	116	+5.12%
2007	119	+0.32%
2012	127	+1.31%
2017	120	−1.13%
2023	120	+0.00%
Source: INSEE

== See also ==
Communes of the Rhône department
