= Claveisolles =

- Commune
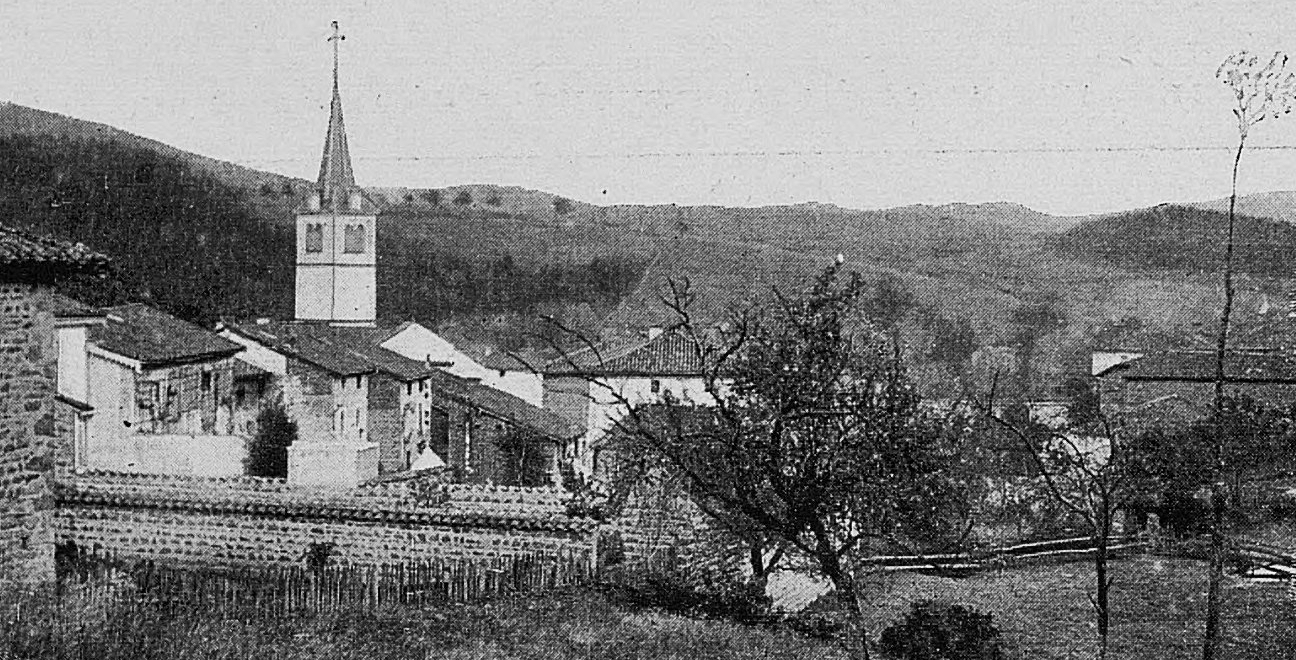
- A general view of Claveisolles, at the beginning of the 20th century
- Location of Claveisolles
- Location within France Location within Auvergne-Rhône-Alpes
- Coordinates: 46°06′03″N 4°29′41″E
- Country: France
- Region: Auvergne-Rhône-Alpes
- Department: Rhône
- Arrondissement: Villefranche-sur-Saône
- Canton: Thizy-les-Bourgs
- Intercommunality: CA de l'Ouest Rhodanien

Government
  - Mayor (2020–2026): Dominique Despras
- Area^{1}: 28.33 km^{2} (10.94 sq mi)
- Elevation: 483 m (1,585 ft)
- Highest elevation: 886 m (2,907 ft)
- Lowest elevation: 394 m (1,293 ft)
- Population (2023): 577
  - Density: 20.4/km^{2} (52.8/sq mi)
- Time zone: UTC+01:00 (CET)
  - Summer (DST): UTC+02:00 (CEST)
- INSEE/Postal code: 69060 /69870
- ^{1} French Land Register data, which excludes lakes, ponds, glaciers > 1 km^{2} (0.386 sq mi or 247 acres) and river estuaries.

Claveisolles (French pronunciation: [klavezɔl]) is a commune in the Rhône department in eastern France.

== See also ==
- Communes of the Rhône department
