= Saint-Vincent-de-Reins =

- Commune
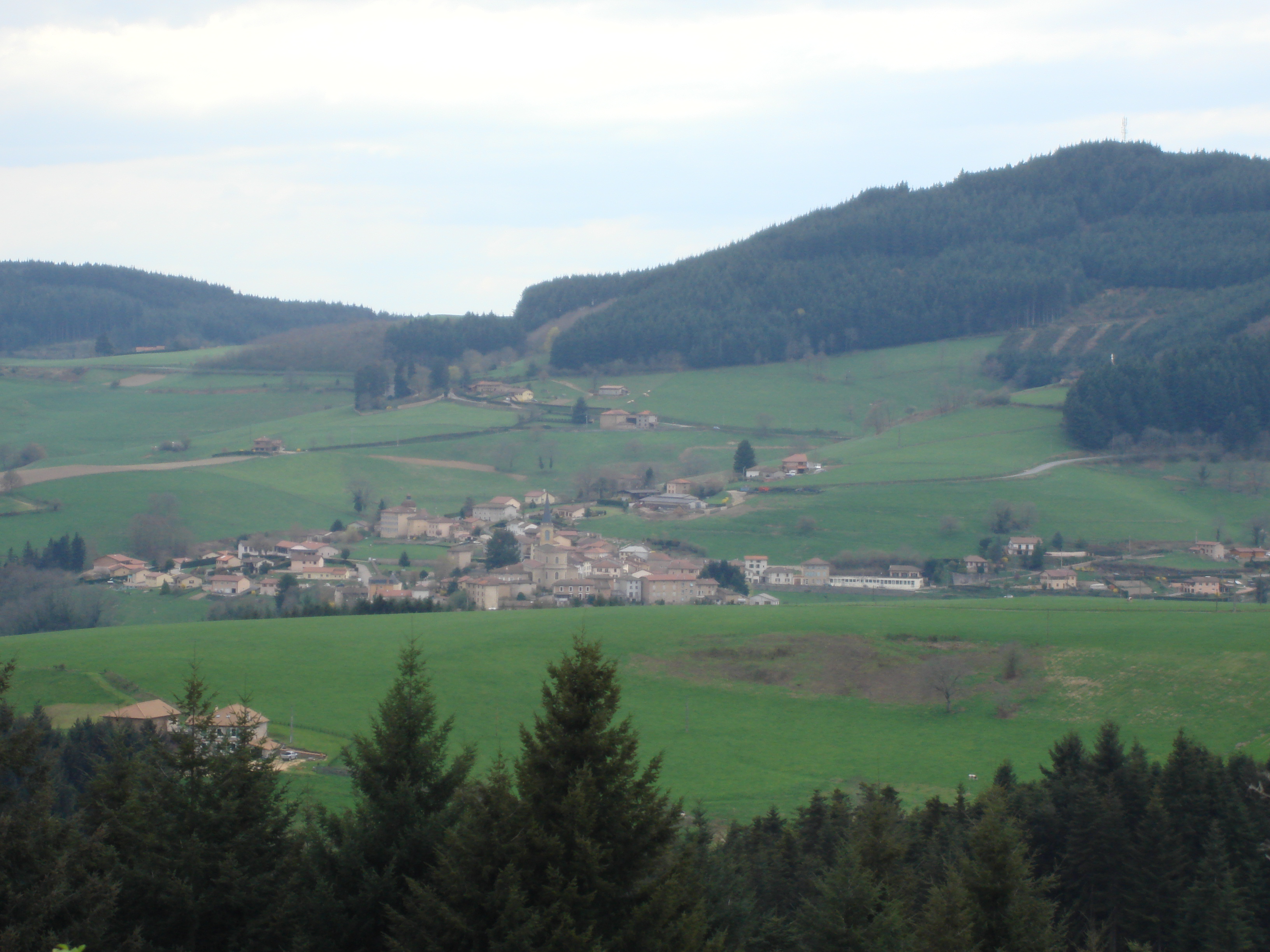
- A general view of Saint-Vincent-de-Reins

- Coat of arms
- Location of Saint-Vincent-de-Reins
- Location within France Location within Auvergne-Rhône-Alpes
- Coordinates: 46°04′31″N 4°23′18″E
- Country: France
- Region: Auvergne-Rhône-Alpes
- Department: Rhône
- Arrondissement: Villefranche-sur-Saône
- Canton: Thizy-les-Bourgs
- Intercommunality: CA de l'Ouest Rhodanien

Government
  - Mayor (2020–2026): Jean-François Terrier
- Area^{1}: 13.87 km^{2} (5.36 sq mi)
- Elevation: 698 m (2,290 ft)
- Highest elevation: 903 m (2,963 ft)
- Lowest elevation: 476 m (1,562 ft)
- Population (2023): 635
  - Density: 45.8/km^{2} (119/sq mi)
- Time zone: UTC+01:00 (CET)
  - Summer (DST): UTC+02:00 (CEST)
- INSEE/Postal code: 69240 /69240
- ^{1} French Land Register data, which excludes lakes, ponds, glaciers > 1 km^{2} (0.386 sq mi or 247 acres) and river estuaries.

Saint-Vincent-de-Reins (French pronunciation: [sɛ̃ vɛ̃sɑ̃ də ʁɛ̃s]) is a commune in the Rhône department in eastern France.

== See also ==
- Communes of the Rhône department
