= Saint-Nizier-d'Azergues =

- Commune
- Location of Saint-Nizier-d'Azergues
- Location within France Location within Auvergne-Rhône-Alpes
- Coordinates: 46°05′18″N 4°28′00″E
- Country: France
- Region: Auvergne-Rhône-Alpes
- Department: Rhône
- Arrondissement: Villefranche-sur-Saône
- Canton: Thizy-les-Bourgs
- Intercommunality: CA de l'Ouest Rhodanien

Government
  - Mayor (2020–2026): Alain Dequevauviller
- Area^{1}: 24.23 km^{2} (9.36 sq mi)
- Elevation: 525 m (1,722 ft)
- Highest elevation: 903 m (2,963 ft)
- Lowest elevation: 393 m (1,289 ft)
- Population (2023): 774
  - Density: 31.9/km^{2} (82.7/sq mi)
- Time zone: UTC+01:00 (CET)
  - Summer (DST): UTC+02:00 (CEST)
- INSEE/Postal code: 69229 /69870
- ^{1} French Land Register data, which excludes lakes, ponds, glaciers > 1 km^{2} (0.386 sq mi or 247 acres) and river estuaries.

Saint-Nizier-d'Azergues is a commune in the Rhône department in eastern France.

== See also ==
- Communes of the Rhône department
