= Aigueperse, Rhône =

Aigueperse
- Commune
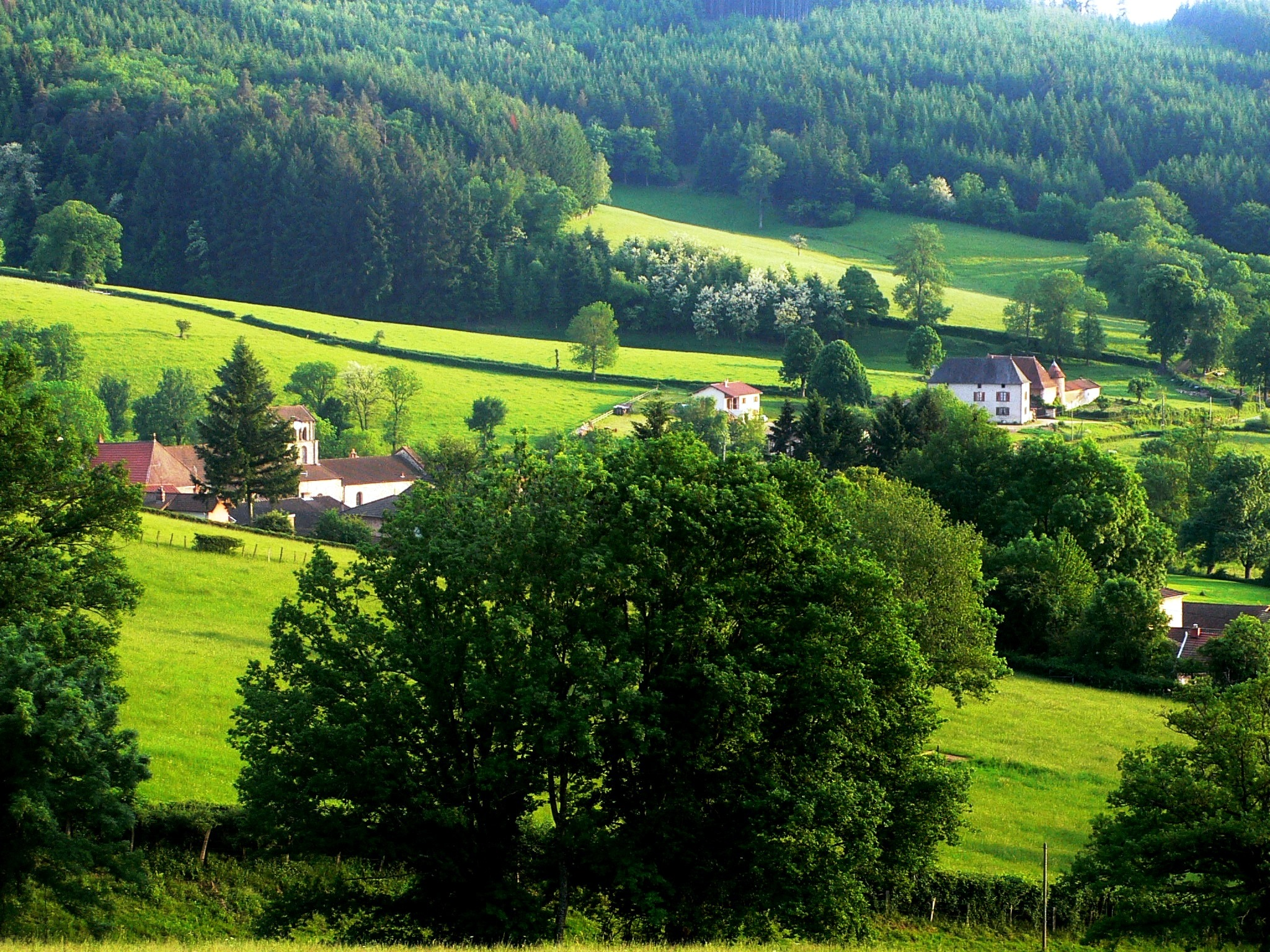
- A general view of Aigueperse

- Coat of arms
- Location of Aigueperse
- Location within France Location within Auvergne-Rhône-Alpes
- Coordinates: 46°17′00″N 4°26′00″E
- Country: France
- Region: Auvergne-Rhône-Alpes
- Department: Rhône
- Arrondissement: Villefranche-sur-Saône
- Canton: Thizy-les-Bourgs
- Intercommunality: Saône-Beaujolais

Government
  - Mayor (2021–2026): Jean-François Alexandre
- Area^{1}: 12.95 km^{2} (5.00 sq mi)
- Highest elevation: 610 m (2,000 ft)
- Lowest elevation: 403 m (1,322 ft)
- Population (2023): 235
  - Density: 18.1/km^{2} (47.0/sq mi)
- Time zone: UTC+01:00 (CET)
  - Summer (DST): UTC+02:00 (CEST)
- INSEE/Postal code: 69002 /69790
- ^{1} French Land Register data, which excludes lakes, ponds, glaciers > 1 km^{2} (0.386 sq mi or 247 acres) and river estuaries.

Aigueperse (French pronunciation: [ɛɡpɛʁs]) is a commune in the Rhône department in eastern France.

== Population ==
Historical population
Year	Pop.	±% p.a.
1968	388	—
1975	360	−1.06%
1982	267	−4.18%
1990	240	−1.32%
1999	232	−0.38%
2007	245	+0.68%
2012	246	+0.08%
2017	248	+0.16%
2023	235	−0.89%
Source: INSEE

== See also ==
Communes of the Rhône department
