= Amplepuis =

- Commune
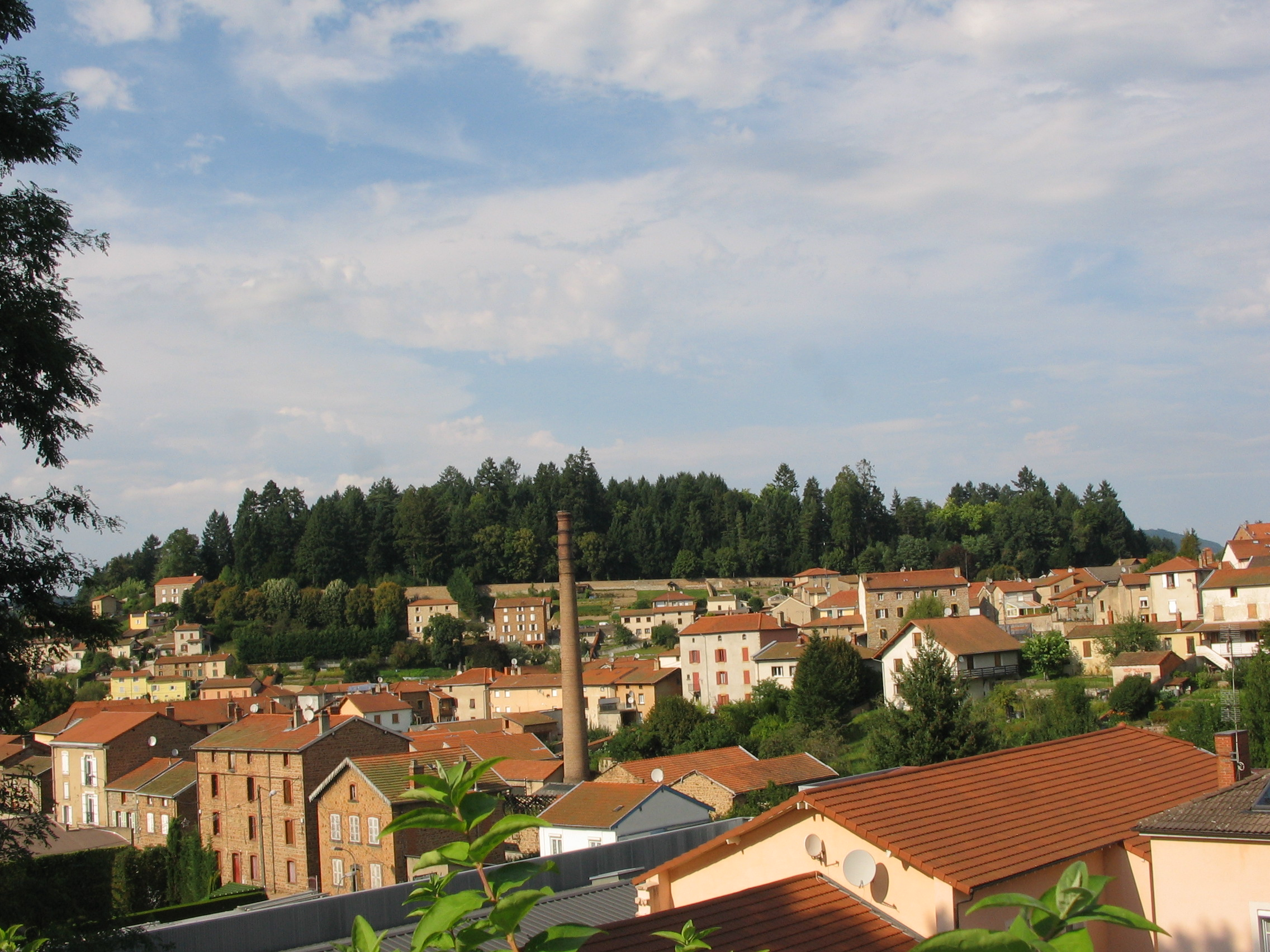
- A general view of Amplepuis

- Coat of arms
- Location of Amplepuis
- Location within France Location within Auvergne-Rhône-Alpes
- Coordinates: 45°58′24″N 4°19′52″E
- Country: France
- Region: Auvergne-Rhône-Alpes
- Department: Rhône
- Arrondissement: Villefranche-sur-Saône
- Canton: Thizy-les-Bourgs
- Intercommunality: CA de l'Ouest Rhodanien

Government
  - Mayor (2020–2026): René Pontet
- Area^{1}: 38.44 km^{2} (14.84 sq mi)
- Elevation: 425 m (1,394 ft)
- Highest elevation: 868 m (2,848 ft)
- Lowest elevation: 336 m (1,102 ft)
- Population (2023): 4,876
  - Density: 126.8/km^{2} (328.5/sq mi)
- Time zone: UTC+01:00 (CET)
  - Summer (DST): UTC+02:00 (CEST)
- INSEE/Postal code: 69006 /69550
- ^{1} French Land Register data, which excludes lakes, ponds, glaciers > 1 km^{2} (0.386 sq mi or 247 acres) and river estuaries.

Amplepuis (French pronunciation: [ɑ̃pləpɥi]) is a commune in the Rhône department in eastern France.

== Demography ==
Historical population
Year	Pop.	±% p.a.
1968	5,344	—
1975	5,340	−0.01%
1982	5,055	−0.78%
1990	4,839	−0.54%
1999	4,948	+0.25%
2007	5,070	+0.30%
2012	5,090	+0.08%
2017	4,976	−0.45%
2023	4,876	−0.34%
Source: INSEE

== See also ==
Communes of the Rhône department
