= Poule-les-Écharmeaux =

- Commune
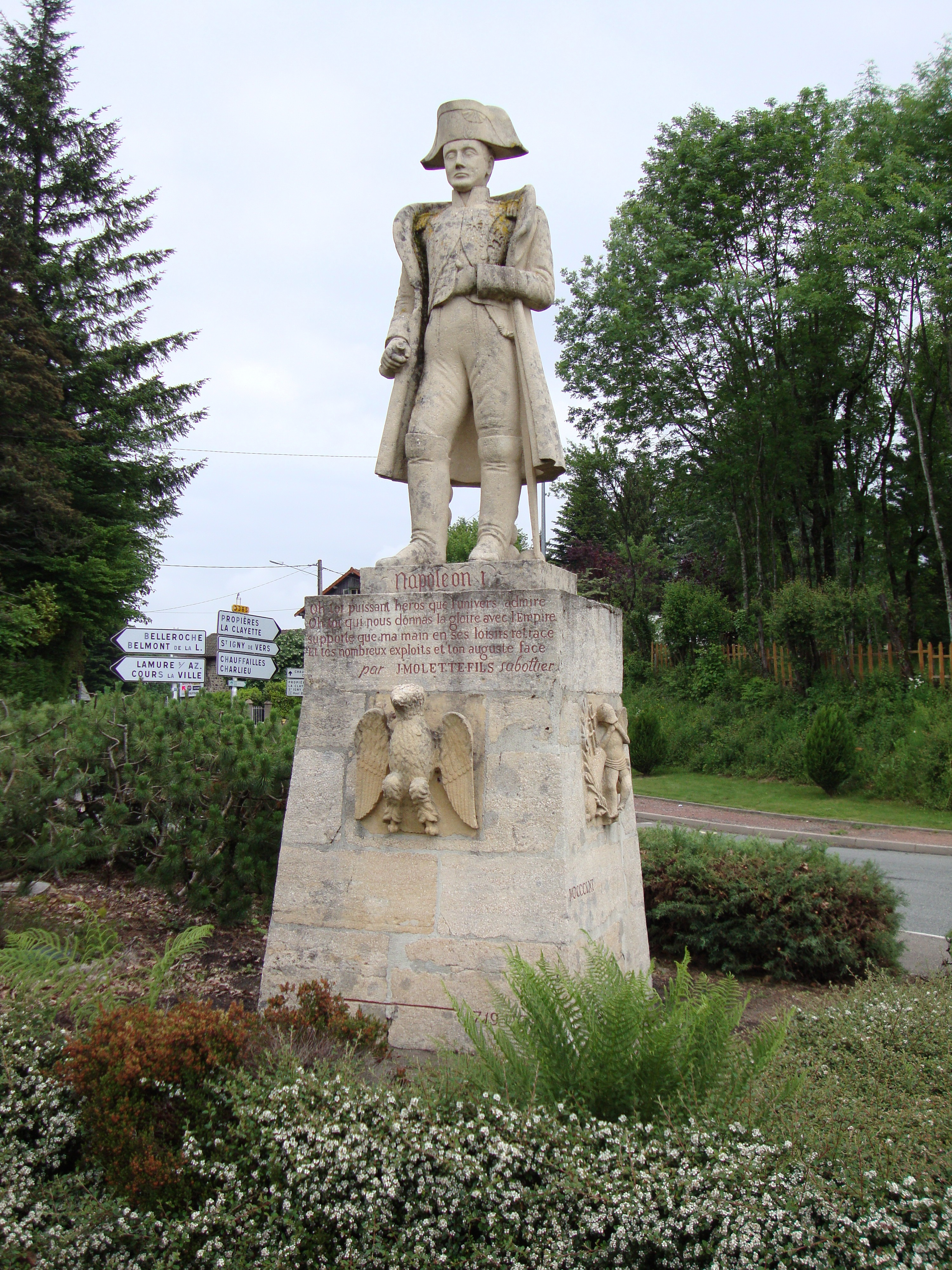
- A statue of Napoléon I at the Col des Écharmeaux

- Coat of arms
- Location of Poule-les-Écharmeaux
- Location within France Location within Auvergne-Rhône-Alpes
- Coordinates: 46°08′59″N 4°27′29″E
- Country: France
- Region: Auvergne-Rhône-Alpes
- Department: Rhône
- Arrondissement: Villefranche-sur-Saône
- Canton: Thizy-les-Bourgs
- Intercommunality: CA de l'Ouest Rhodanien

Government
  - Mayor (2020–2026): Aymeric Champale
- Area^{1}: 31.23 km^{2} (12.06 sq mi)
- Elevation: 675 m (2,215 ft)
- Highest elevation: 962 m (3,156 ft)
- Lowest elevation: 450 m (1,480 ft)
- Population (2023): 1,023
  - Density: 32.76/km^{2} (84.84/sq mi)
- Time zone: UTC+01:00 (CET)
  - Summer (DST): UTC+02:00 (CEST)
- INSEE/Postal code: 69160 /69870
- ^{1} French Land Register data, which excludes lakes, ponds, glaciers > 1 km^{2} (0.386 sq mi or 247 acres) and river estuaries.

Poule-les-Écharmeaux (French pronunciation: [pul le.z‿eʃaʁmo]) is a commune in the Rhône department in eastern France.

== See also ==
- Communes of the Rhône department
