= Meaux-la-Montagne =

- Commune
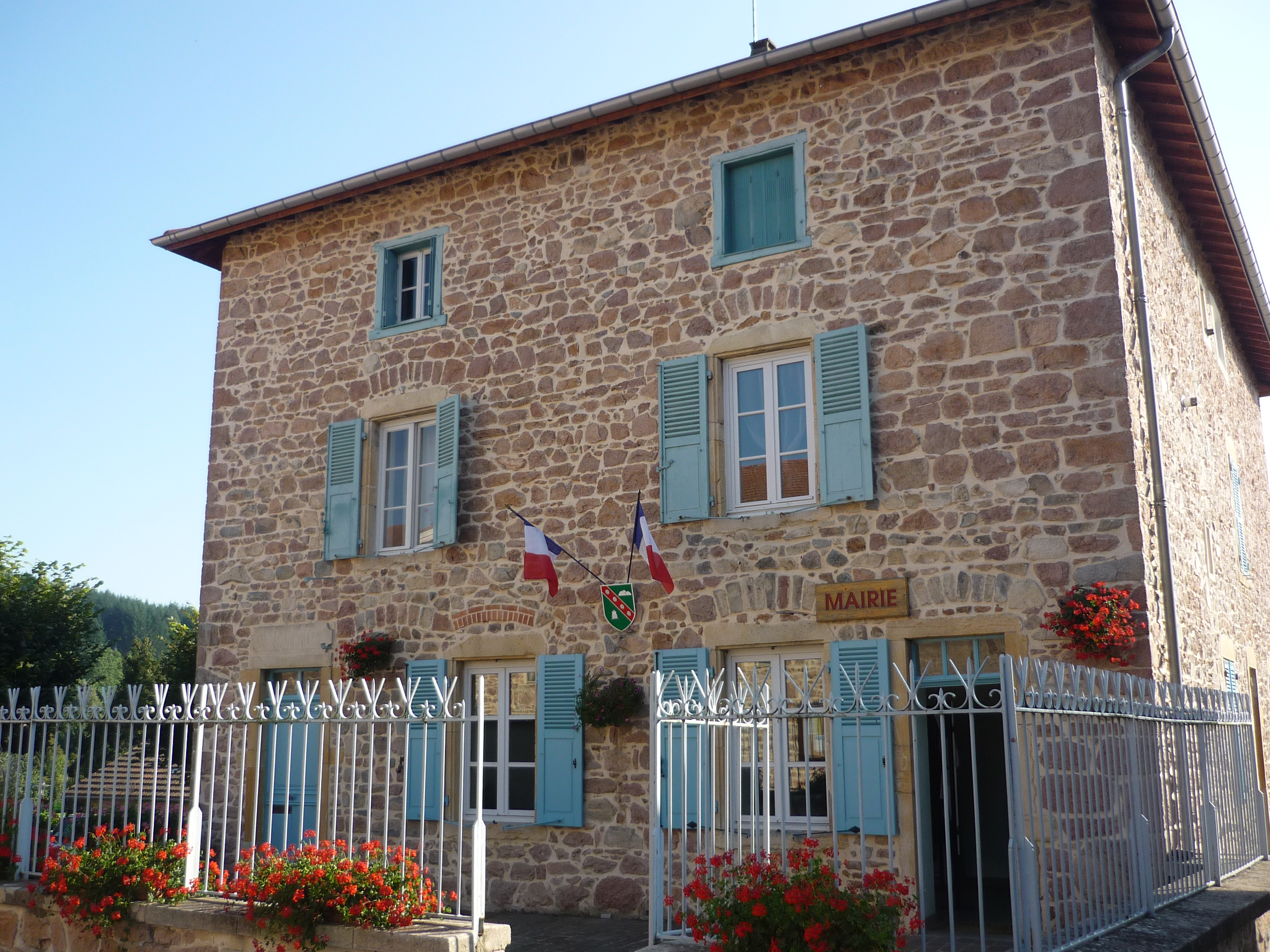
- The town hall in Meaux-la-Montagne

- Coat of arms
- Location of Meaux-la-Montagne
- Location within France Location within Auvergne-Rhône-Alpes
- Coordinates: 46°02′45″N 4°25′10″E
- Country: France
- Region: Auvergne-Rhône-Alpes
- Department: Rhône
- Arrondissement: Villefranche-sur-Saône
- Canton: Thizy-les-Bourgs
- Intercommunality: CA de l'Ouest Rhodanien

Government
  - Mayor (2020–2026): Véronique Murat
- Area^{1}: 9.19 km^{2} (3.55 sq mi)
- Elevation: 650 m (2,130 ft)
- Highest elevation: 863 m (2,831 ft)
- Lowest elevation: 480 m (1,570 ft)
- Population (2023): 223
  - Density: 24.3/km^{2} (62.8/sq mi)
- Time zone: UTC+01:00 (CET)
  - Summer (DST): UTC+02:00 (CEST)
- INSEE/Postal code: 69130 /69550
- ^{1} French Land Register data, which excludes lakes, ponds, glaciers > 1 km^{2} (0.386 sq mi or 247 acres) and river estuaries.

Meaux-la-Montagne (French pronunciation: [mo la mɔ̃taɲ]) is a commune in the Rhône department in eastern France.

== Demography ==
Historical population
Year	Pop.	±% p.a.
1968	152	—
1975	148	−0.38%
1982	153	+0.48%
1990	166	+1.02%
1999	163	−0.20%
2007	206	+2.97%
2012	246	+3.61%
2017	237	−0.74%
2023	223	−1.01%
Source: INSEE

== See also ==
- Official website of Meaux-la-Montagne.
- Communes of the Rhône department
