= Cublize =

- Commune
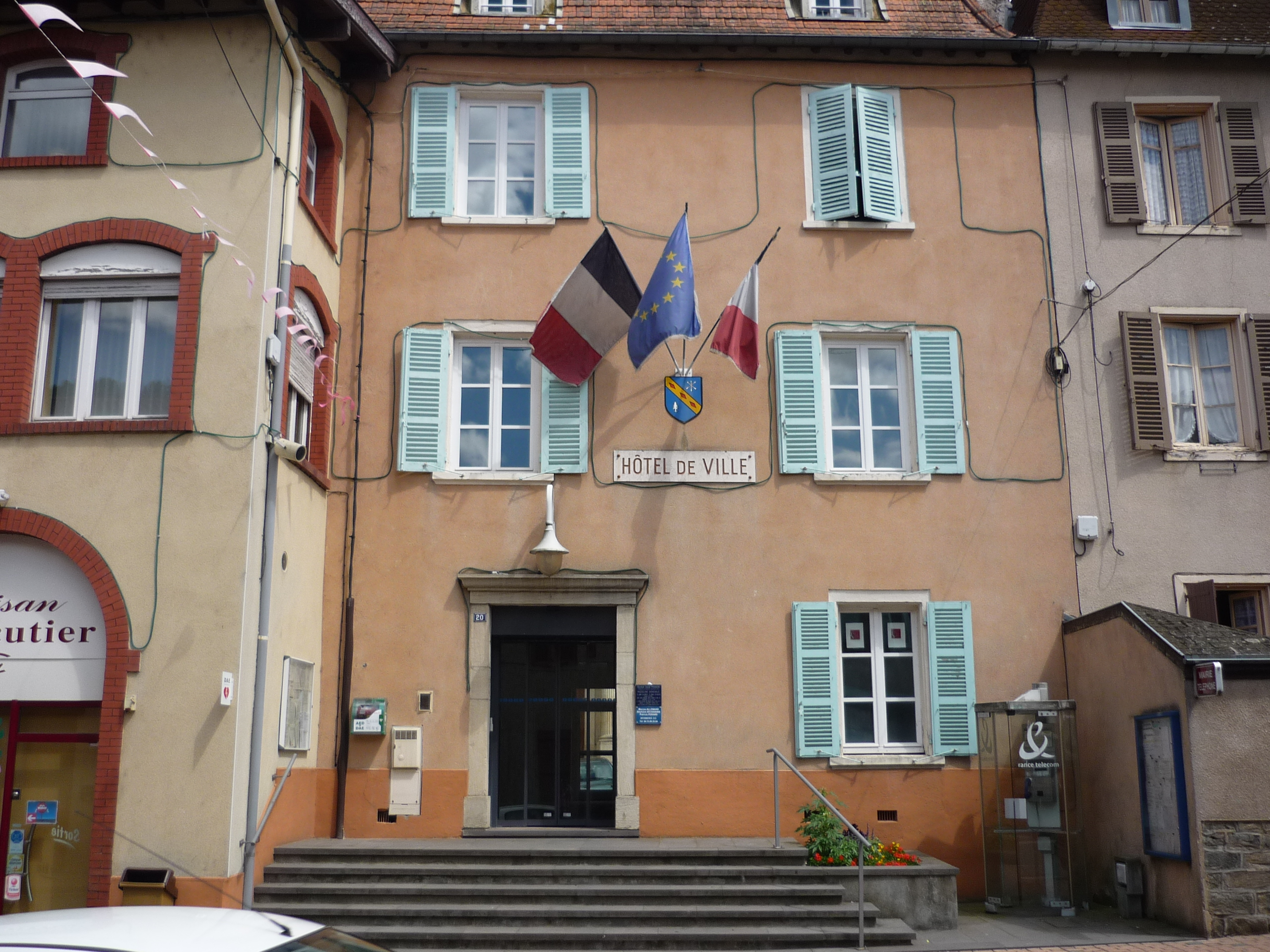
- Town hall

- Coat of arms
- Location of Cublize
- Location within France Location within Auvergne-Rhône-Alpes
- Coordinates: 46°01′08″N 4°22′41″E
- Country: France
- Region: Auvergne-Rhône-Alpes
- Department: Rhône
- Arrondissement: Villefranche-sur-Saône
- Canton: Thizy-les-Bourgs
- Intercommunality: CA de l'Ouest Rhodanien

Government
  - Mayor (2020–2026): Olivier Maire
- Area^{1}: 15.56 km^{2} (6.01 sq mi)
- Elevation: 404 m (1,325 ft)
- Highest elevation: 805 m (2,641 ft)
- Lowest elevation: 430 m (1,410 ft)
- Population (2023): 1,360
  - Density: 87.4/km^{2} (226/sq mi)
- Time zone: UTC+01:00 (CET)
  - Summer (DST): UTC+02:00 (CEST)
- INSEE/Postal code: 69070 /69550
- ^{1} French Land Register data, which excludes lakes, ponds, glaciers > 1 km^{2} (0.386 sq mi or 247 acres) and river estuaries.

Cublize (French pronunciation: [kybliz]) is a commune in the Rhône department in eastern France.

== Population ==
In 2019, the municipality had 1,266 inhabitants.

== See also ==
- Communes of the Rhône department
