= Avena (disambiguation) =

Avena is a genus of grass plants collectively known as the oats.

Avena may also refer to:

== Places ==
- Avena, formerly an independent village, now a frazione (municipal subdivision) of Papasidero, a comune in southern Italy
- Avena, Spanish Abena, an Aragonese village incorporated into the municipality of Jaca in northern Aragon, Spain
- Avena, Illinois, an unincorporated community
- Avena Township, Fayette County, Illinois, a township
- Avena, a populated place in San Joaquin County, California
- Avenas, a former commune of the Rhône department in eastern France
- Avène (Languedocien: Avèna), commune in the Hérault department in southern France

== People ==
- Cristina D'Avena (1964-), Italian singer and actress
- Blas Avena (1983–2016), American professional mixed martial artist

== Other uses ==
- Avena (drink), a beverage prepared with oatmeal and milk
- Avenà, a red Italian wine grape

== See also ==
- Wild Oats (disambiguation)
