= Avena, Illinois =

- Unincorporated community
- Location within Illinois Location within the United States
- Coordinates: 39°00′27″N 88°55′40″W
- Country: United States
- State: Illinois
- County: Fayette
- Townships: Avena, Sefton
- Elevation: 584 ft (178 m)
- Time zone: UTC-6 (Central (CST))
  - Summer (DST): UTC-5 (CDT)
- Area code: 618
- GNIS feature ID: 422424

Avena is an unincorporated community in Avena and Sefton Townships, Fayette County, Illinois, United States. Avena is located on a CSX Transportation line 4.3 miles (6.9 km) west-southwest of St. Elmo.
