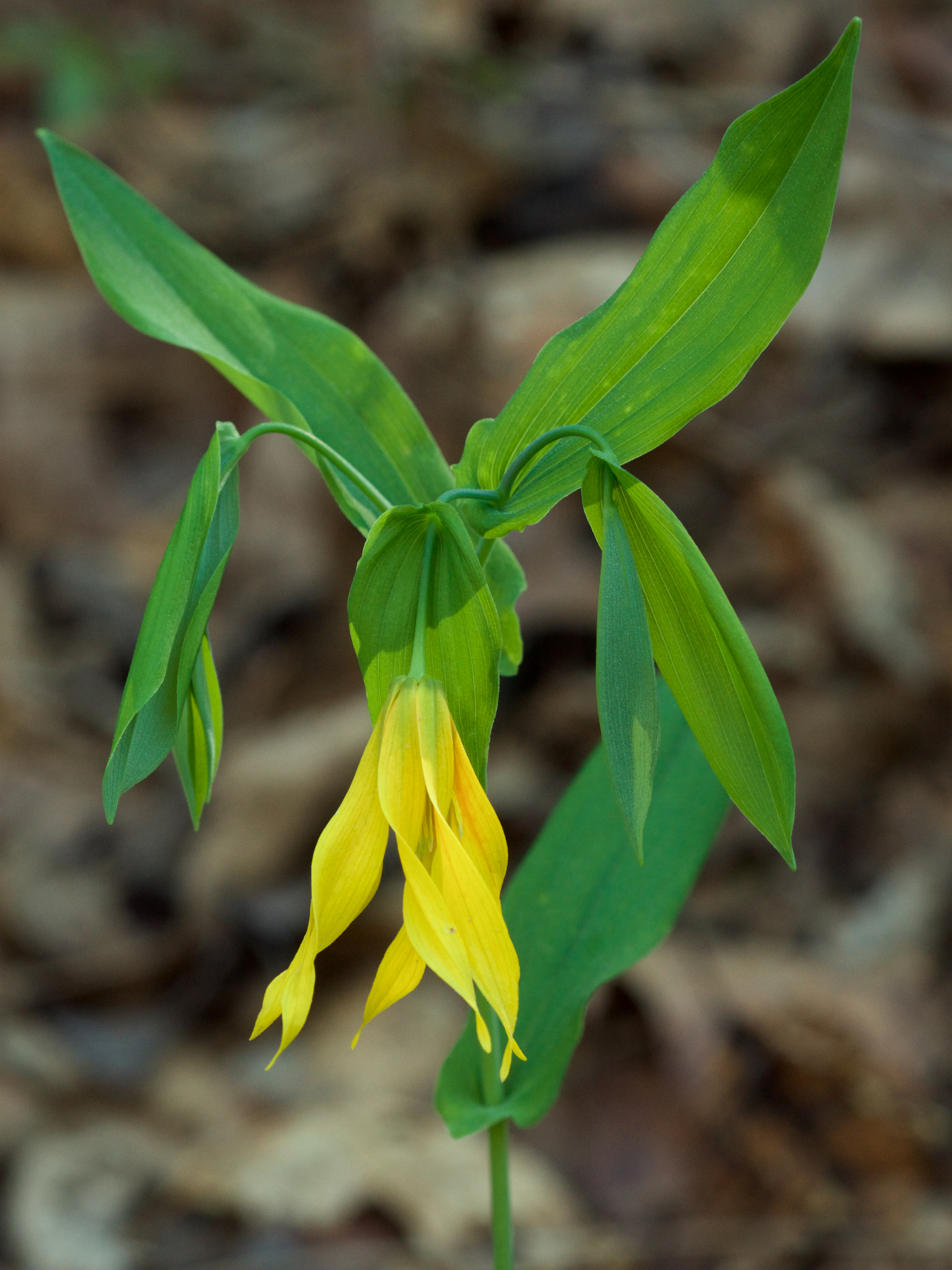

Conservation status
- Secure (NatureServe)

Scientific classification
- Kingdom: Plantae
- Clade: Tracheophytes
- Clade: Angiosperms
- Clade: Monocots
- Order: Liliales
- Family: Colchicaceae
- Genus: Uvularia
- Species: U. grandiflora

Binomial name
- Uvularia grandiflora Sm.

= Uvularia grandiflora =

Species of flowering plant

Uvularia grandiflora, the large-flowered bellwort or merrybells, is a species of flowering plant in the family Colchicaceae, native to eastern and central North America.

== Description ==
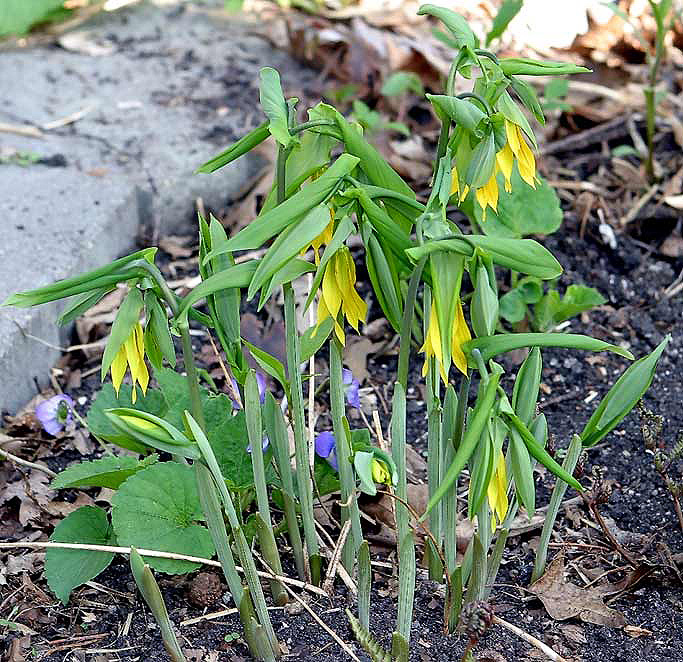
Blooming plants

Growing to 75 cm (30 in) tall by 30 cm (12 in) broad, it is a rhizomatous herbaceous perennial with pendent leaves which are hairy on the undersides. It blooms in mid- to late spring, producing large yellow, solitary or paired, bell-shaped, pendent flowers. The top parts of the plant tend to bend downward due to the weight of the leaves and flowers. The light green stems are round, glabrous, and glaucous and the leaves are perfoliate since the stem appears to come through the leaves at the base. In late summer three capsuled ovaries split open releasing the seeds.

The Latin specific epithet grandiflora means "large flowered".

This plant differs from Uvularia sessilifolia in that the leaves of the latter grow from the stem and its flowers are smaller. U. grandiflora also differs from Uvularia perfoliata, which occurs in eastern North America. The latter has similar large perfoliate leaves, but the flowers have orange-colored bumps on the petals.

== Range ==
The native range of Uvularia grandiflora extends from the Appalachians west to the Dakotas, Kansas and Oklahoma, from Louisiana and Georgia in the South to Manitoba, Ontario and Quebec in Canada. So, it is widespread across the eastern mountains, the Great Lakes and the Mississippi Valley. There are also isolated populations along Chesapeake Bay in Maryland.

== Ecology ==
Uvularia grandiflora is a woodland species found in open shade in rich moist woods with calcareous to neutral soils.

Bumblebees, mason bees, halictid bees, and andrenid bees feed from the nectar and collect pollen from the flowers. Deer love to eat these plants. The seeds have attached food bodies called (elaiosome) that are attractive to ants, which collect and redistribute the seeds.

== Conservation status in the United States ==
The plant is listed as endangered in New Hampshire and Connecticut.

== Ethnobotany ==
The Menominee use this plant for swellings. The Ojibwa are documented to use the root for pain in the solar plexus, which may refer to pleurisy. The Potawatomi mix an infusion of the root mixed with lard and use it as salve to massage sore muscles and tendons.

== Cultivation ==
In cultivation in the UK Uvularia grandiflora has gained the Royal Horticultural Society's Award of Garden Merit. There exists a cultivar 'Pallida' with paler coloured flowers.
