= Brownstown, Illinois =

- Village
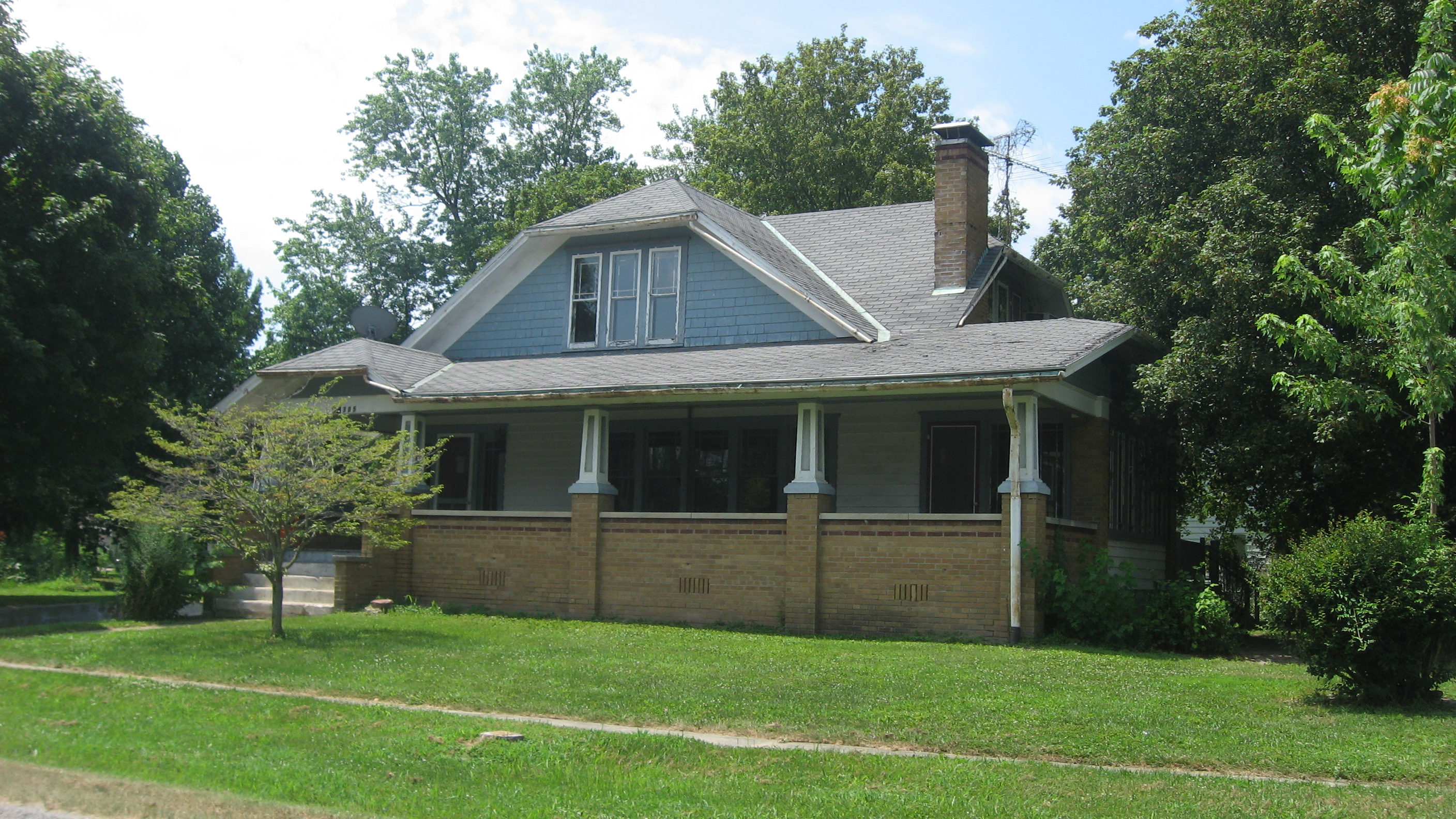
- The Floyd and Glenora Dycus House, a historic site in the village

- Location of Brownstown in Fayette County, Illinois.
- Coordinates: 38°59′49″N 88°57′10″W
- Country: United States
- State: Illinois
- County: Fayette
- Townships: Otego, Sefton

Area
  - Total: 0.76 sq mi (1.97 km^{2})
  - Land: 0.76 sq mi (1.97 km^{2})
  - Water: 0 sq mi (0.00 km^{2})
- Elevation: 594 ft (181 m)

Population (2020)
  - Total: 690
  - Density: 907.4/sq mi (350.36/km^{2})
- Time zone: UTC-6 (CST)
  - Summer (DST): UTC-5 (CDT)
- Zip code: 62418
- Area code: 618
- FIPS code: 17-08992
- GNIS feature ID: 2397473
- Website: www.villageofbrownstown.com

Brownstown is a village in Fayette County, Illinois, United States. The population was 690 at the 2020 census, down from 759 at the 2010 census.

== Geography ==
U.S. Route 40 passes through the south side of the village, leading east 6 miles (10 km) to St. Elmo and west 8 miles (13 km) to Vandalia, the Fayette County seat. Interstate 70 passes just south of Brownstown, with the closest exit 3 miles (5 km) west at US 40.

According to the 2021 census gazetteer files, Brownstown has a total area of 0.76 square miles (1.97 km^{2}), all land.

== Demographics ==
Historical population
Census	Pop.	Note	%±
1880	121		—
1910	415		—
1920	518		24.8%
1930	464		−10.4%
1940	825		77.8%
1950	649		−21.3%
1960	659		1.5%
1970	689		4.6%
1980	708		2.8%
1990	668		−5.6%
2000	705		5.5%
2010	759		7.7%
2020	690		−9.1%
U.S. Decennial Census

As of the 2020 census there were 690 people, 313 households, and 200 families residing in the village. The population density was 907.89 inhabitants per square mile (350.54/km^{2}). There were 299 housing units at an average density of 393.42 per square mile (151.90/km^{2}). The racial makeup of the village was 94.06% White, 1.01% African American, 0.58% Native American, 0.00% Asian, 0.00% Pacific Islander, 0.43% from other races, and 3.91% from two or more races. Hispanic or Latino of any race were 1.30% of the population.

There were 313 households, out of which 35.5% had children under the age of 18 living with them, 39.62% were married couples living together, 8.63% had a female householder with no husband present, and 36.10% were non-families. 31.63% of all households were made up of individuals, and 17.25% had someone living alone who was 65 years of age or older. The average household size was 3.37 and the average family size was 2.68.

The village's age distribution consisted of 24.2% under the age of 18, 11.1% from 18 to 24, 31.6% from 25 to 44, 15.9% from 45 to 64, and 17.4% who were 65 years of age or older. The median age was 33.9 years. For every 100 females, there were 96.5 males. For every 100 females age 18 and over, there were 74.2 males.

The median income for a household in the village was $47,171, and the median income for a family was $52,250. Males had a median income of $41,023 versus $15,813 for females. The per capita income for the village was $28,772. About 16.0% of families and 26.1% of the population were below the poverty line, including 36.9% of those under age 18 and 4.1% of those age 65 or over.

== Education ==
Brownstown High School

Brownstown Community Unit School District 201 serves Brownstown and the surrounding area. It is located at 421 South College Avenue, Brownstown, Illinois. The annual statement in June 2025 reported the district served an area of 94 sq mi (243.5 km^{2}). The district employed 39 full-time certificated and 25 full-time and 1 part-time non-certificated persons.

The district has three schools: Brownstown Elementary serving pre-kindergarten to 6th grade, Brownstown Junior High serving 7th and 8th grade, and Brownstown High serving 9th to 12th grade. All schools earned a score of Commendable which is the level below Exemplary but above Targeted. The schools have a 96.2% graduation rate. Average spending per student is $11,000.

== Points of interest ==
Brownstown is host to the annual Fayette County Fair, held each summer in mid-July. The fair includes livestock shows, fine arts and culinary exhibits, tractor pulls, stock car races, a talent show, and a queen pageant.
