= Monsols =

- Part of Deux-Grosnes
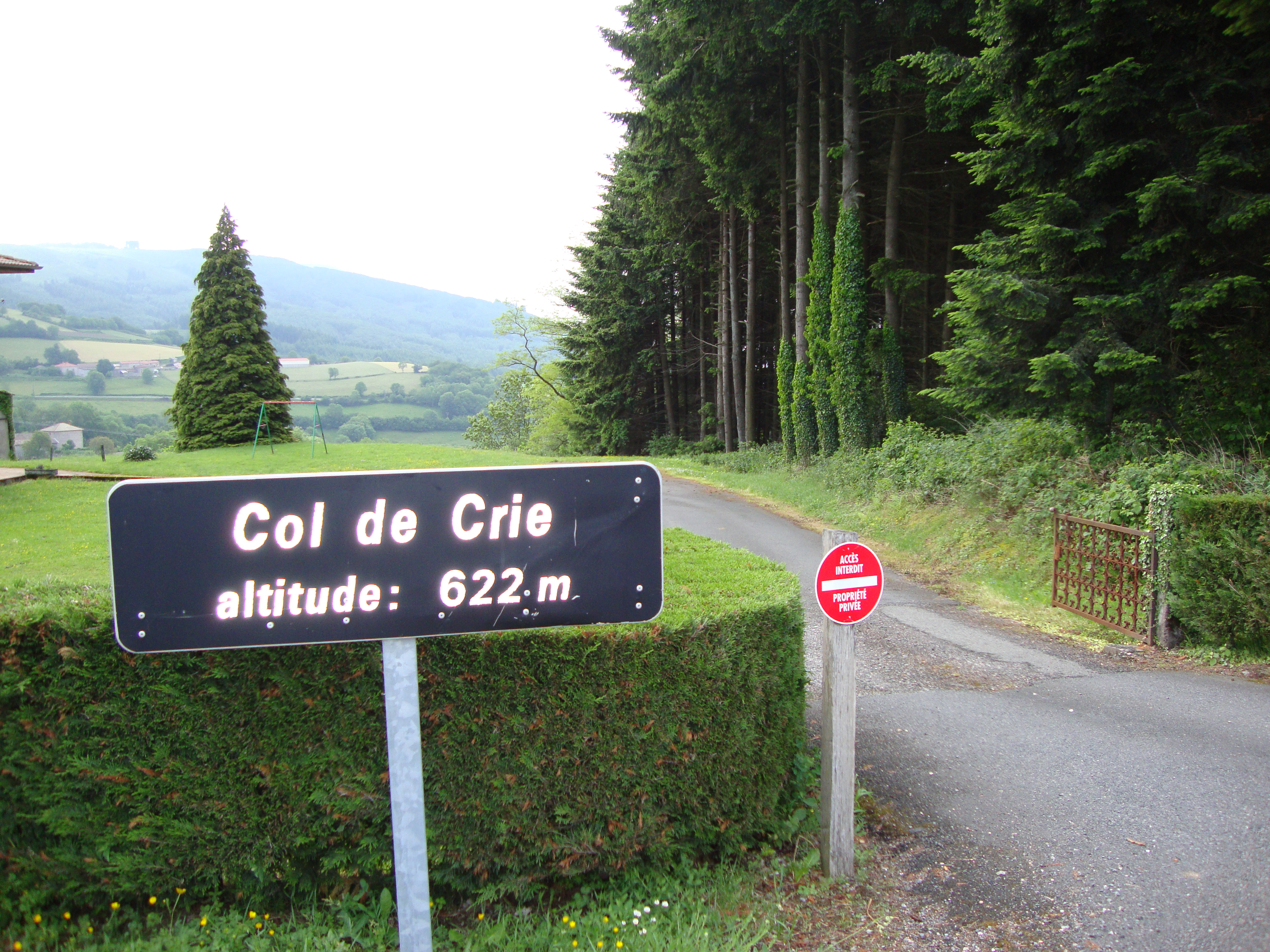
- The Col de Crie, road sign and landscape

- Coat of arms
- Location of Monsols
- Location within France Location within Auvergne-Rhône-Alpes
- Coordinates: 46°13′10″N 4°31′12″E
- Country: France
- Region: Auvergne-Rhône-Alpes
- Department: Rhône
- Arrondissement: Villefranche-sur-Saône
- Canton: Thizy-les-Bourgs
- Commune: Deux-Grosnes
- Area^{1}: 19.82 km^{2} (7.65 sq mi)
- Elevation: 535 m (1,755 ft)
- Highest elevation: 1,008 m (3,307 ft)
- Lowest elevation: 430 m (1,410 ft)
- Population (2022): 921
  - Density: 46.5/km^{2} (120/sq mi)
- Time zone: UTC+01:00 (CET)
  - Summer (DST): UTC+02:00 (CEST)
- Postal code: 69860
- ^{1} French Land Register data, which excludes lakes, ponds, glaciers > 1 km^{2} (0.386 sq mi or 247 acres) and river estuaries.

Monsols (French pronunciation: [mɔ̃sɔl]) is a former commune in the Rhône department in eastern France. On 1 January 2019, it was merged into the new commune Deux-Grosnes.

== See also ==
- Communes of the Rhône department
