= Ouroux =

- Part of Deux-Grosnes
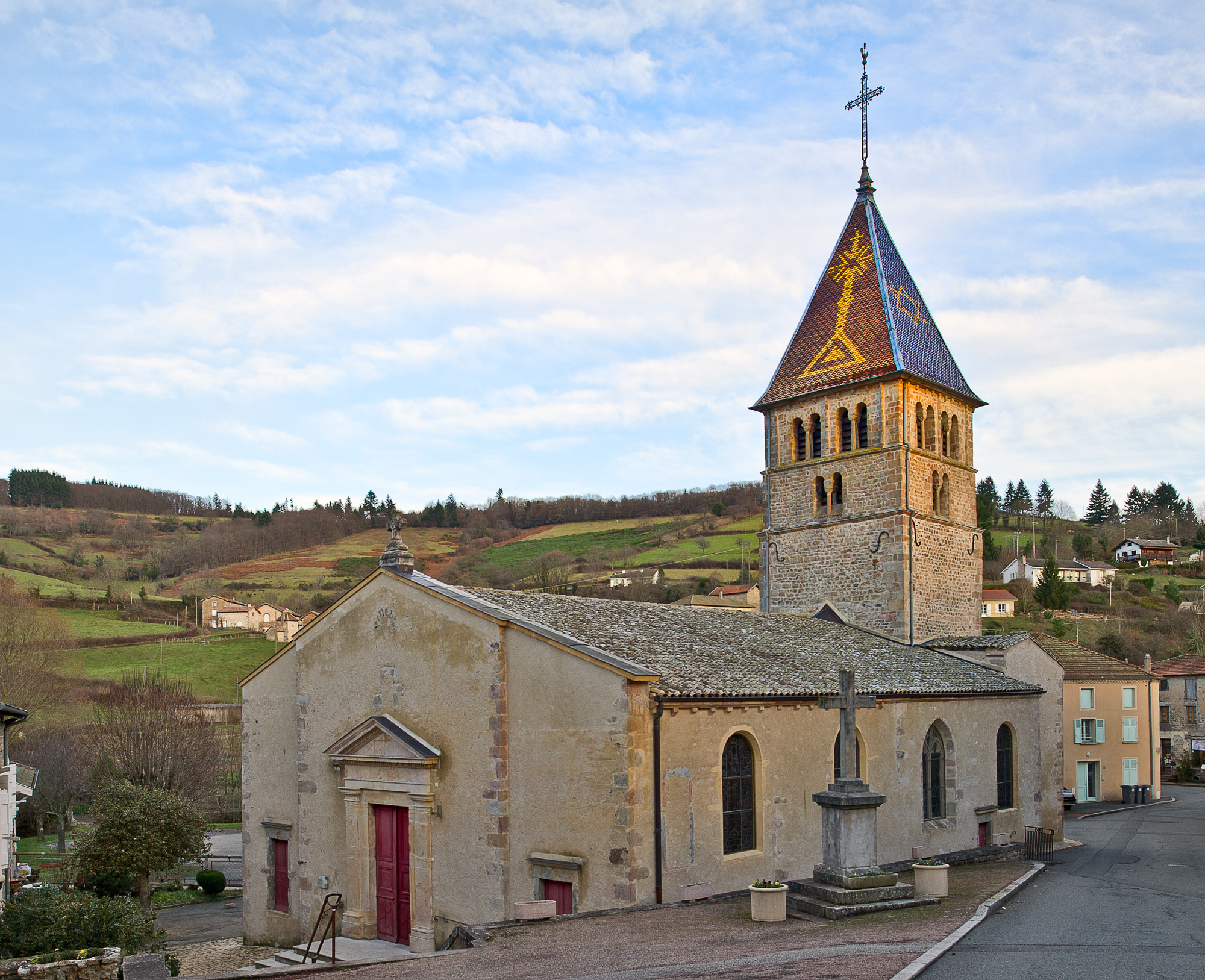
- The church in Ouroux
- Location of Ouroux
- Location within France Location within Auvergne-Rhône-Alpes
- Coordinates: 46°13′51″N 4°35′40″E
- Country: France
- Region: Auvergne-Rhône-Alpes
- Department: Rhône
- Arrondissement: Villefranche-sur-Saône
- Canton: Thizy-les-Bourgs
- Commune: Deux-Grosnes
- Area^{1}: 21.06 km^{2} (8.13 sq mi)
- Elevation: 450 m (1,480 ft)
- Highest elevation: 806 m (2,644 ft)
- Lowest elevation: 406 m (1,332 ft)
- Population (2022): 336
  - Density: 16.0/km^{2} (41.3/sq mi)
- Time zone: UTC+01:00 (CET)
  - Summer (DST): UTC+02:00 (CEST)
- Postal code: 69860
- ^{1} French Land Register data, which excludes lakes, ponds, glaciers > 1 km^{2} (0.386 sq mi or 247 acres) and river estuaries.

Ouroux (French pronunciation: [uʁu]) is a former commune in the Rhône department in eastern France. On 1 January 2019, it was merged into the new commune Deux-Grosnes.

== See also ==
- Communes of the Rhône department
