= Saint-Jacques-des-Arrêts =

- Part of Deux-Grosnes
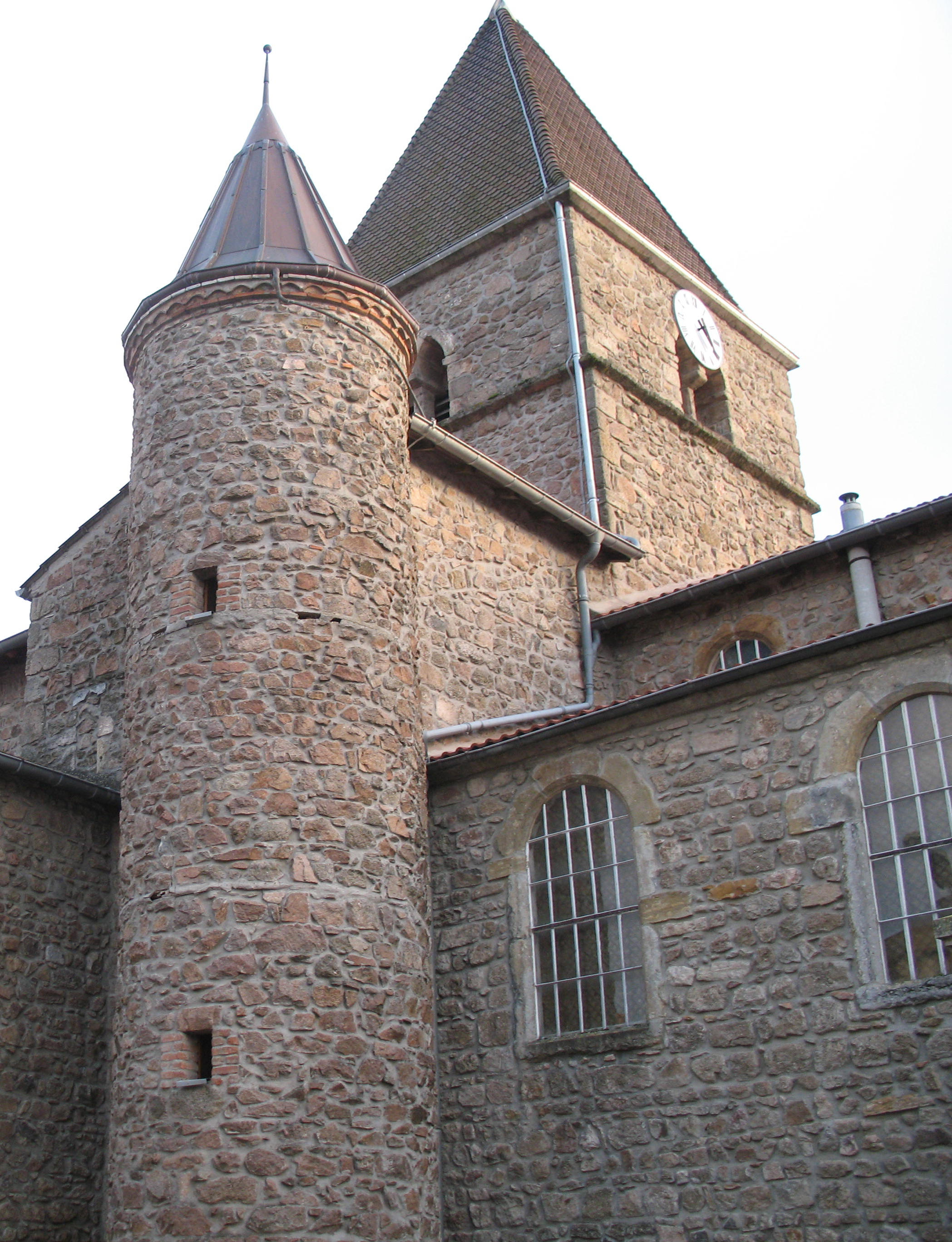
- Location of Saint-Jacques-des-Arrêts
- Location within France Location within Auvergne-Rhône-Alpes
- Coordinates: 46°15′24″N 4°35′54″E
- Country: France
- Region: Auvergne-Rhône-Alpes
- Department: Rhône
- Arrondissement: Villefranche-sur-Saône
- Canton: Thizy-les-Bourgs
- Commune: Deux-Grosnes
- Area^{1}: 7.47 km^{2} (2.88 sq mi)
- Elevation: 500 m (1,600 ft)
- Highest elevation: 761 m (2,497 ft)
- Lowest elevation: 370 m (1,210 ft)
- Population (2022): 119
  - Density: 15.9/km^{2} (41.3/sq mi)
- Time zone: UTC+01:00 (CET)
  - Summer (DST): UTC+02:00 (CEST)
- Postal code: 69860
- ^{1} French Land Register data, which excludes lakes, ponds, glaciers > 1 km^{2} (0.386 sq mi or 247 acres) and river estuaries.

Saint-Jacques-des-Arrêts (French pronunciation: [sɛ̃ ʒak de.z‿aʁɛ]) is a former commune in the Rhône department in eastern France. On 1 January 2019, it was merged into the new commune Deux-Grosnes.

== See also ==
- Communes of the Rhône department
