= Deux-Grosnes =

- Commune
- Location of Deux-Grosnes
- Location within France Location within Auvergne-Rhône-Alpes
- Coordinates: 46°13′10″N 4°31′12″E
- Country: France
- Region: Auvergne-Rhône-Alpes
- Department: Rhône
- Arrondissement: Villefranche-sur-Saône
- Canton: Thizy-les-Bourgs
- Intercommunality: Saône-Beaujolais

Government
  - Mayor (2020–2026): René Thévenon
- Area^{1}: 83.60 km^{2} (32.28 sq mi)
- Highest elevation: 1,008 m (3,307 ft)
- Lowest elevation: 330 m (1,080 ft)
- Population (2023): 1,946
  - Density: 23.28/km^{2} (60.29/sq mi)
- Time zone: UTC+01:00 (CET)
  - Summer (DST): UTC+02:00 (CEST)
- INSEE/Postal code: 69135 /69860
- ^{1} French Land Register data, which excludes lakes, ponds, glaciers > 1 km^{2} (0.386 sq mi or 247 acres) and river estuaries.

Deux-Grosnes (French pronunciation: [dø ɡʁon]) is a commune in the Rhône department in eastern France. It was established on 1 January 2019 by merger of the former communes of Monsols (the seat), Avenas, Ouroux, Saint-Christophe, Saint-Jacques-des-Arrêts, Saint-Mamert and Trades.

== See also ==
- Communes of the Rhône department
