= Wild Oats =

Wild Oats or wild oat may refer to:

- Avena, a genus of grasses collectively known as the oats
  - Avena fatua, common wild oat
  - Avena sterilis, wild oat or wild red oat
- Chasmanthium latifolium or wild oats, a grass
- Uvularia sessilifolia or wild oats, a bellwort
- Wild Oats (TV series), a 1994 sitcom
- Wild Oats Markets, a natural foods and farmers' market chain of stores in North America
- Wild Oats XI, a maxi yacht
- Wild Oats (1919 film), a 1919 American sex hygiene film
- Wild Oats (film), a 2016 American film starring Shirley MacLaine and Jessica Lange
- Wild Oats (play), a 1791 comic play by John O'Keeffe, later rewritten and set in the American West by James McLure
