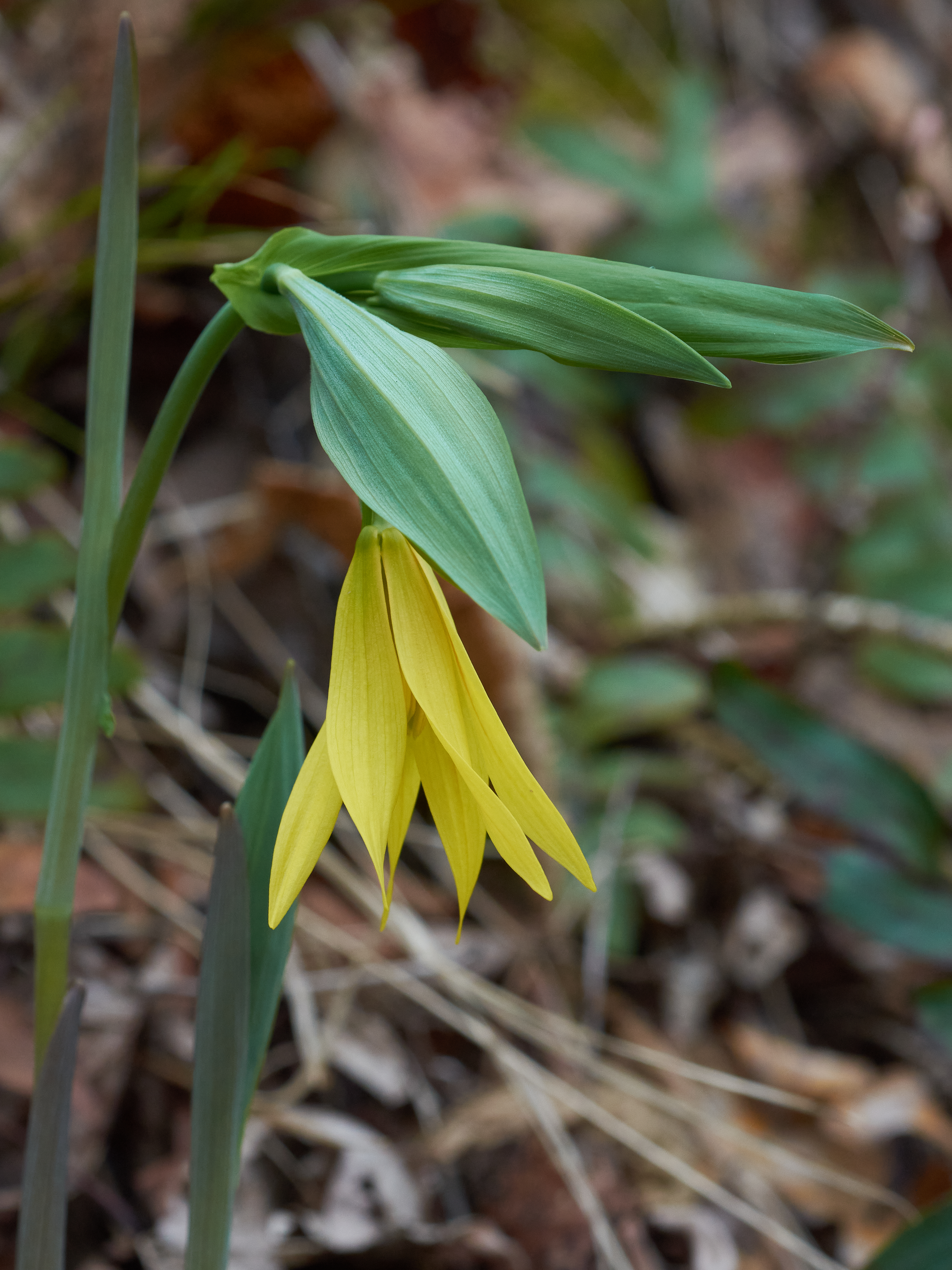
- Uvularia grandiflora

Scientific classification
- Kingdom: Plantae
- Clade: Tracheophytes
- Clade: Angiosperms
- Clade: Monocots
- Order: Liliales
- Family: Colchicaceae
- Genus: Uvularia; L.

Type species
- Uvularia perfoliata L.

Synonyms
- Uffenbachia Heist. ex Fabr.; Oakesia S.Watson 1879, illegitimate homonym, not Tuck. 1842 (syn of Corema in Ericaceae); Oakesiella Small

= Uvularia =

Genus of flowering plants

Uvularia is a genus of flowering plants in the family Colchicaceae, which is closely related to the lily family (Liliaceae). They are commonly called bellworts, bellflowers, or merrybells. The genus name is derived from the Latin ūvula meaning "little grape", likely because of the way the flowers hang downward. For the same reason Uvularia may also refer to the similarly derived palatine uvula, which hangs down from the soft palate in the mouth. The plants are often found growing on wooded slopes or in ravines and they spread by stolons, or stoloniferous rhizomes. The plants are usually 45–60 cm (18–24 in) in height and bear one or two flowers per stem in April and May, that hang downward from the axils of the leaves.

== Species ==
There are five species of Uvularia. All are exclusively native (endemic) to North America. They grow from northern Florida to Nova Scotia west to Manitoba and south to Texas.

Uvularia floridana Chapm. – Florida bellwort - FL GA SC AL MS
Uvularia grandiflora Sm. – large-flowered bellwort - Ontario, Québec, E + C United States
Uvularia perfoliata L. – perfoliate bellwort - Ontario, E + SC United States
Uvularia puberula Michx. – mountain bellwort - EC United States
Uvularia sessilifolia L. – sessile bellwort - E Canada, NE + SE United States, Great Lakes, Mississippi Valley

== Description ==
Uvularia species are herbaceous perennials with erect, simple or twice branched stems. Leaves alternate, sessile or perfoliate. Single or sometimes paired flowers hang downward from the top of the stems appearing axillary but are in fact terminal. They bloom in spring with bell shaped flowers composed of long tepals. Fruits are three lobed, greenish to yellowish brown in color, producing 1 to 3 roundish seeds per locule.

== Cultivation ==
These unobtrusive woodland plants are used in woodland and shade gardens.
