= Floyd and Glenora Dycus House =

Historic house in Illinois, United States

- U.S. National Register of Historic Places
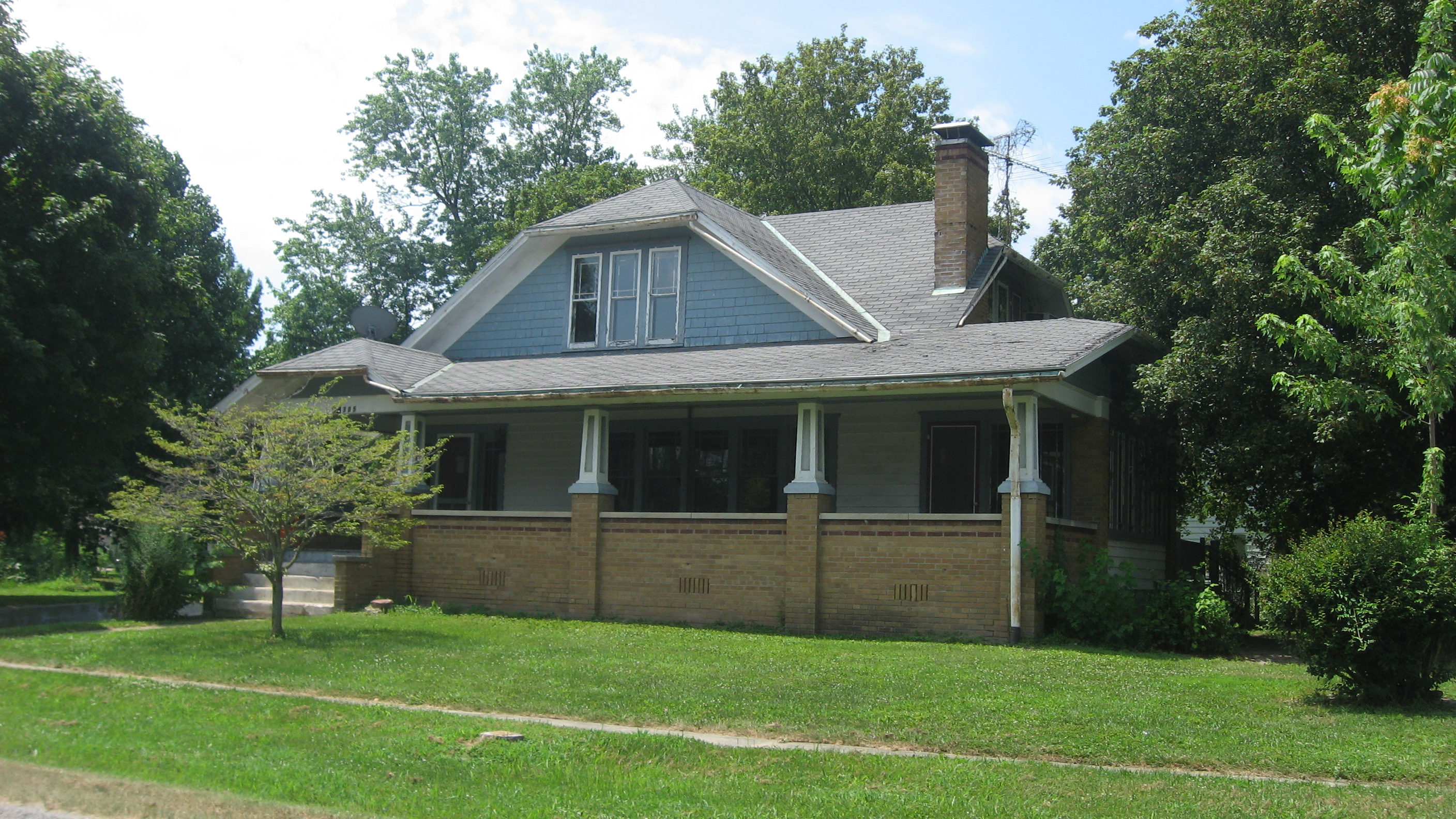
- Front of the house

- Location within Illinois Location within the United States
- Location: 305 S. Second St., Brownstown, Illinois
- Coordinates: 38°59′41″N 88°57′9″W
- Area: 0.4 acres (0.16 ha)
- Built: 1926
- Built by: Andrew and Charles Reeter
- NRHP reference No.: 01000179
- Added to NRHP: March 2, 2001

The Floyd and Glenora Dycus House is a historic house located at 305 S. Second St. in Brownstown, Illinois. The house was built in 1926 for Floyd and Glenora Dycus. Floyd Dycus was a prominent businessman in Brownstown; his businesses included a moving company, a dairy business, and a restaurant and truck stop on U.S. Route 40. Floyd also served as Brownstown's village president from 1929 to 1935. The house was built by carpenters Andrew and Charles Reeter from plans drawn by Glenora Dycus; it was designed in the Craftsman style. The entrance to the house is in a full-length front porch supported by tapered columns. The house has an intersecting roof pattern which features a half-hipped component protruding from a gable roof.

The Dycus House was listed on the National Register of Historic Places on March 2, 2001. It is one of four Fayette County sites on the Register; the other three are in Vandalia.
