= Saint-Christophe, Rhône =

Saint-Christophe
- Part of Deux-Grosnes
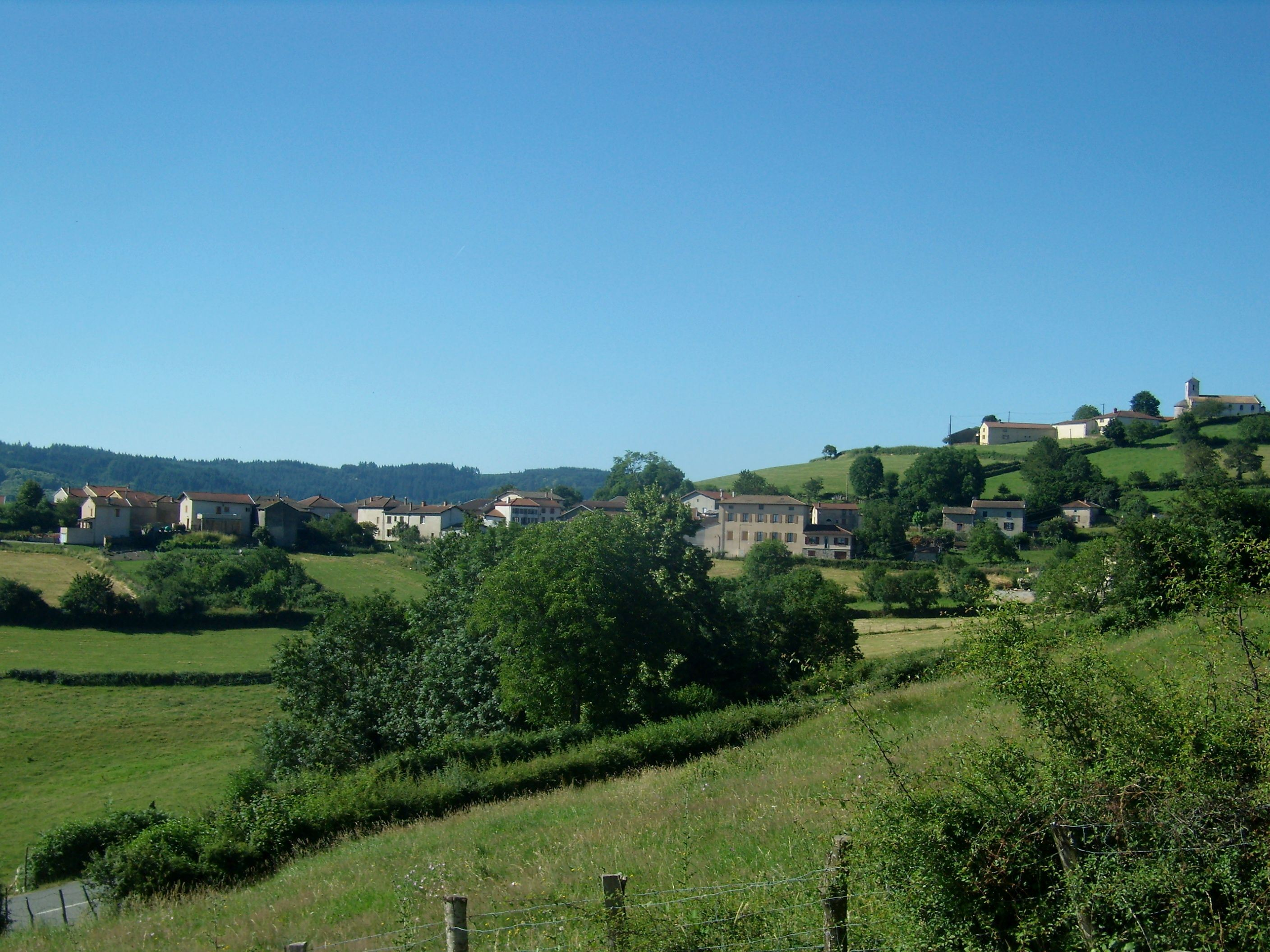
- A general view of Saint-Christophe
- Location of Saint-Christophe
- Location within France Location within Auvergne-Rhône-Alpes
- Coordinates: 46°15′46″N 4°32′33″E
- Country: France
- Region: Auvergne-Rhône-Alpes
- Department: Rhône
- Arrondissement: Villefranche-sur-Saône
- Canton: Thizy-les-Bourgs
- Commune: Deux-Grosnes
- Area^{1}: 14.62 km^{2} (5.64 sq mi)
- Elevation: 512 m (1,680 ft)
- Highest elevation: 747 m (2,451 ft)
- Lowest elevation: 377 m (1,237 ft)
- Population (2022): 229
  - Density: 15.7/km^{2} (40.6/sq mi)
- Time zone: UTC+01:00 (CET)
  - Summer (DST): UTC+02:00 (CEST)
- Postal code: 69860
- ^{1} French Land Register data, which excludes lakes, ponds, glaciers > 1 km^{2} (0.386 sq mi or 247 acres) and river estuaries.

Saint-Christophe (French pronunciation: [sɛ̃ kʁistɔf]) is a former commune in the Rhône department in eastern France. On 1 January 2019, it was merged into the new commune Deux-Grosnes.

== See also ==
- Communes of the Rhône department
