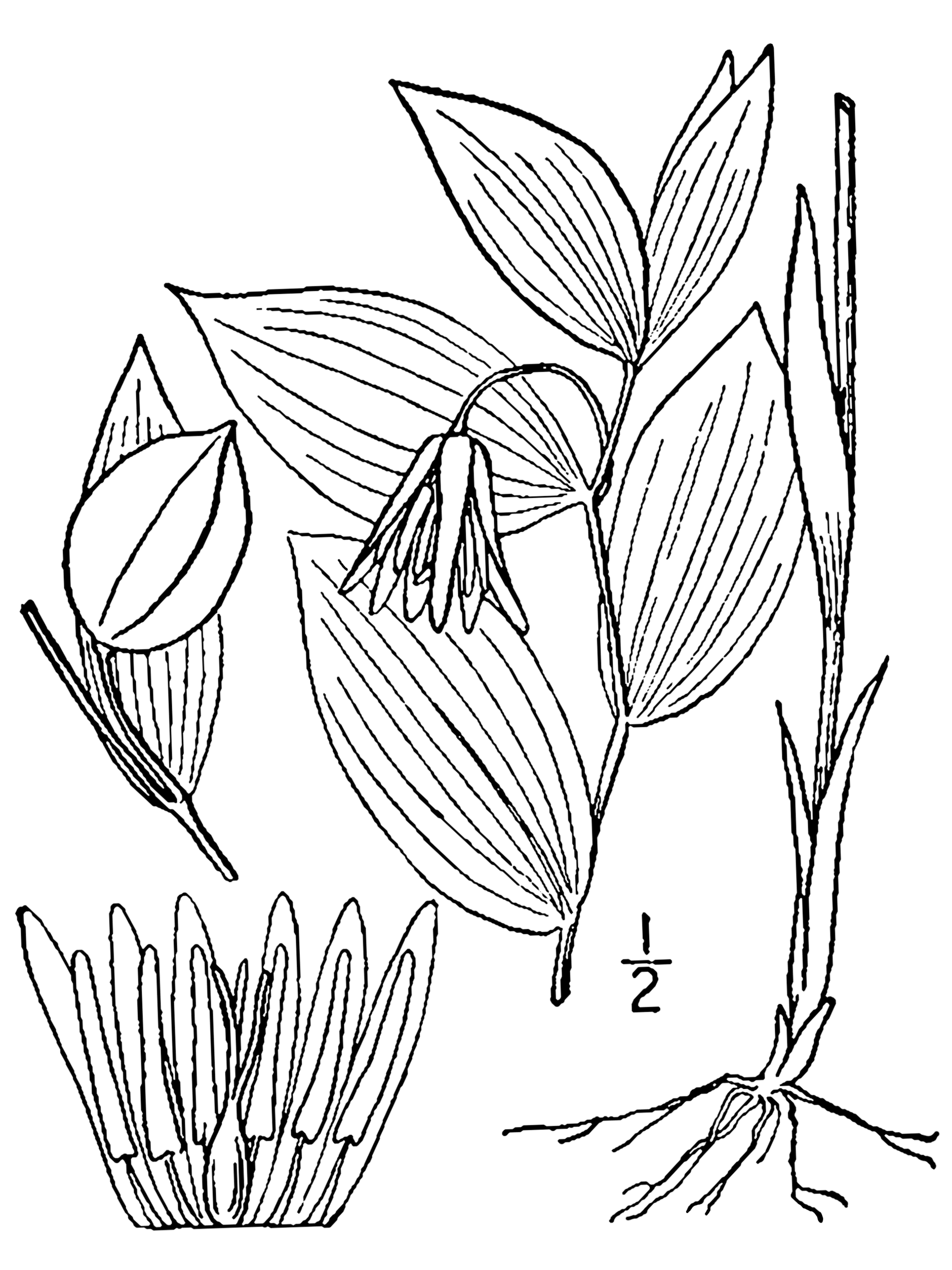
- Botanical illustration from 1913

Scientific classification
- Kingdom: Plantae
- Clade: Tracheophytes
- Clade: Angiosperms
- Clade: Monocots
- Order: Liliales
- Family: Colchicaceae
- Genus: Uvularia
- Species: U. puberula

Binomial name
- Uvularia puberula Michx. 1803 not Sm. 1818

Synonyms
- Oakesia puberula (Michx.) S.Watson; Oakesia sessilifolia var. nitida Britton; Oakesiella nitida (Britton) A.Heller; Oakesiella puberula (Michx.) Small; Uvularia nitida (Britton) Mack.

= Uvularia puberula =

Mountain bellwort

Species of flowering plant

Uvularia puberula, the mountain bellwort, is a plant species native to the eastern United States. It is common across Virginia, North and South Carolina, West Virginia, and adjacent parts of northern Georgia, eastern Tennessee, eastern Kentucky and southern Pennsylvania. Isolated populations have been found in southern Georgia, northern Alabama, southern New Jersey, and Long Island in New York State.

Uvularia puberula is a perennial herb with 1-3 pale yellow flowers per stem.
