= Uvularia floridana =

Florida bellwort

Scientific classification
- Kingdom: Plantae
- Clade: Tracheophytes
- Clade: Angiosperms
- Clade: Monocots
- Order: Liliales
- Family: Colchicaceae
- Genus: Uvularia
- Species: U. floridana

Binomial name
- Uvularia floridana Chapm.

Synonyms
- Oakesiella floridana (Chapm.) Small; Oakesia floridana (Chapm.) J.F.Macbr.

Species of flowering plant

Uvularia floridana, the Florida bellwort, is a plant species native to the US states of Florida, Georgia, Alabama, Mississippi, and South Carolina. It grows in rich hardwood forests at elevations less than 100 m.

Uvularia floridana is a perennial herb spreading by means of underground rhizomes. It has one pale yellow flower per stem.
