= Saint-Mamert =

- Part of Deux-Grosnes
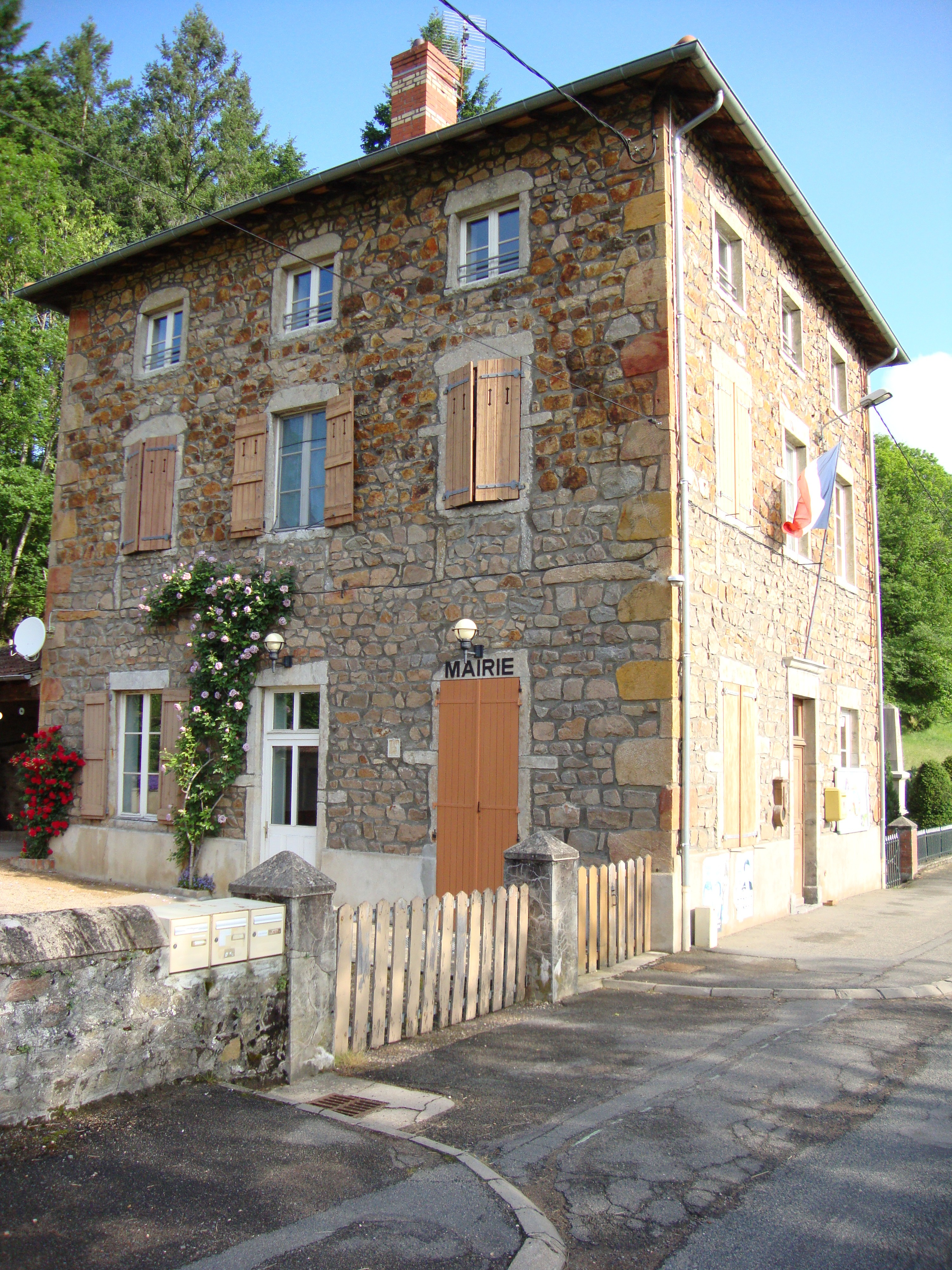
- The town hall in Saint-Mamert
- Location of Saint-Mamert
- Location within France Location within Auvergne-Rhône-Alpes
- Coordinates: 46°15′05″N 4°35′00″E
- Country: France
- Region: Auvergne-Rhône-Alpes
- Department: Rhône
- Arrondissement: Villefranche-sur-Saône
- Canton: Thizy-les-Bourgs
- Commune: Deux-Grosnes
- Area^{1}: 3.21 km^{2} (1.24 sq mi)
- Elevation: 396 m (1,299 ft)
- Highest elevation: 676 m (2,218 ft)
- Lowest elevation: 393 m (1,289 ft)
- Population (2022): 74
  - Density: 23/km^{2} (60/sq mi)
- Time zone: UTC+01:00 (CET)
  - Summer (DST): UTC+02:00 (CEST)
- Postal code: 69860
- ^{1} French Land Register data, which excludes lakes, ponds, glaciers > 1 km^{2} (0.386 sq mi or 247 acres) and river estuaries.

Saint-Mamert (French pronunciation: [sɛ̃ mamɛʁ]) is a former commune in the Rhône department in eastern France. On 1 January 2019, it was merged into the new commune Deux-Grosnes.

== See also ==
- Communes of the Rhône department
