= Trades, Rhône =

Trades
- Part of Deux-Grosnes
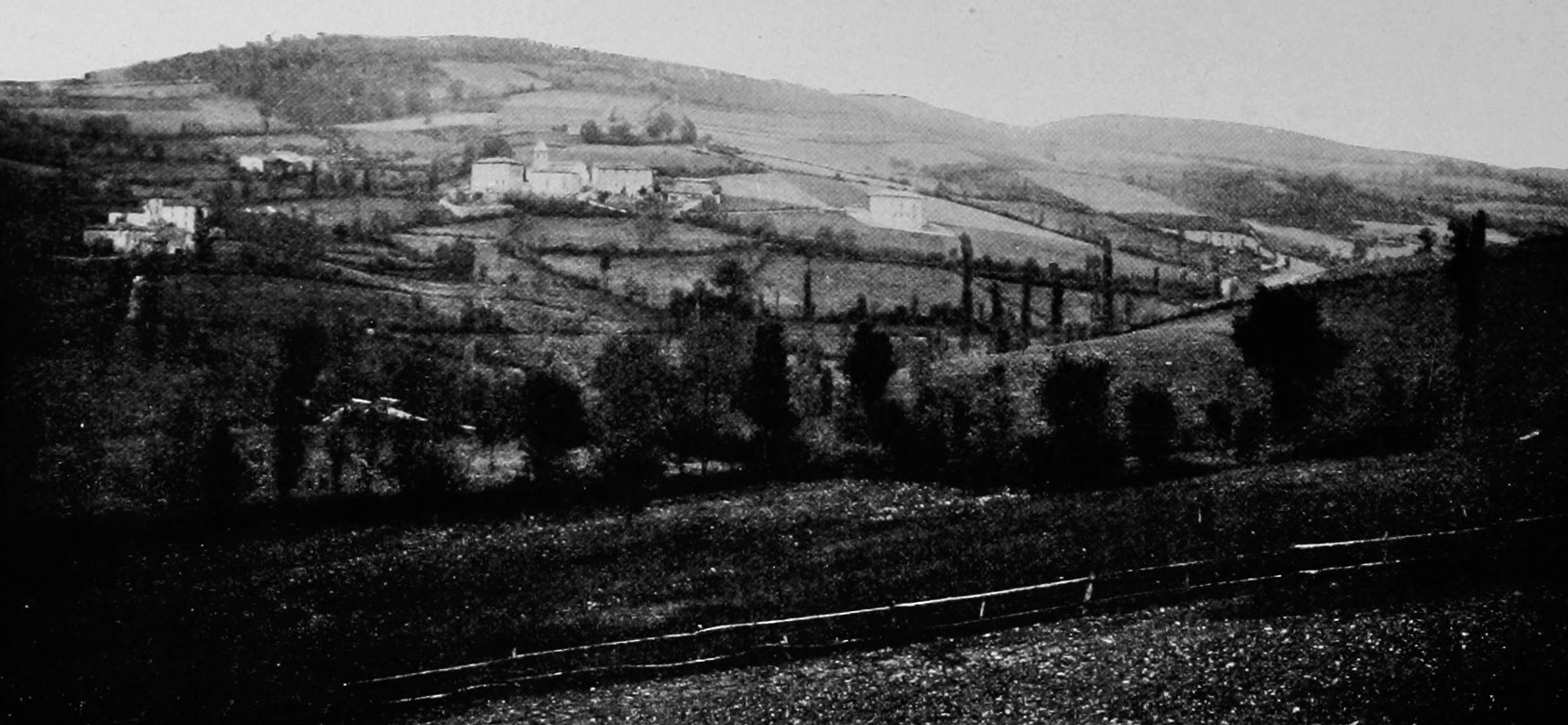
- A general view of Trades, in the early 20th century
- Location of Trades
- Location within France Location within Auvergne-Rhône-Alpes
- Coordinates: 46°16′44″N 4°33′43″E
- Country: France
- Region: Auvergne-Rhône-Alpes
- Department: Rhône
- Arrondissement: Villefranche-sur-Saône
- Canton: Thizy-les-Bourgs
- Commune: Deux-Grosnes
- Area^{1}: 7.9 km^{2} (3.1 sq mi)
- Elevation: 423 m (1,388 ft)
- Highest elevation: 642 m (2,106 ft)
- Lowest elevation: 330 m (1,080 ft)
- Population (2022): 118
  - Density: 15/km^{2} (39/sq mi)
- Time zone: UTC+01:00 (CET)
  - Summer (DST): UTC+02:00 (CEST)
- Postal code: 69860
- ^{1} French Land Register data, which excludes lakes, ponds, glaciers > 1 km^{2} (0.386 sq mi or 247 acres) and river estuaries.

Trades (French pronunciation: [tʁad]) is a former commune in the Rhône department in eastern France. On 1 January 2019, it was merged into the new commune Deux-Grosnes.

== See also ==
- Communes of the Rhône department
