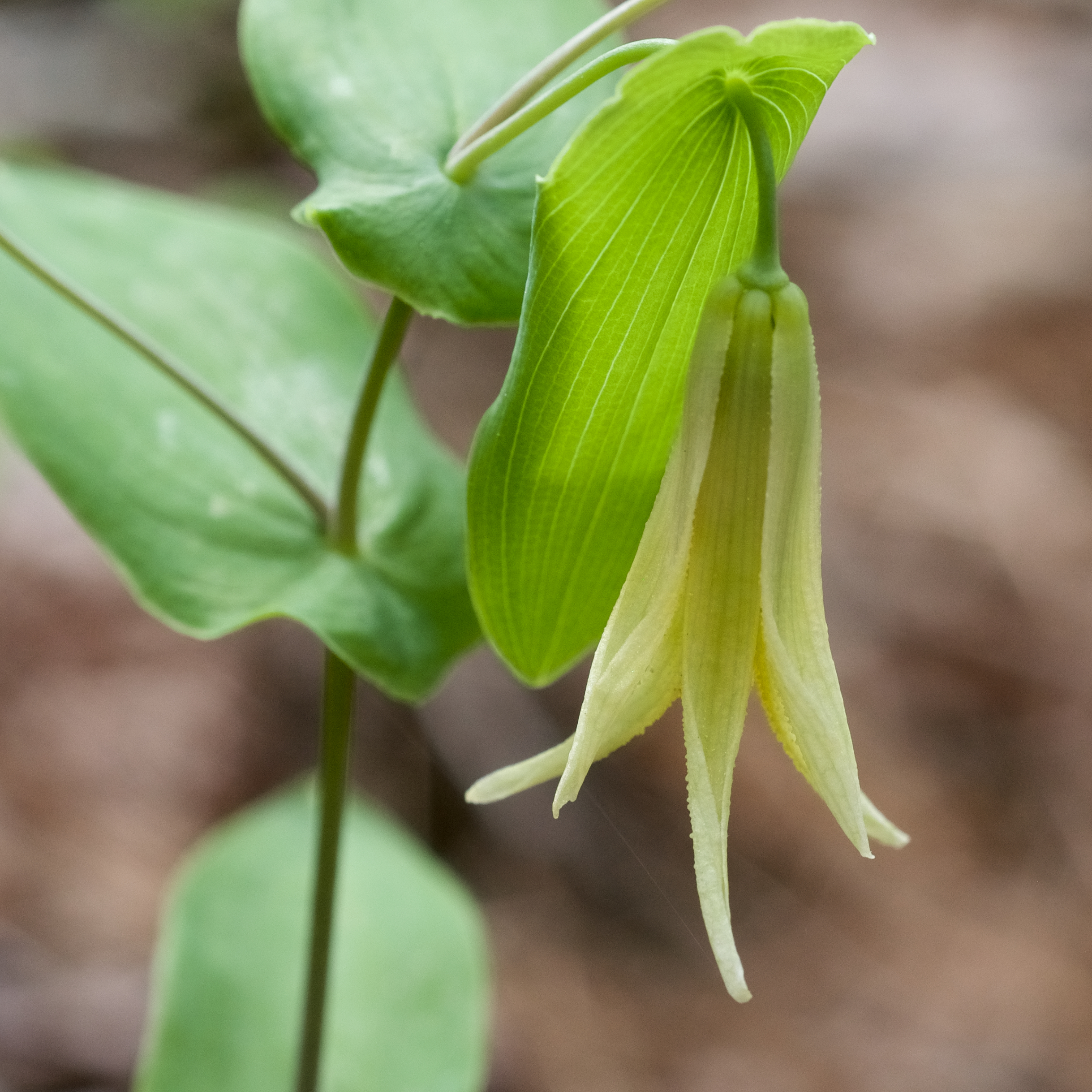

Scientific classification
- Kingdom: Plantae
- Clade: Tracheophytes
- Clade: Angiosperms
- Clade: Monocots
- Order: Liliales
- Family: Colchicaceae
- Genus: Uvularia
- Species: U. perfoliata

Binomial name
- Uvularia perfoliata L.

Synonyms
- Erythronium carolinianum J.F.Gmel.; Uvularia caroliniana (J.F.Gmel.) Wilbur; Uvularia flava Sm.; Anonymos pudica Walter; Uvularia perfoliata var. minor Michx.; Uvularia perfoliata var. major Michx.; Erythronium americanum f. carolinianum (J.F.Gmel.) Voss; Uvularia pudica Fernald

= Uvularia perfoliata =

Perfoliate bellwort

Species of flowering plant

Uvularia perfoliata, the perfoliate bellwort, is a perennial forb native to the eastern United States and Canada, which produces pale yellow flowers in spring.

== Description ==
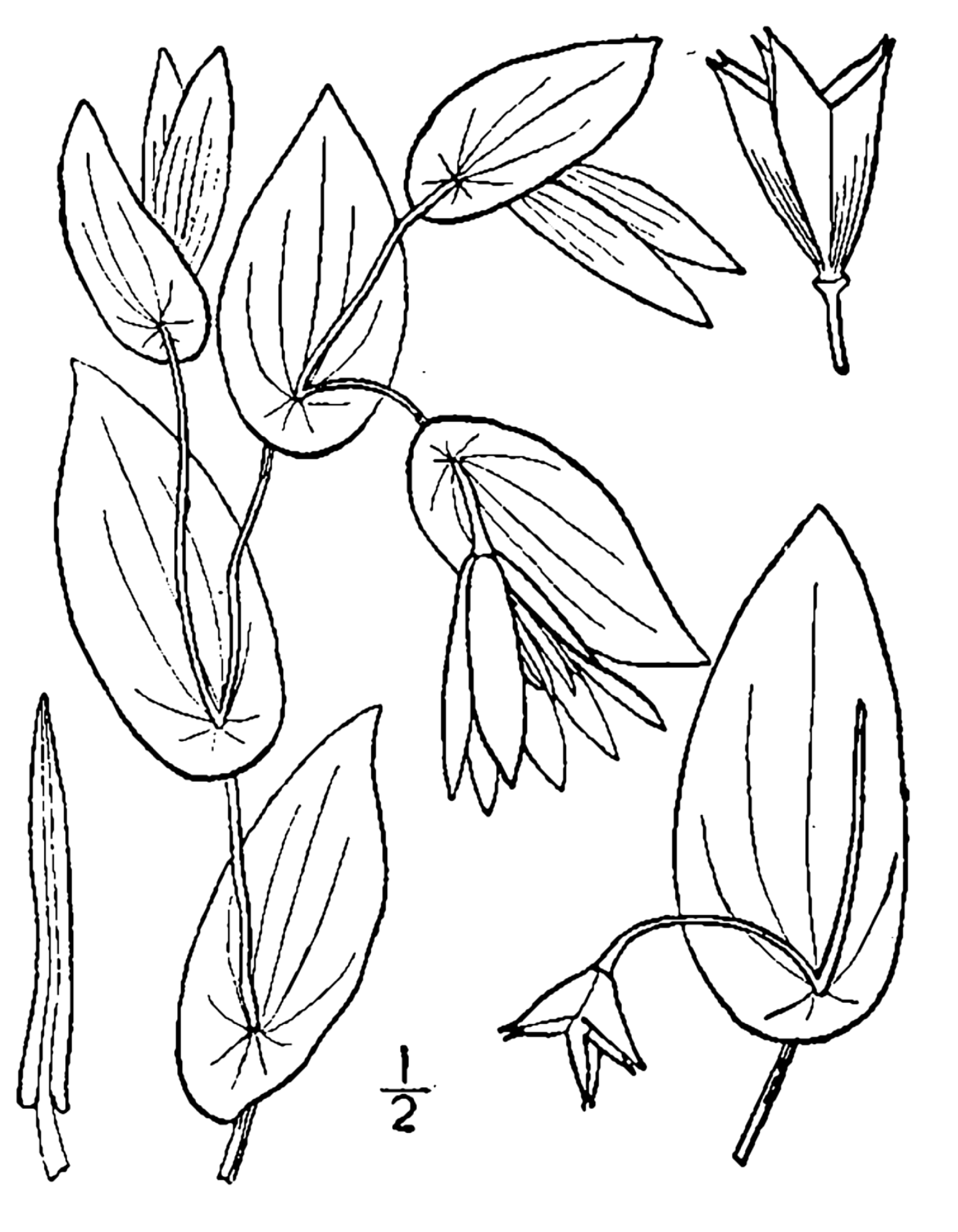
Botanical illustration of Uvularia perfoliata (1913)

The smooth slender stem of Uvularia perfoliata is 15 to 50 centimeters tall, and forked above the middle. The leaves are obovate, 4 to 12 centimeters long and 1.5 to 4 centimeters wide, glabrous or glaucous, and perfoliate. There are usually 1 to 4 leaves below the fork in the stem. The stems bear a single downward drooping flower with six 2 to 3.5 centimeter long tepals which are granular on the inside. The fruit is a triangular three lobed capsule 7 to 13 millimeters in length.

== Distribution and habitat ==
Uvularia perfoliata is widely distributed in the eastern and southern United States from Texas to New Hampshire, plus the Canadian province of Ontario. It is listed as an endangered species by the states of Indiana and New Hampshire. In Virginia, it grows in habitats such as floodplain forests, but also mesic upland forests, and dry rocky woodlands. The presence of this species is dependent on appropriate habitat, and it may be eliminated from an area by development, changes in land use, or competition with invasive species.

== Taxonomy ==
This species is a member of the genus Uvularia, which was formerly placed in the family Liliaceae, but has more recently been placed in the family Colchicaceae, in keeping with the findings of the Angiosperm Phylogeny Group.
