= Avenas =

- Part of Deux-Grosnes
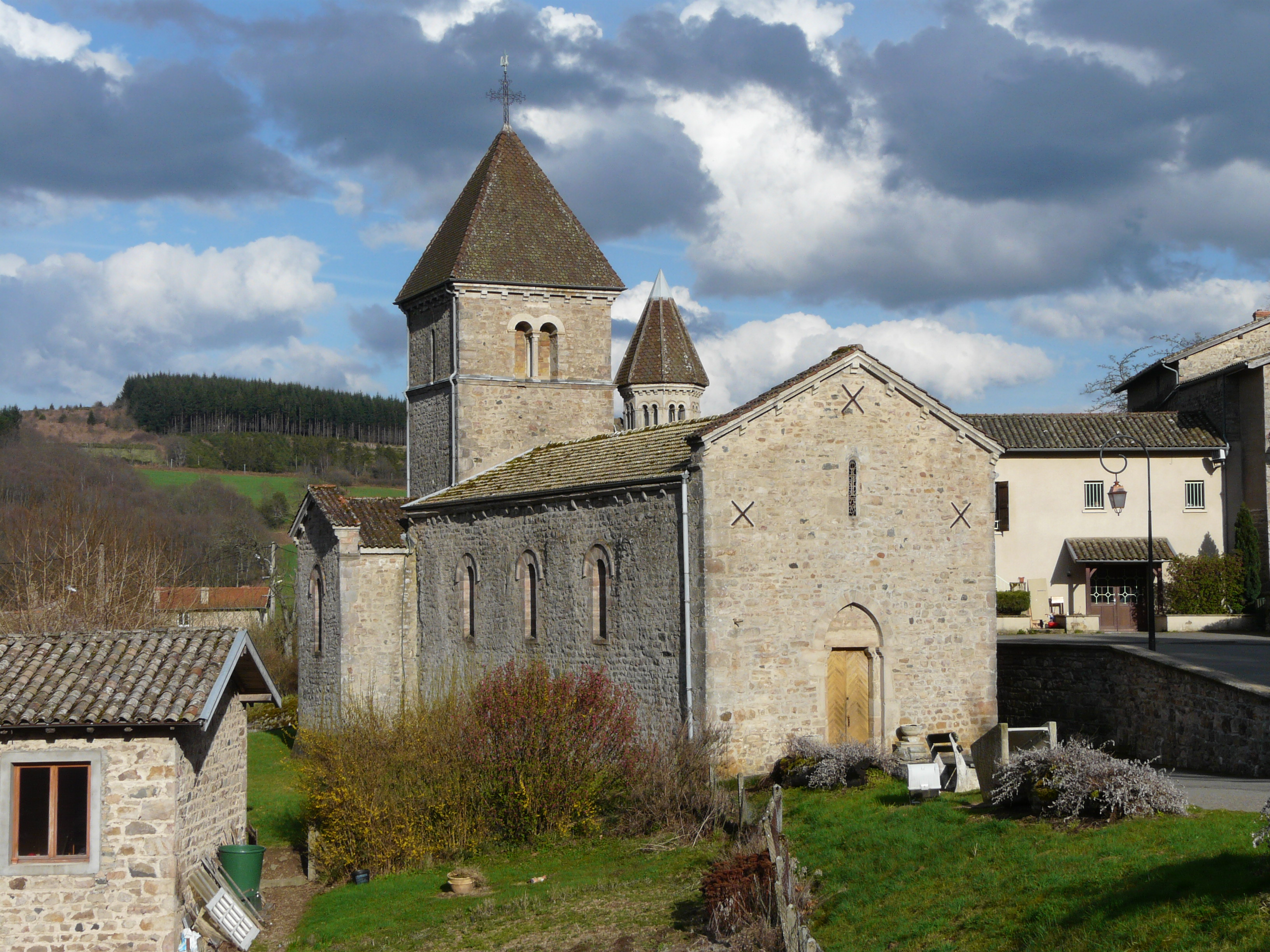
- The church in Avenas
- Location of Avenas
- Location within France Location within Auvergne-Rhône-Alpes
- Coordinates: 46°11′45″N 4°36′21″E
- Country: France
- Region: Auvergne-Rhône-Alpes
- Department: Rhône
- Arrondissement: Villefranche-sur-Saône
- Canton: Belleville
- Commune: Deux-Grosnes
- Area^{1}: 9.49 km^{2} (3.66 sq mi)
- Elevation: 780 m (2,560 ft)
- Highest elevation: 887 m (2,910 ft)
- Lowest elevation: 497 m (1,631 ft)
- Population (2022): 126
  - Density: 13.3/km^{2} (34.4/sq mi)
- Time zone: UTC+01:00 (CET)
  - Summer (DST): UTC+02:00 (CEST)
- Postal code: 69430
- ^{1} French Land Register data, which excludes lakes, ponds, glaciers > 1 km^{2} (0.386 sq mi or 247 acres) and river estuaries.

Avenas (French pronunciation: [avna]) is a former commune of the Rhône department in eastern France. On 1 January 2019, it was merged into the new commune Deux-Grosnes.

== See also ==
Communes of the Rhône department
