= Avena Township, Fayette County, Illinois =

Avena Township
- Township
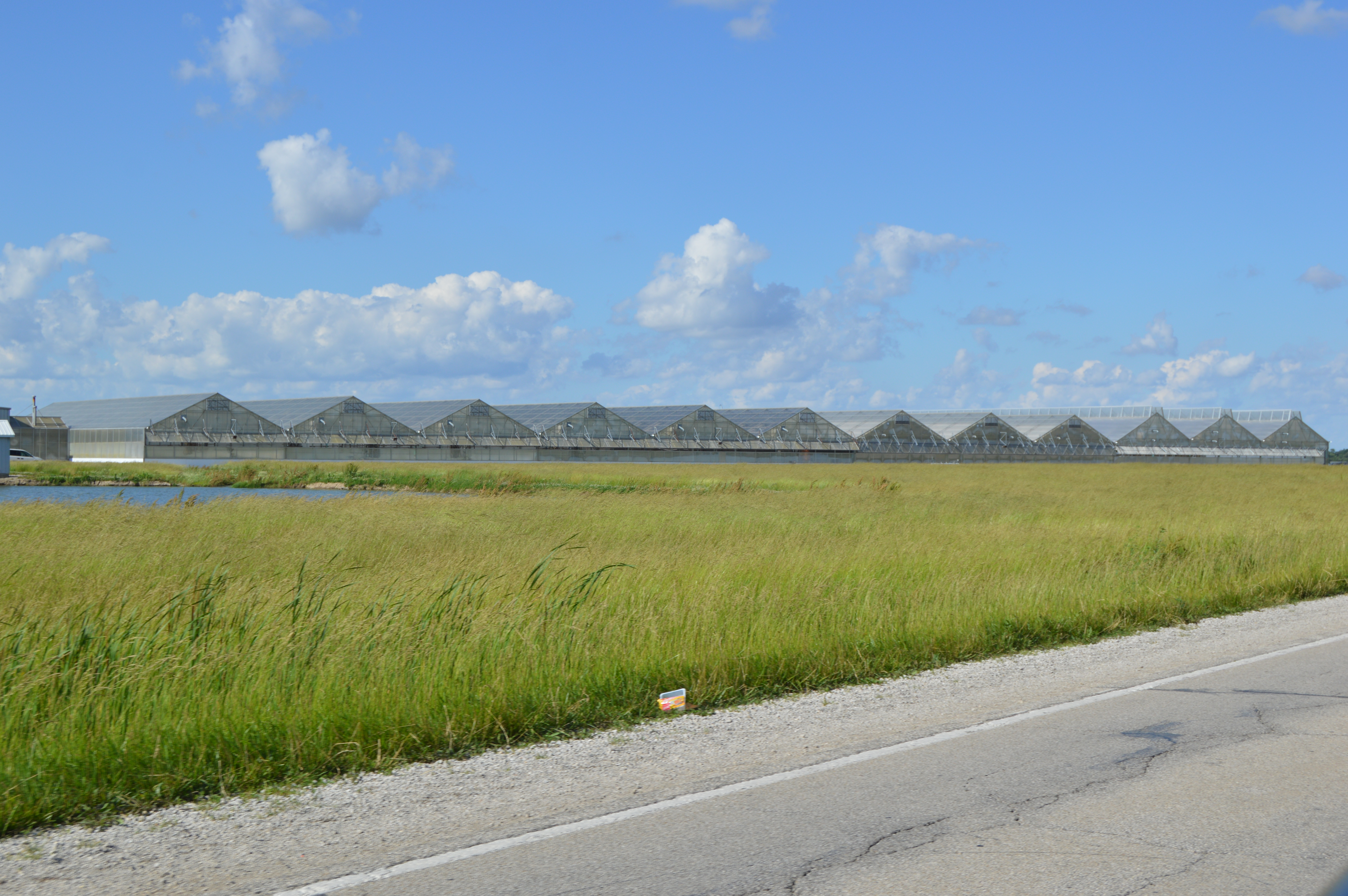
- Greenhouses on U.S. Route 40, west of St. Elmo

- Location in Fayette County

- Fayette County's location in Illinois
- Coordinates: 39°02′35″N 88°51′44″W
- Country: United States
- State: Illinois
- County: Fayette
- Established: November 9, 1859

Area
  - Total: 36.47 sq mi (94.5 km^{2})
  - Land: 36.32 sq mi (94.1 km^{2})
  - Water: 0.15 sq mi (0.39 km^{2}) 0.41%
- Elevation: 597 ft (182 m)

Population (2010)
  - Estimate (2016): 1,956
  - Density: 55.3/sq mi (21.4/km^{2})
- Time zone: UTC-6 (CST)
  - Summer (DST): UTC-5 (CDT)
- ZIP codes: 62418, 62458
- FIPS code: 17-051-03155

Avena Township is one of twenty townships in Fayette County, Illinois, USA. As of the 2020 census, its population was 1,987 and it contained 870 housing units.

== Geography ==
According to the 2021 census gazetteer files, Avena Township has a total area of 36.48 square miles (94.48 km^{2}), of which 36.32 square miles (94.07 km^{2}) (or 99.58%) is land and 0.15 square miles (0.39 km^{2}) (or 0.42%) is water.

=== Cities, towns, villages ===
- St. Elmo

=== Extinct towns ===
- Howards Point
- Pruett

=== Cemeteries ===
The township contains these five cemeteries: Crums Chapel, Guy, Maplewood, Seidner, Saint Bonaventure and Yolton.

=== Major highways ===
- Interstate 70
- U.S. Route 40

== Demographics ==
As of the 2020 census there were 1,897 people, 765 households, and 584 families residing in the township. The population density was 52.01 inhabitants per square mile (20.08/km^{2}). There were 870 housing units at an average density of 23.85 per square mile (9.21/km^{2}). The racial makeup of the township was 96.47% White, 0.16% African American, 0.00% Native American, 0.11% Asian, 0.00% Pacific Islander, 0.84% from other races, and 2.42% from two or more races. Hispanic or Latino of any race were 1.85% of the population.

There were 765 households, out of which 27.70% had children under the age of 18 living with them, 58.69% were married couples living together, 10.33% had a female householder with no spouse present, and 23.66% were non-families. 19.70% of all households were made up of individuals, and 12.50% had someone living alone who was 65 years of age or older. The average household size was 2.69 and the average family size was 3.13.

The township's age distribution consisted of 22.1% under the age of 18, 8.9% from 18 to 24, 16.7% from 25 to 44, 31.6% from 45 to 64, and 20.6% who were 65 years of age or older. The median age was 46.4 years. For every 100 females, there were 91.2 males. For every 100 females age 18 and over, there were 108.7 males.

The median income for a household in the township was $46,648, and the median income for a family was $52,500. Males had a median income of $32,361 versus $23,553 for females. The per capita income for the township was $23,539. About 10.3% of families and 16.1% of the population were below the poverty line, including 38.8% of those under age 18 and 6.2% of those age 65 or over.

Historical population
Census	Pop.	Note	%±
2000	1,974		—
2010	2,010		1.8%
2020	1,897		−5.6%
U.S. Decennial Census

== School districts ==
- Brownstown Community Unit School District 201
- St Elmo Community Unit School District 202

== Political districts ==
- Illinois's 19th congressional district
- State House District 102
- State Senate District 51
