= Sefton Township, Fayette County, Illinois =

Sefton Township
- Township
- Location in Fayette County

- Fayette County's location in Illinois
- Coordinates: 39°02′52″N 88°59′32″W
- Country: United States
- State: Illinois
- County: Fayette
- Established: November 9, 1859

Area
  - Total: 49.9 sq mi (129 km^{2})
  - Land: 49.88 sq mi (129.2 km^{2})
  - Water: 0.02 sq mi (0.052 km^{2}) 0.04%
- Elevation: 545 ft (166 m)

Population (2020)
  - Total: 559
  - Density: 11.2/sq mi (4.33/km^{2})
- Time zone: UTC-6 (CST)
  - Summer (DST): UTC-5 (CDT)
- ZIP codes: 62080, 62418, 62458, 62471
- FIPS code: 17-051-68549

Sefton Township is one of twenty townships in Fayette County, Illinois, USA. As of the 2020 census, its population was 559 and it contained 253 housing units.

== Geography ==
According to the 2010 census, the township has a total area of 49.9 square miles (129 km^{2}), of which 49.88 square miles (129.2 km^{2}) (or 99.96%) is land and 0.02 square miles (0.052 km^{2}) (or 0.04%) is water.

=== Cities, towns, villages ===
- Brownstown (northwest quarter)

=== Extinct towns ===
- Avena
- Sefton

=== Cemeteries ===
The township contains these seven cemeteries: Fairview, Forbis, Liberty, Mount Carmel, New Liberty, Padon and Zion.

=== Major highways ===
- U.S. Route 40

=== Airports and landing strips ===
- Miller Landing Strip

== Demographics ==
As of the 2020 census there were 559 people, 203 households, and 134 families residing in the township. The population density was 11.20 inhabitants per square mile (4.32/km^{2}). There were 253 housing units at an average density of 5.07 per square mile (1.96/km^{2}). The racial makeup of the township was 97.67% White, 0.36% African American, 0.00% Native American, 0.00% Asian, 0.00% Pacific Islander, 0.18% from other races, and 1.79% from two or more races. Hispanic or Latino of any race were 0.54% of the population.

There were 203 households, out of which 31.50% had children under the age of 18 living with them, 53.69% were married couples living together, 7.39% had a female householder with no spouse present, and 33.99% were non-families. 26.10% of all households were made up of individuals, and 6.40% had someone living alone who was 65 years of age or older. The average household size was 2.71 and the average family size was 3.25.

The township's age distribution consisted of 26.7% under the age of 18, 2.5% from 18 to 24, 35% from 25 to 44, 24.7% from 45 to 64, and 11.1% who were 65 years of age or older. The median age was 34.4 years. For every 100 females, there were 91.0 males. For every 100 females age 18 and over, there were 129.0 males.

The median income for a household in the township was $60,938, and the median income for a family was $67,500. Males had a median income of $43,795 versus $26,576 for females. The per capita income for the township was $27,895. About 3.7% of families and 8.4% of the population were below the poverty line, including 12.2% of those under age 18 and 0.0% of those age 65 or over.

Historical population
Census	Pop.	Note	%±
2000	568		—
2010	599		5.5%
2020	559		−6.7%
U.S. Decennial Census

== School districts ==
- Brownstown Community Unit School District 201
- Ramsey Community Unit School District 204
- St Elmo Community Unit School District 202
- Vandalia Community Unit School District 203

== Political districts ==
- Illinois' 19th congressional district
- State House District 102
- State Senate District 51
