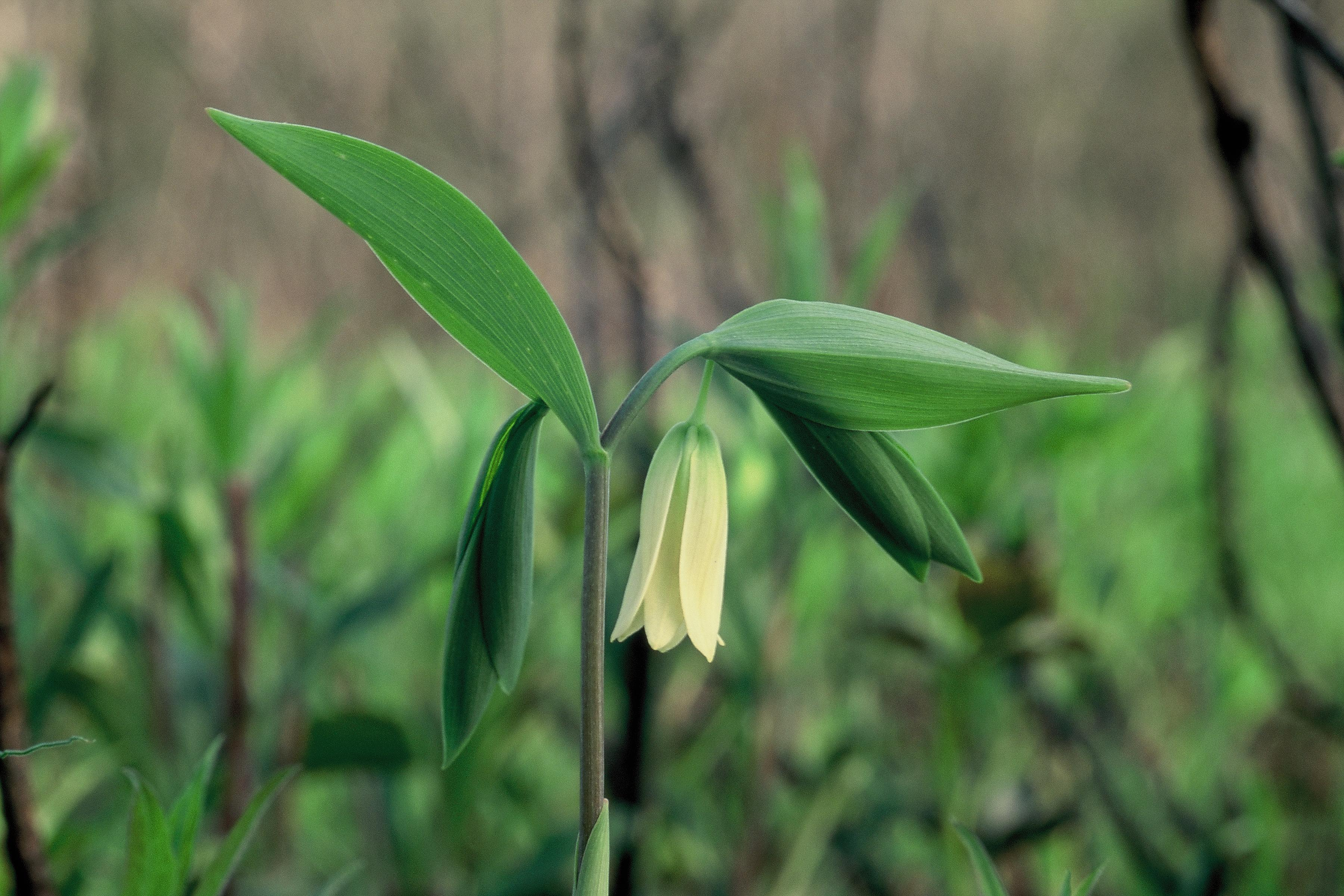

Scientific classification
- Kingdom: Plantae
- Clade: Tracheophytes
- Clade: Angiosperms
- Clade: Monocots
- Order: Liliales
- Family: Colchicaceae
- Genus: Uvularia
- Species: U. sessilifolia

Binomial name
- Uvularia sessilifolia L.

Synonyms
- Oakesia sessilifolia (L.) S.Watson; Oakesiella sessilifolia (L.) Small

= Uvularia sessilifolia =

Sessile bellwort

Species of flowering plant

Uvularia sessilifolia, the sessile bellwort, sessileleaf bellwort, little merrybells or wild oats, is a species of bellwort native to eastern and central North America. It grows in woodlands with wet or dry soils.

The strap-like leaves are sessile on the stem. The flowers are yellow, narrowly bell-shaped, and creamy yellow, blooming in spring. The leaves have no hairs on the margin and are somewhat narrow, distinguishing this plant from the similar Streptopus. They spread asexually by means of long under ground stolons with most plants in a clonal colony not flowering. Flowering plants often do not set seed, but when plants form seeds they are in three angled fruits.

The native range extends from the Atlantic Ocean from Florida to Nova Scotia, west to Texas, The Dakotas and Manitoba .

Uvularia sessilifolia 'Blizzard' is a cultivated form with misty variegated foliage.
