= St. Elmo, Illinois =

St. Elmo
- City
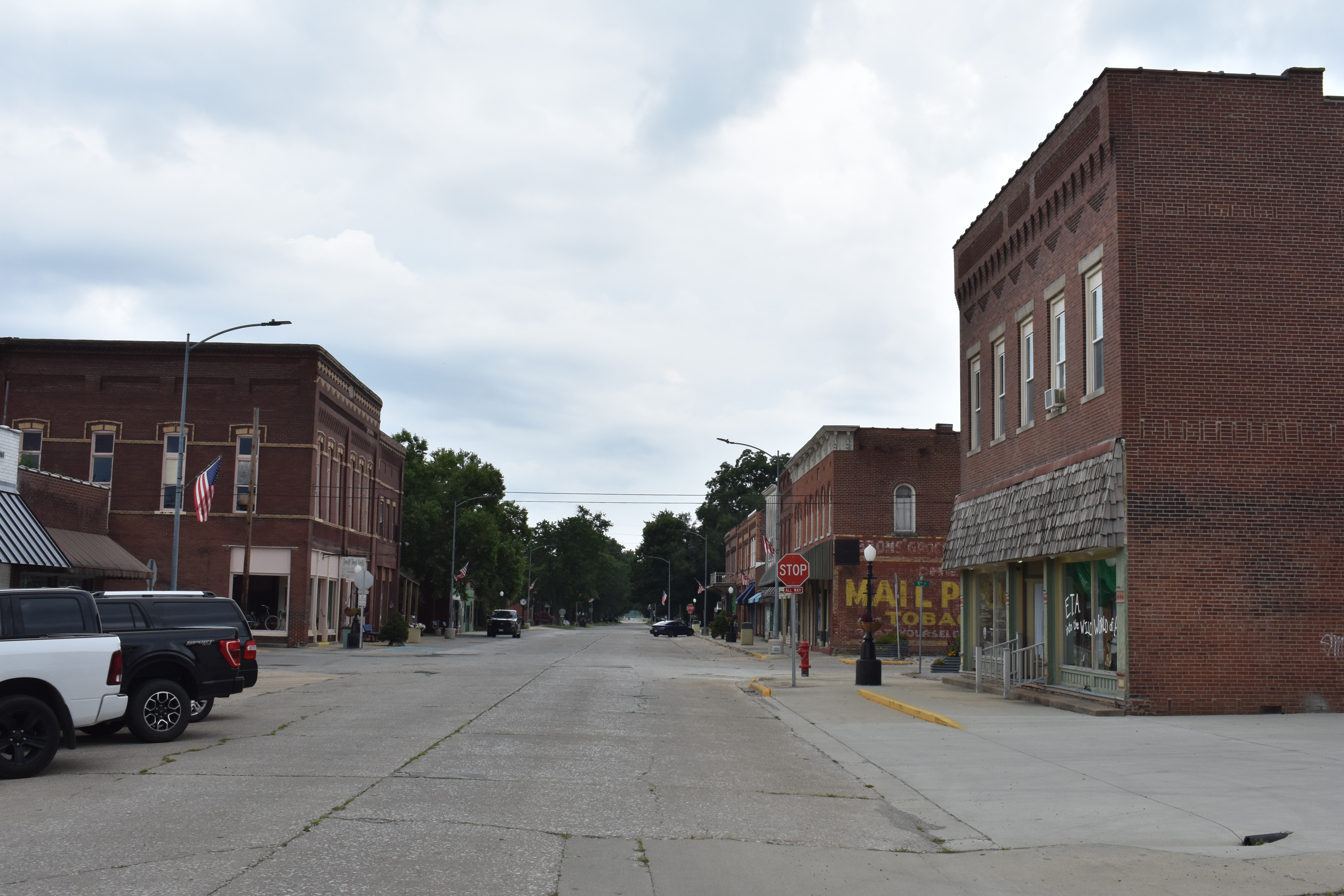
- St. Elmo in July 2026

- Location of St. Elmo in Fayette County, Illinois.
- Coordinates: 39°01′16″N 88°51′03″W
- Country: United States
- State: Illinois
- County: Fayette

Area
  - Total: 1.51 sq mi (3.90 km^{2})
  - Land: 1.48 sq mi (3.84 km^{2})
  - Water: 0.023 sq mi (0.06 km^{2})
- Elevation: 614 ft (187 m)

Population (2020)
  - Total: 1,254
  - Density: 845.5/sq mi (326.46/km^{2})
- Time zone: UTC-6 (CST)
  - Summer (DST): UTC-5 (CDT)
- ZIP code: 62458
- Area code: 618
- FIPS code: 17-66794
- GNIS feature ID: 2396486
- Website: www.cityofstelmo.com

St. Elmo or Saint Elmo is a city in Fayette County, Illinois, United States. The population was 1,254 at the 2020 census. St. Elmo was established in 1871.

== History ==
A bill to fund the National Road was signed in 1806 by President Thomas Jefferson. The highway ran from Cumberland, Maryland west to the Mississippi River. The road was designed as a route for pioneers to settle the region. U.S. Route 40 follows the course of the National Road through the state of Illinois. A hamlet known as Howard's Point was established on the National Road at the current location. Later, the name was changed to St. Elmo when a north–south railroad was planned in 1882 to terminate at the settlement. By 1895, the planned railroad bypassed the town, but an east–west railroad was constructed that connected with Vandalia. The town constructed a rail link to the Chicago, Paducah and Memphis Railroad.

Smith Aviation Field was built in 1926 on the west side of town, and it became popular for stunt flying, wing walkers, and parachute jumping. Charles Lindbergh was a regular visitor. A local oil boom in the late 1930s caused St. Elmo to be known as "Little Tulsa" and oil company executives often flew into Smith Aviation Field, which is now abandoned.

== Geography ==
According to the 2021 census gazetteer files, St. Elmo has a total area of 1.51 square miles (3.91 km^{2}), of which 1.48 square miles (3.83 km^{2}) (or 98.41%) is land and 0.02 square miles (0.05 km^{2}) (or 1.59%) is water.

== Demographics ==
Historical population
Census	Pop.	Note	%±
1870	273		—
1880	323		18.3%
1890	354		9.6%
1900	1,050		196.6%
1910	1,227		16.9%
1920	1,337		9.0%
1930	1,329		−0.6%
1940	2,290		72.3%
1950	1,716		−25.1%
1960	1,503		−12.4%
1970	1,676		11.5%
1980	1,611		−3.9%
1990	1,473		−8.6%
2000	1,456		−1.2%
2010	1,426		−2.1%
2020	1,254		−12.1%
U.S. Decennial Census

=== 2020 census ===
As of the 2020 census, St. Elmo had a population of 1,254. The median age was 40.8 years. 22.2% of residents were under the age of 18 and 20.5% were 65 years of age or older. For every 100 females, there were 95.6 males, and for every 100 females age 18 and over, there were 88.8 males.

0.0% of residents lived in urban areas, while 100.0% lived in rural areas.

There were 508 households, of which 26.8% had children under the age of 18 living in them. Of all households, 40.6% were married-couple households, 22.6% were households with a male householder and no spouse or partner present, and 28.9% were households with a female householder and no spouse or partner present. About 33.3% of all households were made up of individuals, and 18.7% had someone living alone who was 65 years of age or older.

The population density was 832.12 inhabitants per square mile (321.28/km^{2}). There were 565 housing units at an average density of 374.92 per square mile (144.76/km^{2}). Of all housing units, 10.1% were vacant. The homeowner vacancy rate was 2.4% and the rental vacancy rate was 11.6%.

Racial composition as of the 2020 census
Race	Number	Percent
White	1,213	96.7%
Black or African American	3	0.2%
American Indian and Alaska Native	0	0.0%
Asian	2	0.2%
Native Hawaiian and Other Pacific Islander	0	0.0%
Some other race	7	0.6%
Two or more races	29	2.3%
Hispanic or Latino (of any race)	16	1.3%

=== Income and poverty ===
The median income for a household in the city was $43,913, and the median income for a family was $50,662. Males had a median income of $31,528 versus $22,750 for females. The per capita income for the city was $19,890. About 14.0% of families and 22.1% of the population were below the poverty line, including 51.0% of those under age 18 and 4.5% of those age 65 or over.

== Education ==
St. Elmo is home to St. Elmo Community School District #202, which consists of the St. Elmo Elementary School, located at 519 West 2nd Street and the St. Elmo Jr/Sr High School located at the far northern edge of town at 300 West 12th Street.
