= September 1981 =

Month of 1981

<<	September 1981					>>
Su	Mo	Tu	We	Th	Fr	Sa
		1	2	3	4	5
6	7	8	9	10	11	12
13	14	15	16	17	18	19
20	21	22	23	24	25	26
27	28	29	30

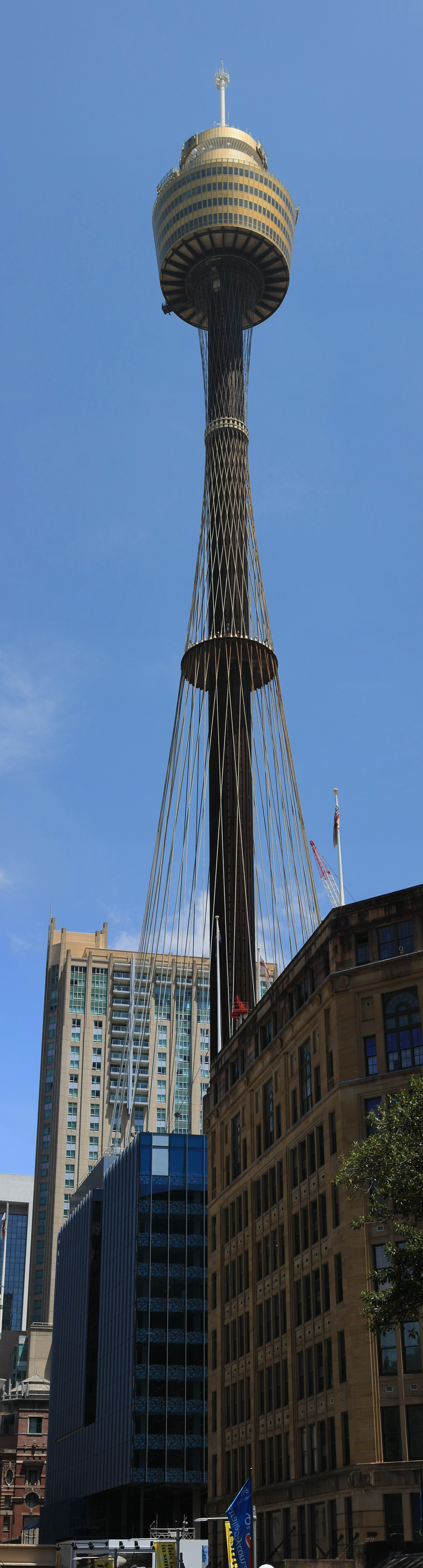
September 25, 1981: Sydney Tower opens

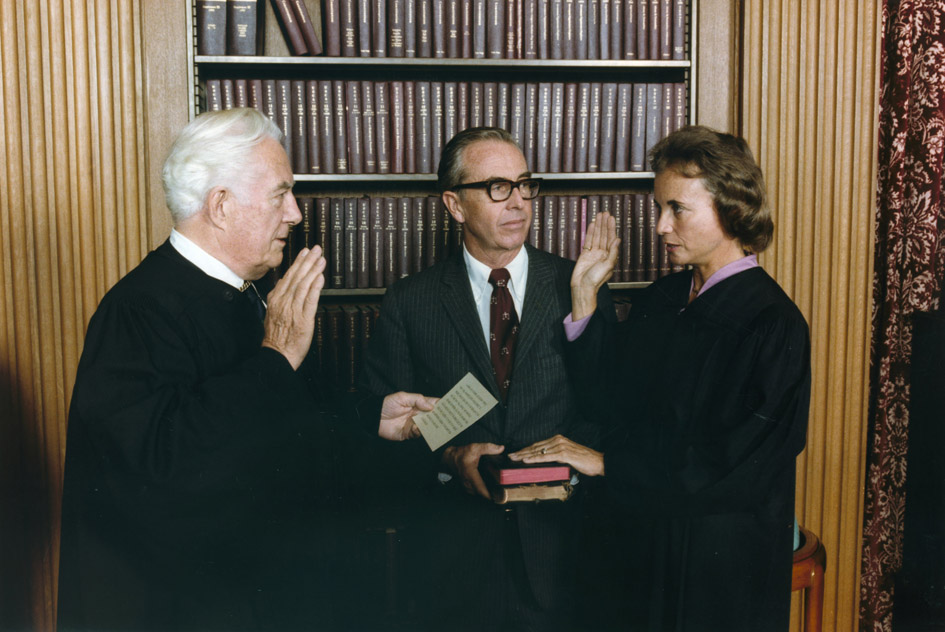
September 25, 1981: O'Connor becomes first woman justice on U.S. Supreme Court

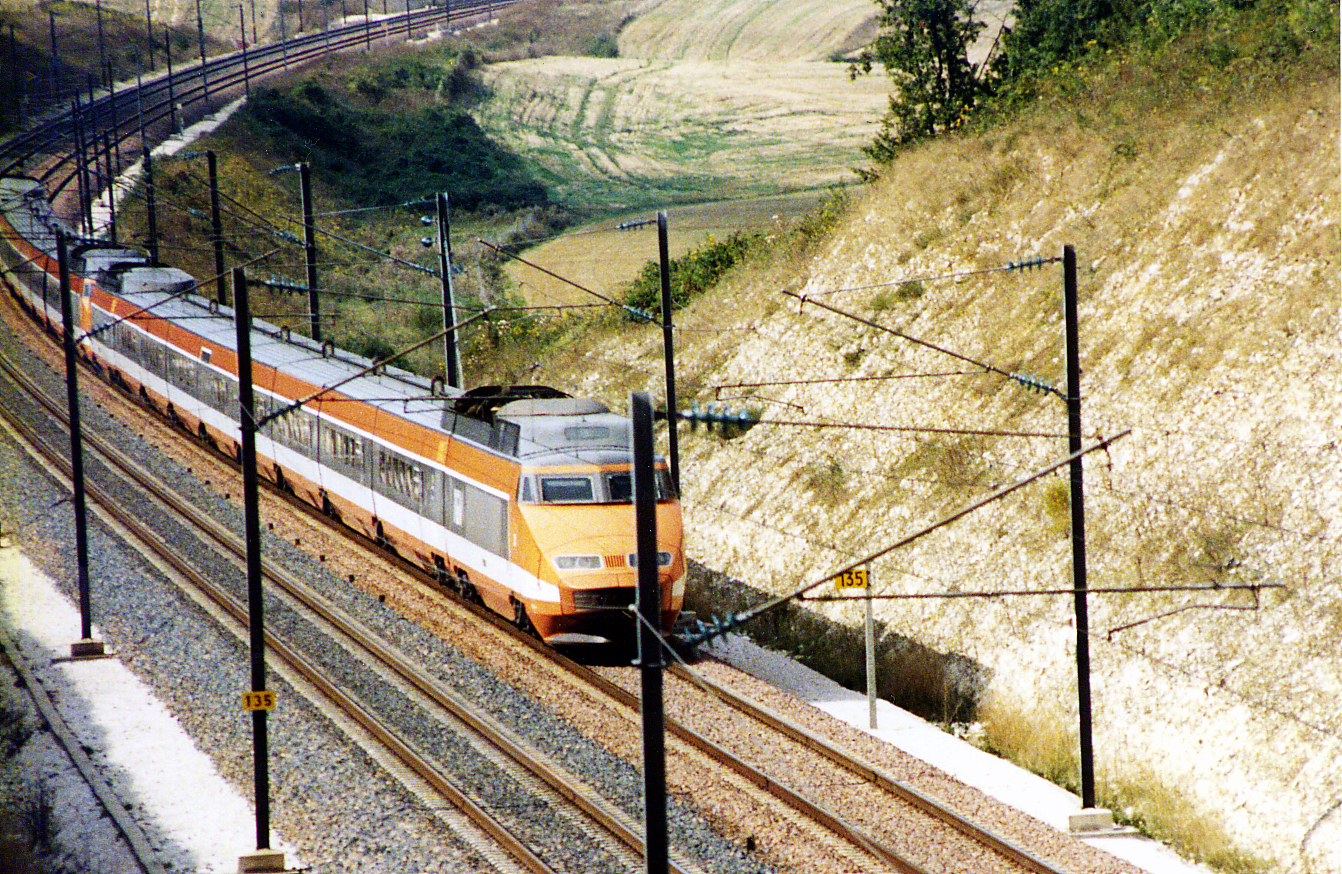
September 27, 1981: TGV high-speed train begins operations

The following events occurred in September 1981:

== September 1, 1981 (Tuesday) ==
- Typhoon Agnes struck South Korea, bringing with it the heaviest rainfall seen on the Korean peninsula in the 20th century, with as much as 28 inches (71 cm) falling over the next two days. The final toll was 120 people dead or missing.
- David Dacko, who had recently been re-elected, quit as President of the Central African Republic, turned over control to army commander General Andre Kolingba. General Kolingba remained in power until 1993.
- Roger Hargreaves' children’s book series, Little Miss, made its debut as the female counterpart to his popular Mr. Men series of books, with the publication of Little Miss Bossy.

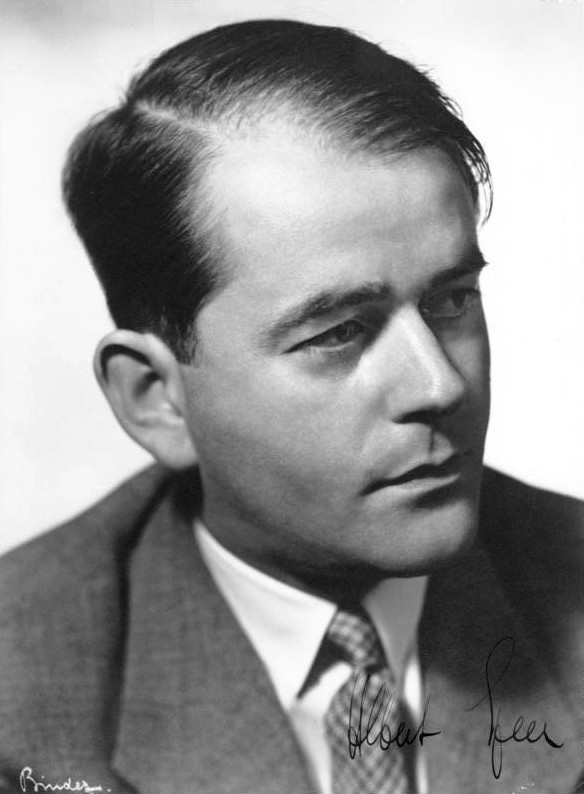
Albert Speer

- Died:
  - Albert Speer, 76, German Nazi architect and war minister
  - Ann Harding, 79, American actress

== September 2, 1981 (Wednesday) ==
- Mohammad Reza Mahdavi was approved as Iran's third Prime Minister in as many months.

== September 3, 1981 (Thursday) ==
- The United Nations Convention on the Elimination of All Forms of Discrimination Against Women (CEDAW), adopted by the UN General Assembly on December 18, 1979, went into effect by its own terms after being ratified by at least 20 nations.
- In Egypt, a nationwide arrest of 1,536 people, most of them Islamist activists, was carried out on orders of President Anwar Sadat. One of those seized was Mohammed Islambouli, leader of the Islamic Association branch at Assiut University. His younger brother, Egyptian army Lt. Khalid Islambouli, a member of the group Jihad, was so outraged that he vowed to get revenge on Sadat. A few days later, Khalid was assigned to be part of a military parade scheduled for October 6 to commemorate the eighth anniversary of Egypt's attack on Israel in the Yom Kippur War, and used the opportunity to conspire with fellow members of Jihad to carry out an assassination.
- Born: Fearne Cotton, British television presenter, as Fearne Wood in Northwood, London

== September 4, 1981 (Friday) ==
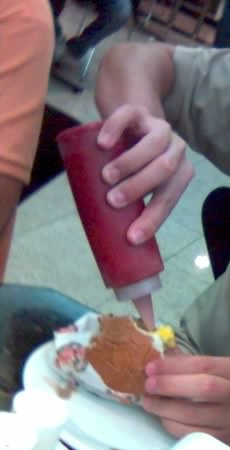
A serving of vegetables?

- The United States Department of Agriculture proposed new regulations concerning nutritional requirements for the federally subsidized school lunch program. Both ketchup and pickle relish were classified as vegetables for purposes of defining a balanced meal. The USDA withdrew the proposal three weeks later after a reporter from the Washington Post called attention to the new rules.
- An explosion at a mine in Záluží, Czechoslovakia, killed 65 people. Another 40 were rescued.
- Louis Delamare, France's ambassador to Lebanon, was assassinated in Beirut. Delamare was being driven home when four gunmen pulled alongside his BMW and opened fire.
- At 8:51 a.m. on the day of its bicentennial, Los Angeles got what was nicknamed "the birthday quake", a tremor of 5.8 magnitude, the strongest since the 1971 quake that had killed 65 people.
- Sobhuza II celebrated his 60th anniversary as King of Swaziland, in a ceremony attended by Egypt's President Sadat and Britain's Princess Margaret. Sobhuza was the first monarch since Queen Victoria to observe a diamond jubilee.
- Born: Beyoncé Knowles, American actress and R&B singer (Destiny's Child); in Houston

== September 5, 1981 (Saturday) ==
- Pope Shenuda III, head of the Coptic Christian Church of Egypt, was deposed from his job by President Anwar Sadat, who charged that Muslim and Christian extremists were conspiring to overthrow the government. Three years after Sadat's assassination, Shenuda, who had been exiled to the monastery of Saint Bishoi, was allowed by President Hosni Mubarak to return to Cairo.
- John Barnes, who would become England's greatest black soccer football player, made his professional debut at age 17, playing for the last 15 minutes of Watford F.C.'s game against Oldham Athletic.
- In the largest jailbreak within a Communist nation, 154 inmates escaped from a jail in Bydgoszcz, Poland. The mass breakout happened after a riot that began when a 17-year-old burglary suspect had been shot during an attempted escape.

== September 6, 1981 (Sunday) ==
- Nawal El Saadawi was arrested as part of the roundup of Sadat's opponents, and stayed in the Barrage Prison until November 25. She later recounted the story in her book, "Mozakerati fi signel nissa" ("Memoirs from the Women's Prison", 1983)

== September 7, 1981 (Monday) ==
- The People's Court made its syndicated television debut on 39 television stations in the United States. Created by producer Ralph Edwards, the show presented real small claims court cases, with the litigants agreeing to dismiss court proceedings and to go before retired Los Angeles Superior Court Judge Joseph A. Wapner. Of the $800 provided by the producers for each case, the amount not awarded to the plaintiff ($750 maximum) would be divided evenly between both sides. The very first case saw a landlady receive an award of $614.
- The government of Malaysia, as part of its New Economic Policy program and the efforts of Prime Minister Mahathir Mohamad, engineered the takeover of the British-owned rubber plantation company, Guthrie Group Ltd. The government investment company, Permodalan Nasional Berhad (PNB), purchased majority control of the stock in an early-morning buy on the London Stock Exchange of most of the shares of Guthrie in what was later called the "Dawn Raid attack" that achieved its goal within four hours after the market opened. The Guthrie Group's 312.5 square miles (809 km^{2}) of land was then redistributed by the government to Malaysian farmers.
- At Ruidoso Downs, New Mexico, two-year-old filly Special Effort won the All American Futurity to become quarter horse racing's first AQHA Triple Crown Winner. At the same track, Special Effort had won the "Kansas Futurity" and the "Rainbow Futurity" earlier in the year.
- The first issue of the American weekly newsmagazine Education Week was published.
- Died: Edwin Link, 77, American inventor who created the first flight simulator.

== September 8, 1981 (Tuesday) ==
- Stephen King's horror novel about a crazed St. Bernard dog, Cujo, was first published.
- Born: Jonathan Taylor Thomas, American TV actor, in Bethlehem, Pennsylvania
- Died:
  - Hideki Yukawa, 74, Japanese theoretical physicist, 1949 Nobel Prize in Physics laureate
  - Roy Wilkins, 80, leader of the NAACP.

== September 9, 1981 (Wednesday) ==
- Indian newspaper owner Jagat Narain, 92, was assassinated by three gunmen after publishing articles critical of Sikh militant Jarnail Singh Bhindranwale and Sikh demands for a separate nation. On September 20, Bhindranwale surrendered to the police, but was released on October 14 by orders of Prime Minister Indira Gandhi.
- Born:
  - Julie Gonzalo, Argentinian actress, in Buenos Aires
  - Ivan Elez, Croatian footballer, in Split City, Yugoslavia
  - Nancy Wu, Hong Kong TV actress, in Hong Kong
- Died:
  - Jacques Lacan, 80, French psychiatrist and founder of the Lacanian technique of psychoanalysis
  - Rusudana Nikoladze, 96, Georgian chemist and educator

== September 10, 1981 (Thursday) ==
- Picasso's painting "Guernica" was returned to the Museo del Prado in Madrid after having been kept at New York's Museum of Modern Art since 1939. Transfer of the painting had been kept secret until its arrival.
- In a hastily called referendum, voters in Egypt overwhelmingly endorsed Sadat's crackdown against religious and political opponents, with a reported 99.45% of nearly 11 million ballots in favor, and only 33,561 against.
- John Carta, a 35-year-old unemployed stonemason from New Rochelle, New York, became the first person to parachute on to the World Trade Center. Carta jumped from a plane at an altitude of 10,000 feet, then guided himself to a landing on to the observation deck on Tower Two.

== September 11, 1981 (Friday) ==
- Iran's Ayatollah Mir Asadollah Madani, who became the Imam for Tabriz after the 1979 assassination of the Ayatollah Mohammad Ali Qazi Tabatabaei, was himself assassinated while conducting the Jumu'ah, the Muslim Friday prayer service. Madani was approached near the end of the service by a man who was carrying a grenade, and who then detonated it. In addition to Madani and the assassin, six worshipers were fatally injured.
- A small plane crashed into the Swing Auditorium in San Bernardino, California, damaging the venue beyond repair. The crash happened at 4:40 in the afternoon and a 30 foot (9.1 m) -high hole was torn into the side of the auditorium when the Cessna 310 struck the building. The pilot, owner of a small chain of restaurants, was killed instantly along with his passenger. The venue had no casualty insurance and could not be rebuilt.
- Born: Dylan Klebold, American mass murderer in the Columbine High School massacre; in Lakewood, Colorado (d. 1999)
- Died: Frank McHugh, 83, American film actor

== September 12, 1981 (Saturday) ==
- The Smurfs began a nine-season run on NBC Saturday morning television.
- The National Assembly of France voted 329–129 to remove most of the powers of the prefects in France's 95 departments, in the first step toward decentralization of government. The bill still needed to pass the Senate and the signature of President Mitterrand to become law.
- Born: Jennifer Hudson, American singer and actress, in Chicago
- Died: Eugenio Montale, 84, Italian writer, 1975 Nobel Prize in Literature laureate

== September 13, 1981 (Sunday) ==
- Two days of elections began in Norway, and the Labor Party lost its majority in the 155 member Storting. Labor, led by Gro Harlem Brundtland, retained 67 seats, but the Conservatives, led by supply side economist Kare Willoch, claimed victory with 54 seats and a potential coalition of 79.

== September 14, 1981 (Monday) ==
- Entertainment Tonight made its syndicated debut in various television markets.
- Nikolai Glushkov, Chairman of the State Prices Commission in the Soviet Union, confirmed rumors that had caused a run on stores, announcing sharp price increases for the following day, doubling the price of gasoline from the equivalent of $1.06 a gallon to $2.12. Glushkov also increased prices on tobacco and liquor, saying that it was in response to requests from workers "to limit the demand for them". He also said that prices for synthetic fabrics, household appliances, medicines and some watches would be cut by up to 37%, and noted that meat, dairy and bread prices had been unchanged for nearly 20 years.

== September 15, 1981 (Tuesday) ==
- General Frederick J. Kroesen, commander of the U.S. Army in Europe, was slightly injured in an assassination attempt in West Germany. Two rocket-propelled grenades were fired at his armor-plated car as he was being driven through Heidelberg.
- The John Bull became the oldest operable steam locomotive in the world, at 150 years old, when it operated under its own power outside Washington, DC.
- Born: Ben Schwartz, American actor and comedian, in the Bronx, New York City
- Died: Harold Bennett, 81, British actor

== September 16, 1981 (Wednesday) ==
- World Boxing Council champion Sugar Ray Leonard and World Boxing Association champion Thomas Hearns fought at Caesars Palace in Las Vegas for the world welterweight boxing championship. In the 14th round, Leonard won in a technical knockout, pounding away with Hearns on the ropes, until referee Davey Pearl stopped the fight.
- In Britain, the Liberal Party conference voted 1,688-112 for an electoral pact with the new Social Democratic Party.
- The stop-motion animated British children's series Postman Pat was introduced by the BBC One network. "Postman Pat's creator looks back at its conception", BBC News September 16, 2011
- Born: Alexis Bledel, American actress, in Houston

== September 17, 1981 (Thursday) ==
- The Gerald R. Ford Presidential Museum was dedicated at Grand Rapids, Michigan in a ceremony attended by the three heads of government of North America. U.S. President Ronald Reagan, Canadian Prime Minister Pierre Trudeau, and Mexican President Jose Lopez Portillo met in a "minisummit" at breakfast in Reagan's hotel suite, and comedian Bob Hope later entertained the 38th President and his guests.
- The popular German war film Das Boot, produced by Gunter Rohrbach, directed by Wolfgang Petersen, and starring Jürgen Prochnow, was released in West Germany and later in the rest of the world. It became the highest-grossing German film in Germany. The film was based on the novel by German civilian war correspondent Lothar-Günther Buchheim who had ridden with the crew of the German U-Boat U-96, which torpedoed and sank 27 freighters and which was later sunk on March 30, 1945.
- Ric Flair defeated Dusty Rhodes to win his first World Heavyweight Wrestling Championship in Kansas City.
- Died: Rafael Méndez, 75, Mexican-born trumpet virtuoso

== September 18, 1981 (Friday) ==
- EINECS, the European Inventory of Existing Commercial Chemical Substances, was issued by the European Community, containing the first list of every chemical substance in the EC nations.
- The Memphis Group, a collection of innovative post-modern furniture designers led by Ettore Sottsass, debuted its work in Milan, Italy.
- An Aeroflot passenger airplane with 33 people on board was making its approach for a landing at the Russian city of Zheleznogorsk-Ilimsky when it was struck by a Soviet Army helicopter on a training mission. All 33 on the plane, and 7 on the helicopter, were killed.

== September 19, 1981 (Saturday) ==
- Simon & Garfunkel reunited to perform The Concert in Central Park, a free concert in New York in front of approximately half a million people.
- The Solidarity Day march took place in Washington D.C.
- The 80-year-old Brazilian river boat Sobral Santos capsized in the Amazon River, Óbidos, Brazil, killing at least 300 people.

== September 20, 1981 (Sunday) ==
- For the first time, China launched three satellites into orbit, on a rocket from the Jiuquan Satellite Launch Center. The feat led some observers to speculate that China had gained the ability to launch multiple nuclear warheads or that it had set up an early warning system against missile attacks.
- Karen Williams, a stewardess on board World Airways Flight 32, a DC-10, was crushed to death in the airplane's service elevator during a flight from Baltimore to London.

== September 21, 1981 (Monday) ==
British Honduras

Belize

- Belize, formerly British Honduras attained independence, with George Price serving as its first Prime Minister, and Dame Minita Gordon as its Governor-General.
- The appointment of Sandra Day O'Connor was confirmed by the U.S. Senate, 99–0, for her to become the 102nd justice of the United States Supreme Court.
- Born: Nicole Richie, American actress, singer and socialite, in Berkeley, California

== September 22, 1981 (Tuesday) ==
- The initial public offering of stock in The Home Depot was made at $12.00 per share as the company was listed on the NASDAQ exchange. The stock was worth 20 times as much within two years, and with 13 successive stock splits over the next 18 years, the value of a 1981 share of stock was worth 370 times as much, so that initial investment of $5,000 in 1981 would have been worth $1.8 million in 1999. By 2010, the $5,000 investment would have been worth more than six million dollars.
- Born: Alexei Ramírez, Cuban-born Major League Baseball player, in Pinar del Río
- Died: Harry Warren, 87, American songwriter and three time Oscar winner

== September 23, 1981 (Wednesday) ==
- U.S. National Security Adviser Richard Allen announced plans by the Reagan Administration to create a radio station that would broadcast to Cuba, patterned after Radio Free Europe. Though initially set to launch in January 1982, Radio Marti did not start transmission until May 20, 1985.
- Died: Chief Dan George, 82, Canadian First Nations actor

== September 24, 1981 (Thursday) ==
- A day after meeting for the first time, U.S. Secretary of State Alexander Haig, and U.S.S.R. Foreign Minister Andrei Gromyko issued a joint statement that the two nations would resume discussions on controlling the growth of nuclear weapons in Europe, beginning on November 30 in Geneva.
- The largest crowd ever to attend a greyhound racing event in the United States—21,000 people—turned out at Southland Greyhound Park in West Memphis, Arkansas, wagering 1.3 million dollars on the racing dogs.

== September 25, 1981 (Friday) ==
- The Sydney Tower, fifth tallest building in the world opened to the public.
- The Rolling Stones began their 40-city Tattoo You tour at JFK Stadium in Philadelphia, playing before a crowd of 90,000.
- Sandra Day O'Connor took her seat as the first female justice of the U.S. Supreme Court.
- Belize became the 156th member of the United Nations.

== September 26, 1981 (Saturday) ==
Black-footed ferret: not extinct

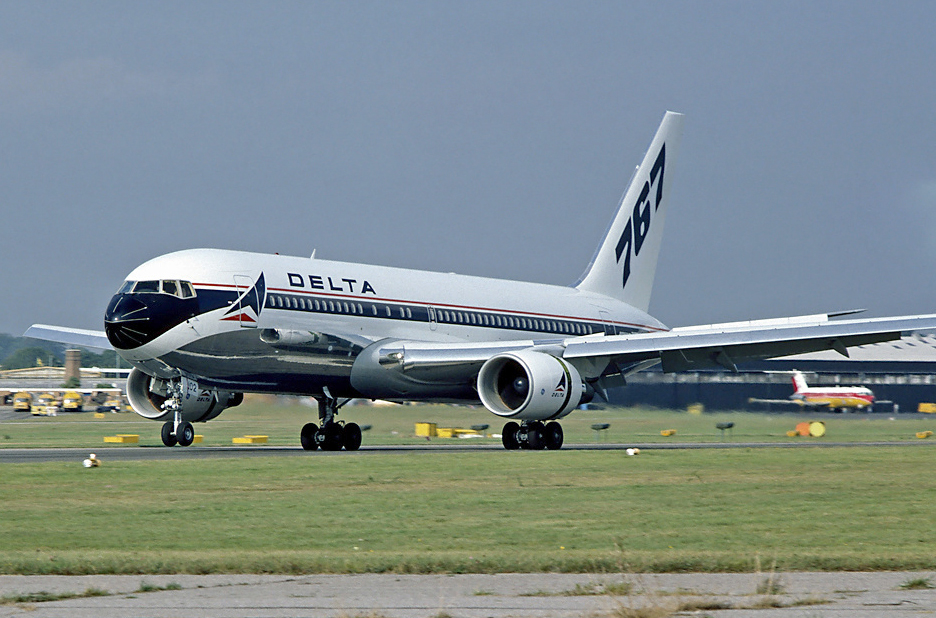
A Boeing 767-200

- Believed to have become extinct in 1975, the black-footed ferret (Mustela nigripes) was rediscovered in Meeteetse, Wyoming by a dog, which had attacked and killed the animal. The following month, a live ferret was found in the same area.
- The Boeing 767 airliner made its first flight, taking off from Everett, Washington at 11:55 am. Piloted by Tom Edmonds and Lew Wallick, along with John Britt, the jet reached an altitude of 17,000 feet and a speed of 260 miles per hour, and landing again at 1:58 p.m.
- Nolan Ryan broke the Major League Baseball record for career no-hitters, hurling his fifth game without allowing a hit. Previously, he and Sandy Koufax had shared the record of four no-hitters.
- Born:
  - Serena Williams, American professional tennis player, formerly ranked No. 1 in the world for 319 weeks between 2002 through 2017 and winner of a record 23 grand slam singles titles, 14 grand slam doubles titles, 1 Olympic gold medal in singles, and 3 Olympic gold medals (w/sister Venus Williams); in Saginaw, Michigan
  - Christina Milian, American R&B singer and actress, in Jersey City, New Jersey
  - Yao Beina, Chinese female singer, in Wuhan, Hubei (d. 2015)

== September 27, 1981 (Sunday) ==
- The first commercial run of the TGV high-speed rail service train began, traversing the 300-mile distance between Paris and Lyons. At 6:15 am, the Train a Grande Vitesse pulled out of the Gare de Lyon in Paris with 772 passengers, then accelerated along the high-speed line at Saint-Florentin at 156 miles per hour, arriving in Lyons at 9:05 am.
- The hijacking of a Yugoslavian JAT Boeing 727 was thwarted after a fire alarm was sounded and the 101 passengers and 7 crew escaped unharmed. The plane had been seized the night before during a flight from Dubrovnik to Belgrade, flew to Athens for refueling, then landed at the Cypriot city of Larnaka, where the escape took place.
- Died: Robert Montgomery, 77, American actor

== September 28, 1981 (Monday) ==
- After stock analyst Joseph Granville had predicted over the weekend that a "Blue Monday" would see stock prices fall, record sell-offs took place. In Tokyo, where the markets opened first, the Nikkei 225 fell 302.84 points, the largest single-day drop on record, and when the London Stock Exchange opened, the FT Index dropped a record 29.4 points. Less drastic declines happened in Sydney, Singapore, Hong Kong, Frankfurt, Zürich and Paris. Stock prices fell initially in New York and Toronto, but rallied later in the day. Tokyo and London made strong recoveries the next day.
- Died: Rómulo Betancourt, 73, former President of Venezuela

== September 29, 1981 (Tuesday) ==
- President Reagan issued Executive Order 12324 to halt the flow of refugees from Haiti into the United States. Since 1978, almost 50,000 Haitian citizens fled the regime of Jean-Claude Duvalier and most were detained in South Florida. Reagan ordered the U.S. Coast Guard to intercept and board any refugee vessels and return them to their nation of origin.
- U.S. Senator William Proxmire (D-Wisconsin) completed a filibuster at 10:27 a.m., yielding the floor after beginning a speech of more than 16 hours the day before. Proxmire, famous for his monthly "Golden Fleece Award" for wasteful government spending, had spoken out against U.S. Senate approval of a bill to raise the debt ceiling above one trillion dollars. The cost of his speech to taxpayers, most of it for printing in the Congressional Record, was estimated at $64,674.
- A 17-year-old Mojahed assassin detonated a hand grenade, killing Iranian Shia cleric Abdolkarim Hasheminejad, the local Islamic Republican Party leader, along with himself after infiltrating the party headquarters in the city of Mashhad in Iran.
- Died: Bill Shankly, 68, British football manager who won multiple championships for Liverpool F.C.

== September 30, 1981 (Wednesday) ==
- The United States' debt ceiling was raised to one trillion dollars for the first time in history, the day after the U.S. Senate, by a margin of 64–34, approved an increase of the government's credit limit from $985 billion to $1,079,000,000,000. President Reagan signed the legislation at 8:15 pm in Washington.
- Pakistani commandos stormed a hijacked Indian Airlines jet and rescued all 45 hostages, two hours before a deadline for action. The plane had been seized the day before by three Sikh nationalists, then flown to Lahore.
- The International Olympic Committee session in Baden-Baden, West Germany awarded the 1988 Winter Olympics in Calgary and the 1988 Summer Olympics in Seoul.
- Born: Cecelia Ahern, Irish novelist, in Dublin
