= List of ambassadors of France to Lebanon =

The following is a list of ambassadors of France to Lebanon.

Start of term	End of term	Ambassador (or diplomat of highest rank prior to 1953)
1945	1946	Charles Lucet (Ambassador of the French Provisional Government)
1946	1952	Armand Blanquet du Chayla (with the title of Envoy Extraordinary and Minister Plenipotentiary)
1952	1955	Georges Balaÿ (Envoy Extraordinary and Minister Plenipotentiary until 1953 and then Ambassador)
1955	1960	Louis Roche
1960	1964	Robert Barbara de Labelotterie de Boisséson
1964	1967	Pierre-Louis Gabriel Falaize
1967	1969	Pierre Millet
1969	1971	Bernard Dufournier
1971	1975	Michel Fontaine
1975	1979	Hubert Argod
1979	1981	Louis Delamare
1981	1983	Paul-Marc Henry
1983	1985	Fernand Wibaux
1985	1987	Christian Graeff
1987	1988	Paul Blanc
1988	1991	René Ala
1991	1993	Daniel Husson
1993	1994	Michel Chatelais
1994	1997	Jean-Pierre Lafon
1997	1999	Daniel Jouanneau
1999	2004	Philippe Lecourtier
2004	2008	Bernard Émié
2008	2009	André Parant
2009	2012	Denis Pietton
2012	2015	Patrice Paoli
2015	2017	Emmanuel Bonne
2017	2020	Bruno Foucher
2020	2023	Anne Grillo
2023	Incumbent	Hervé Magro

== See also ==
- France–Lebanon relations
