= Bruno Foucher =

French diplomat

Ambassador of France to Lebanon
- In office 2017–2020
- Preceded by: Emmanuel Bonne
- Succeeded by: Anne Grillo

President of Institut Français
- In office 2016–2017
- Preceded by: Denis Pietton
- Succeeded by: Pierre Buhler

Ambassador of France to Iran
- In office 2011–2016
- Preceded by: Bernard Poletti
- Succeeded by: François Sénémaud

Ambassador of France to Chad
- In office 2006–2010
- Preceded by: Jean-Pierre Berçot
- Succeeded by: Michel Reveyrand-de Menthon

Personal details
- Born: 3 October 1960 (age 66) Bordj Bou Arréridj, Algeria
- Education: École nationale d'administration
- Occupation: Diplomat

Bruno Foucher (born 3 October 1960) is a French diplomat. He has been ambassador of France to Lebanon since 2017 until 2020.

In 2026, Foucher, by then the ambassador to the Central African Republic, was subjected to disciplinary proceedings by the French Foreign Ministry following allegations that he brought around 30 young women to his official residence in Bangui from 2024 to 2026.
