= November 1981 =

Month of 1981

| << | November 1981 | | | | | >> |
| Su | Mo | Tu | We | Th | Fr | Sa |
| 1 | 2 | 3 | 4 | 5 | 6 | 7 |
| 8 | 9 | 10 | 11 | 12 | 13 | 14 |
| 15 | 16 | 17 | 18 | 19 | 20 | 21 |
| 22 | 23 | 24 | 25 | 26 | 27 | 28 |
| 29 | 30 |

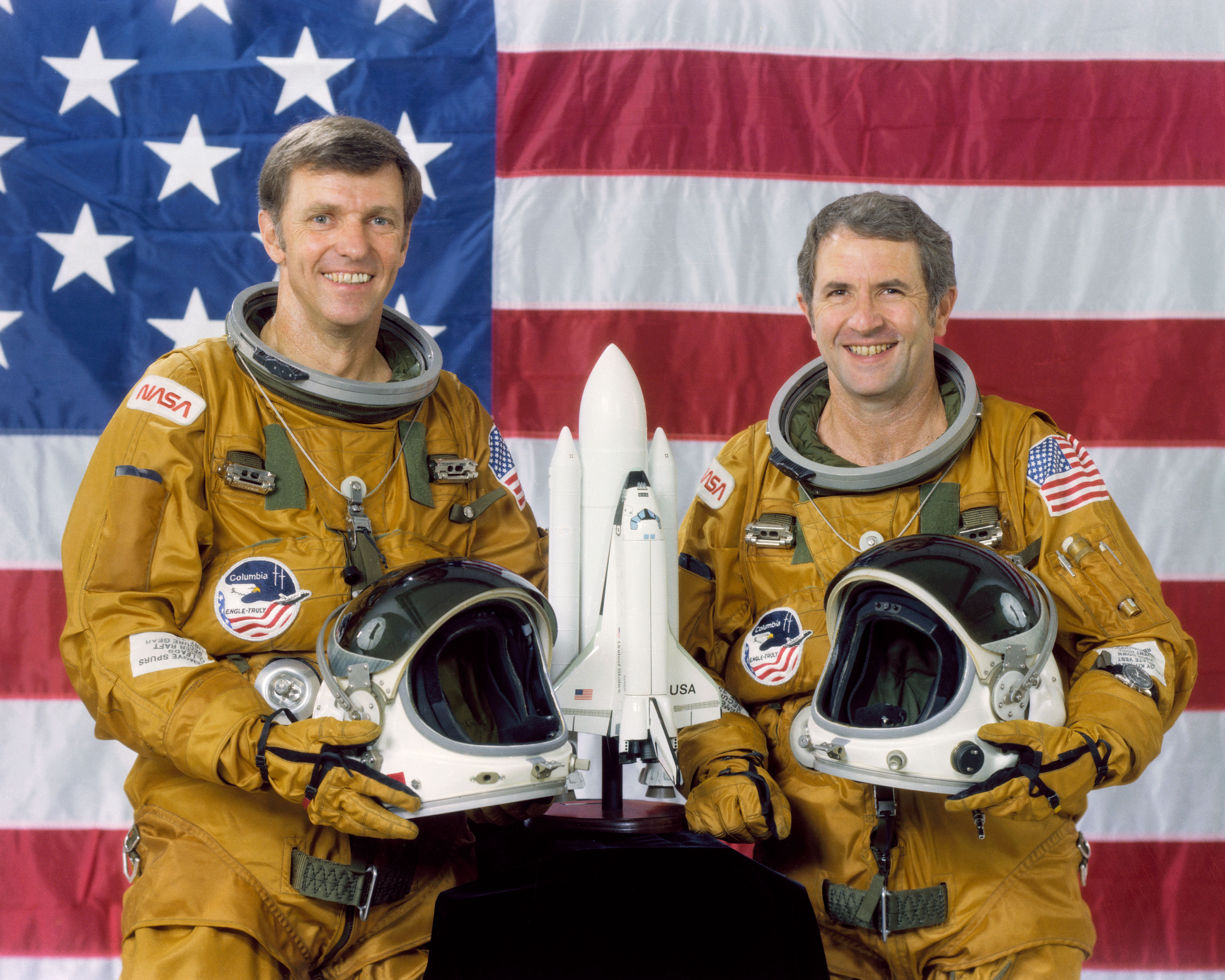
November 12, 1981: Joe Engle and Richard Truly become first people to fly a used spacecraft

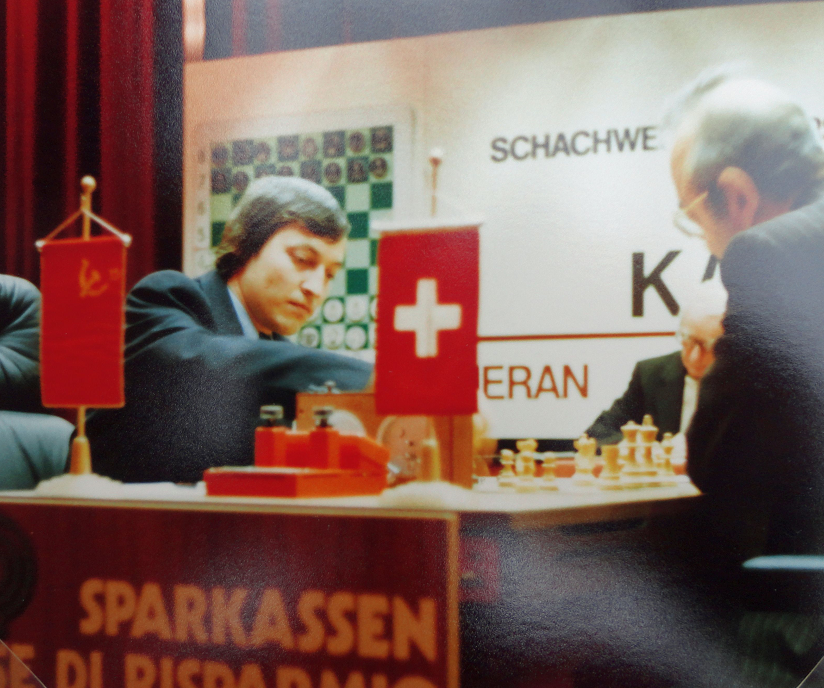
November 20, 1981: Karpov retains world chess championship

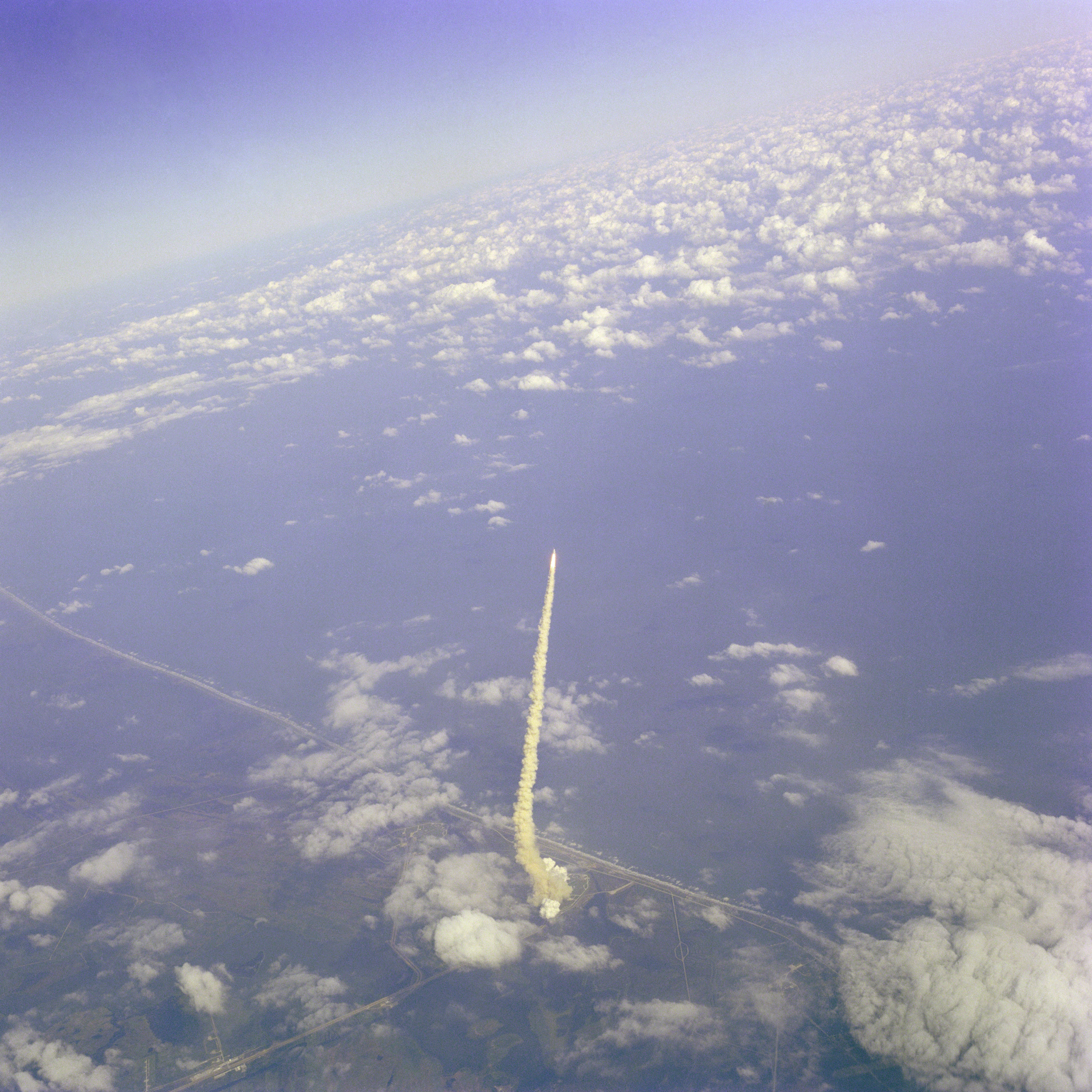
second launch of Columbia

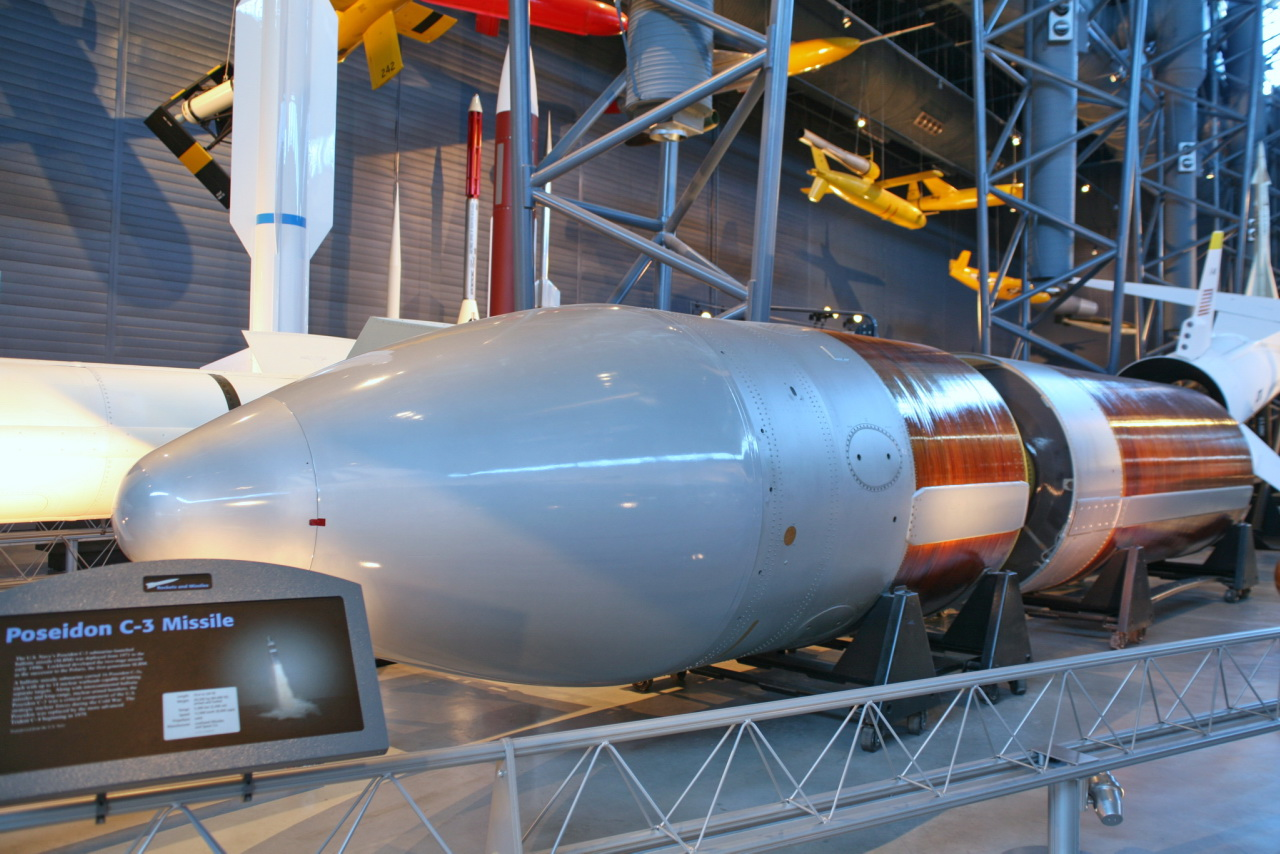
November 2, 1981: U.S. nuclear missile dropped on Scotland

The following events occurred in November 1981:

== November 1, 1981 (Sunday) ==
Antiguan Barbudan flag

- The nation of Antigua and Barbuda gained independence from the United Kingdom. At midnight in St. John's, Antigua, the British flag was hauled down and the Antiguan flag raised in its place at the city's cricket park. Princess Margaret, appearing on behalf of her sister, Queen Elizabeth II, presented the instruments of state to Prime Minister Vere Cornwall Bird.
- Paid maternity leave was introduced in the Soviet Union as part of the 11th Party Congress reforms.
- Born: LaTavia Roberson, American singer (Destiny's Child), in Houston

== November 2, 1981 (Monday) ==
- At the U.S. Polaris nuclear submarine base at the Holy Loch in Scotland, a Poseidon missile slipped from a crane that was transferring the weapon from a ballistic missile submarine to the submarine tender USS Holland. The missile fell 17 feet without incident, although the magazine New Statesman reported in its November 27 issue that the missile had ten nuclear warheads, that there had been the risk of an explosion that could have released a large radioactive cloud, and that the crews had been evacuated. Although the story has sometimes been retold as an incident where "we almost nuked Scotland" and that the fully armed Poseidon missile "did not detonate, but it could have", the magazine itself emphasized that "The risk was not thermonuclear explosion but detonation in the fierce, sensitive chemical explosives of the warhead trigger-system" that would have released a radioactive cloud.
- Born:
  - Tatiana Totmianina, Russian pair figure skater, two-time world champion and Olympic gold medals; in Perm
  - Katharine Isabelle, Canadian actress, in Vancouver
- Died: Kenneth Oakley, 70, English anthropologist whose testing exposed the Piltdown Man as a fraud.

== November 3, 1981 (Tuesday) ==
- High school junior Anthony Jacques Broussard raped and strangled 14-year-old Marcy Conrad, in Milpitas, California. "The unusual, and perhaps more disturbing, aspect of the crime was what ensued in the two days between the murder and the notification of police", an author would write later. Broussard not only bragged about the murder, he took at least 13 of his classmates to see the body before one of them finally told the police.
- Demonstrators marched in Codrington, on the island of Barbuda, the smaller (population 1,200) of the islands of Antigua and Barbuda, in support of secession from the newly independent nation. Hilbourne Frank, chairperson of the Barbuda Council, declared that at least 75% of the people wanted to separate from the more populous (76,000 people) island of Antigua.

== November 4, 1981 (Wednesday) ==
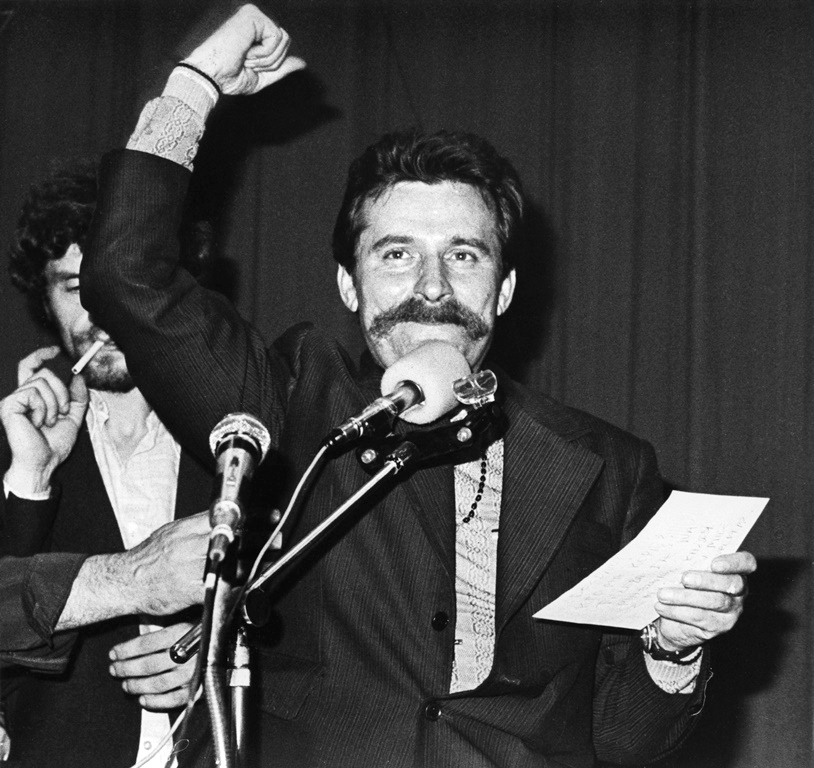
Walesa

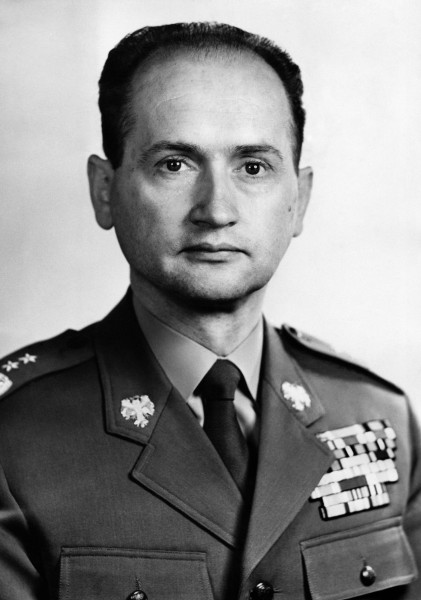
Jaruzelski

- Eagerly anticipated as mankind's first trip into space on a reused vehicle, the second launch of the space shuttle Columbia was called off at literally the last minute. Countdown halted at 00:00:31 when a computer detected an increase of oil pressure in two of the three auxiliary power units.
- Poland's Communist Party leader, General Wojciech Jaruzelski conferred with Solidarność union leader Lech Wałęsa in a meeting arranged by Cardinal Józef Glemp in a last-ditch effort to resolve the labor crisis in that nation. Wałęsa declined to put the independent union under government control, and a crackdown would follow a month later.
- Dr. George C. Nichopoulos, who had been indicted for overprescribing addictive drugs to Elvis Presley (and indirectly causing Presley's death) was acquitted of all charges.
- Hungary applied to the World Bank. It was only the second Communist nation to join.
- The Vietnamese Buddhist Songha was created in Hanoi at the behest of the Socialist Republic of Vietnam, as the only legal religious organization in that nation, accountable to its government.
- After a successful off-Broadway run, Crimes of the Heart began a run at the John Golden Theatre. Playwright Beth Henley, who had been encouraged by friends four years earlier to put her script into production, would later win a Pulitzer Prize for the play, the first of several successful efforts.
- The first transfer of land was made under the Anangu Pitjantjatjara Yankunytjatjara Land Rights Act 1981, as South Australian premier David Tonkin transferred 102,630 km^{2} (39,630 mi^{2}) back to the control of the Australian Aborigines, the aboriginal landholder.
- Born: Vince Wilfork, American NFL player, in Boynton Beach, Florida

== November 5, 1981 (Thursday) ==
- Following an all-night meeting in Ottawa of nine of the premiers of the ten provinces of Canada, an agreement was reached on the Canadian Charter of Rights and Freedoms. Excluded was René Lévesque of Quebec, who was told of the results at breakfast later that morning. The agreement of the leaders of the English-speaking provinces was that the power to opt out of application of an amendment to the future Constitution of Canada would be limited to matters of education or culture.
- It was announced from Buckingham Palace that Diana, Princess of Wales was pregnant and that her due date would be in June. Prince William would be born on June 21, 1982.
- The Glucometer, the first portable meter to measure blood sugar levels of patients with diabetes, was introduced.
- Died: Rangjung Rigpe Dorje, 16th Karmapa Lama, 57, spiritual leader of the Karma Kagyu system of Tibetan Buddhism, at a hospital in Zion, Illinois. There is a dispute within the Karma Kagyu as to whether he was reincarnated as Ogyen Trinley Dorje (b. 1985) or Trinley Thaye Dorje (b. 1983)

== November 6, 1981 (Friday) ==
- What was intended as a "tune-up" bout for WBC heavyweight boxing champion Larry Holmes nearly became an upset when unheralded challenger Renaldo Snipes nearly knocked out Holmes in the 7th round in their fight at Pittsburgh. A powerful overhand right by Snipes sent Holmes to the canvas, and the champ staggered into the post in his corner. Holmes came back into the fight as the count reached 8 and continued. In the 11th round, referee Rudy Ortega stopped the fight as Holmes was hitting Snipes with a barrage of punches, and declared Holmes the winner.
- The government of Sweden permitted Soviet submarine U-137 to leave its territorial waters, nine days after the sub had run aground while approaching the Karlskrona Naval Base.
- Born: Cassie Bernall, American victim of the Columbine High School massacre and subject of the book She Said Yes; in Wheat Ridge, Colorado (killed 1999)

== November 7, 1981 (Saturday) ==
- The skeleton of Saint Lucy, who was martyred in the year 304 and was designated as the patron saint of eyesight, was taken by two masked youths from the Church of San Geremia in Venice, near the Santa Lucia railway station. Saint Lucy and her relics were recovered on December 13, 1981, which coincided with her feast day. Gianfranco Tiozzo was arrested at a hunting lodge in nearby Marcon, where Lucy's remains had been kept by him.
- Colonel Ryszard Kukliński, the Chief of Strategic Defense Planning for the People's Army of Poland, escaped to West Germany along with his wife and children, then flew to the United States four days later. Only after his departure was it revealed that the adviser to General Jaruzelski had been spying for the U.S. Central Intelligence Agency since 1970.
- Died: Will Durant, 96, American historian and co-author, with his wife Ariel Durant, of The Story of Civilization

== November 8, 1981 (Sunday) ==
- In elections in Belgium, Mark Eyskens was forced out of office as Prime Minister of Belgium after only eight months. The French and Flemish Christian Democratic Party candidates lost 21 seats overall, while the two Belgian Socialist parties gained 3 seats, giving the two groups each 61 seats. Wilfried Martens, whose government had collapsed in April, formed a coalition that lasted until 1992.
- Born: Joe Cole, English footballer, in Islington

== November 9, 1981 (Monday) ==
- Edict No. 81-234 legally abolished slavery in Mauritania. Despite bans made by the French colonial administration in 1905 and by the Mauritanian government in 1960 and 1980, the practice persisted, and a report to the U.N. Human Rights Commission by the London-based Anti-Slavery Society estimated that the nation of 1.5 million people had 100,000 slaves.

== November 10, 1981 (Tuesday) ==
- David Stockman, the budget director for President Reagan, was celebrating his 35th birthday when the December issue of The Atlantic magazine reached newsstands with the article "The Education of David Stockman". In the article, based on Stockman's interviews by William Greider, the President's chief economic strategist criticized supply-side economics. Democrats in Congress were quick to cite the article as proof that the President's program would not work. Stockman protested that his comments had been made off the record with understanding that they would not be published. Stockman remained as OMB Director, but with less influence than he had had as an adviser.
- United Nations Security Council Resolution 492 admits Antigua and Barbuda to the United Nations.
- Born:
  - Jason Dunham, American Medal of Honor recipient (killed 2004), in Scio, New York
  - Tony Blanco, Dominican-born Japanese baseball star, in San Juan de la Maguana
- Died: Abel Gance, 92, French film director

== November 11, 1981 (Wednesday) ==
- The USS Ohio was commissioned at Groton, Connecticut. At the time, it was the largest submarine to begin service, and was the first Ohio-class submarine, designed to carry 24 Trident II missiles, each missile in turn capable of carrying 17 nuclear warheads. On December 12, 1981, an even larger class of subs, the Soviet Typhoon class submarine, was first commissioned with the launch of the Dmitriy Donskoy. U.S. Vice-President, and future President George H. W. Bush declared, "If she is successful in her life's mission, she will never fire a shot. Her purpose is to deter enemies of the United States, potential enemies of the free world. Her mission is to preserve peace."
- Fernando Valenzuela became first rookie to win the Cy Young Award, given to the best pitcher in Major League Baseball as voted by the Baseball Writers' Association of America. Valenzuela received 70 points overall based on 5 for first place, 3 for second and 1 for third, finishing ahead of Tom Seaver by the margin of a single second-place vote.
- Antigua and Barbuda is the 157th member to join the United Nations
- Born:
  - Guillaume, Hereditary Grand Duke of Luxembourg, heir apparent to the throne since 2000
  - Natalie Glebova, Russian-born Canadian beauty queen and Miss Universe in 2005; in Tuapse, Krasnodar Krai, USSR;

== November 12, 1981 (Thursday) ==
- The space shuttle Columbia became the first space vehicle to be reused, launching at 10:09 am from Cape Canaveral with astronauts Joe Engle and Richard Truly. It was only the second shuttle mission overall. A failure of some of the fuel cells forced the early end of the mission, and Engle and Truly landed two days later.
- November 12, 1981, had also been the date, planned back in 1969, for the launch of a crewed mission to Mars, based on the expected planning time and the proximity of Earth to Mars and Venus. Cuts to NASA budget in 1970 stopped the project, but the plan had been for a nine-month trip to Mars, with arrival on August 9, 1982; ten weeks of exploration ending with departure on October 28, 1982; a flyby of Venus February 28, 1983; and a return to Earth on August 14, 1983.
- Double Eagle V became the first balloon to cross the Pacific Ocean. After launching on November 10 from Nagashima, Japan with four men (Rocky Aoki, Ron Clark, Larry Newman and Ben Abruzzo) and crossing the International Date Line, the Double Eagle traveled 5,768 miles and landed 84 hours and 31 minutes later in the U.S., near Covelo, California.
- Died: William Holden, 63, American film actor died at his home, apparently after drinking heavily, tripping on a throw rug, and striking his head on the edge of a nightstand. Holden, who had won the 1953 Academy Award for Best Actor (for the film Stalag 17) had been the best man at the March 4, 1952 wedding of Ronald Reagan and Nancy Reagan. His body wasn't found until November 16. Film director Billy Wilder would later comment to the New York Times, "To be killed by a bottle of vodka and a night table! What a lousy fadeout for a great guy!"

== November 13, 1981 (Friday) ==
- The Canadarm, officially the Remote Manipulator System, was used for the first time on the second day of the Columbia mission. Astronaut Richard Truly began the successful test of the robotic arm at 1400 UTC. With a reach of 15 meters, the robotic arm was used in space shuttle missions to bring satellites out of orbit and into the cargo bay for repair, and then redeployment. Designed with a grant from the National Research Council of Canada, and built in Toronto at the Spar Aerospace factory, the device was famous as "Canada's contribution to the US space shuttle program".
- The Tokyo daily newspaper Mainichi Shimbun reported that U.S. National Security Adviser Richard Allen had accepted a $1,000 payment from the Japanese women's magazine Shufunotomo, in return for arranging an interview with Nancy Reagan, on January 21. Allen confirmed the story, but said that he had forgotten that the cash was in his office safe. Though Allen was cleared of wrongdoing, he was asked by President Reagan to resign on January 4, 1982.

== November 14, 1981 (Saturday) ==
- The Reverend Robert Bradford, 40, member of the United Kingdom House of Commons for South Belfast, Northern Ireland, was assassinated by three Irish Republican Army members. Bradford had been at the community center in Finaghy, along with 60 teenagers who were attending a dance. A caretaker for the center was shot and killed as the gunmen fled, and Bradford, an outspoken critic of the IRA, died after being shot six times.

== November 15, 1981 (Sunday) ==
- Abdus Sattar was confirmed as President of Bangladesh in an election suspected of being rigged. Running on the Nationalist Party ticket as one of 23 candidates, Sattar, who had been the acting President since the May 30 assassination of Ziaur Rahman, officially received 14,217,601 votes, nearly two-thirds of those cast, while runner up Kamal Hossain of the Awami League got 5,694,884.
- A force of 100 paratroopers from Zaire, arrived in Chad as the first part of a peacekeeping mission by member nations of the Organisation of African Unity, to maintain order while occupying soldiers from Libya departed. The contingent was followed by troops from Senegal and Nigeria.
- Born: Lorena Ochoa, Mexican-born golfer, in Guadalajara
- Died:
  - Enid Markey, 87, American film actress who originated the role of "Jane" in the 1918 silent Tarzan of the Apes
  - Khawar Rizvi, 43, Pakistani poet

== November 16, 1981 (Monday) ==
- The wedding of Luke and Laura was watched by 14 million households, setting a record, still standing, for an episode on a "daytime television" show. Luke Spencer (Tony Geary) and Laura Webber (Genie Francis) married on the American soap opera General Hospital. It was estimated that 30 million television viewers witnessed the fictitious ceremony.
- C. Everett Koop was confirmed as the Surgeon General of the United States by a 68-24 in the United States Senate. The outspoken Koop would go on to become perhaps the most memorable holder of the office.
- Stephen Sondheim's Merrily We Roll Along debuted at the Alvin Theatre and proved to be a rare flop for the otherwise successful composer and lyricist. The musical ran for only 16 performances.
- Died: Frank Malina, 69, American aeronautical engineer

== November 17, 1981 (Tuesday) ==
- In a meeting of the National Security Council at the White House, President Reagan made the decision to support the Contras, a 500-man force that would fight the leftist government of Nicaragua and protect the right-wing government of El Salvador against rebels.
- The occultation of the star Sigma Sagittarii by the planet Venus permitted astronomers to gather information about the second planet's atmosphere by measuring the decrease of light from the star. The last occultation by Venus of a star had been July 7, 1959, when Venus was directly between the Earth and Regulus.
- Born:
  - Sarah Harding, British singer (Girls Aloud), in Ascot, Berkshire (d. 2021). Her bandmate, Kimberley Walsh, was born three days later, in Bradford
  - Doug Walker, American actor and host of Nostalgia Critic

== November 18, 1981 (Wednesday) ==
- In a speech to the National Press Club in Washington D.C., President Reagan unveiled what he called the zero option proposal, the first attempt to reduce the number of nuclear missiles. Reagan, also announced the term "START" for upcoming negotiations in Vienna, with the goal being a strategic arms reduction treaty, going beyond SALT (strategic arms limitation treaty) negotiations. The proposal was for the U.S. to cancel deployment of Pershing II missiles and cruise missiles if the U.S.S.R. made similar reductions of its arsenal of SS-20, SS-4 and SS-5 missiles.
- Died: Fredric Wertham, 86, German-born American psychiatrist whose 1954 book, Seduction of the Innocent, resulted in a backlash against the American comic book industry and the creation of the Comics Code Authority.

== November 19, 1981 (Thursday) ==
- In Durban, South Africa, African National Congress member and lawyer Griffiths Mxenge was assassinated by four agents of the Vlakplaas, a secret paramilitary unit of the South African Police, directed by Colonel Eugene de Kock and Commander Dirk Coetzee. Mxenge, who was repeatedly stabbed and beaten by four men, was the first of many ANC activists who were killed by the police unit during the last decade of apartheid, including his wife Victoria Mxenge, who was murdered on August 1, 1985.

== November 20, 1981 (Friday) ==
- Reigning champion Anatoly Karpov retained his title world chess champion when challenger Viktor Korchnoi conceded the 18th game of the series, giving Karpov the sixth win in the match, that had started on October 1 at the Kurzentrum playing hall in Merano, Italy. The game had been adjourned the day before. With the game set to resume at 5:00 pm, Korchnoi submitted his resignation of the game to chief referee Paul Klein at 3:15.
- The Canada-U.S. Boundary Settlement Treaty for the Gulf of Maine went into effect, after having been ratified by the U.S. Senate on June 3 and by the Canadian Senate on November 17.

== November 21, 1981 (Saturday) ==
- In the largest anti-nuclear protest to that time, a crowd of 350,000 marched in Amsterdam against the deployment of American missiles in Europe.
- The Gibraltar-registered tanker Globe Asimi ran aground in the Lithuanian S.S.R. port of Klaipėda during a storm, and spilled 16,000 tons of fuel oil in the Baltic Sea, much of which then washed on to the beaches of what was then a Soviet Union port. The Soviet solution for cleaning the coastline was to remove 600,000 tons of oil soaked sand and then to dump it into landfills, where it seeped into the groundwater.
- Died: Eddie Klep, 63, the first white person to play in American baseball's Negro leagues. On May 29, 1946, Klep debuted for the Cleveland Buckeyes in an 8-6 win over the Chicago American Giants.

== November 22, 1981 (Sunday) ==
- The apostolic exhortation Familiaris consortio, referred to in English as "On the Role of the Christian Family in the Modern World", was issued by Pope John Paul II.
- Sri Sathya Sai University, located in Anantapur, Andhra Pradesh State in India, was founded.
- Charles R. Schwab sold his brokerage to the Bank of America for $53,000,000 as the company became publicly traded. Six years later, Schwab would pay $190,000,000 to regain full control.
- Died: Hans Adolf Krebs, 81, German physician and biochemist, 1953 Nobel Prize laureate for whom the Krebs cycle is named

== November 23, 1981 (Monday) ==
- England and Wales were swept by 105 tornadoes over the space of five hours. Normally, the United Kingdom has 30 tornadoes in an entire year. The twisters formed at random along a cold front sweeping from Anglesey to East Anglia, the largest recorded tornado outbreak in European history.
- In one of the earliest controversies that would be cited in the 1986 Iran-Contra scandal, President Reagan signed the top-secret NSDD-17, a National Security Decision Directive, authorizing the CIA to recruit and support Contra rebels in Nicaragua and allotting $19,950,000 funding.
- After 45 years, the New Jersey State Police files on the Lindbergh kidnapping were opened for public viewing. The release of the files had followed a lawsuit brought by Anna Hauptmann, the widow of Bruno Hauptmann, who had been convicted of the 1930 kidnapping and murder of Charles A. Lindbergh, Jr., the 18-month-old son of legendary aviator Charles Lindbergh and Anne Morrow Lindbergh. The materials are now housed at the state police Museum and Learning Center in West Trenton.
- Nurse Robert Diaz was arrested at his home and charged with murdering 12 hospital patients by injecting them with overdoses of the heart medicine Lidocaine. Eleven of the murders had taken place in April at the Community Hospital of the Valley, in Perris, California. Diaz was suspected in as many as 60 other lidocaine related deaths. He was convicted on the 12 counts of murder on March 29, 1984, and sentenced to death, but would die of natural causes on August 11, 2010 at the age of 72.
- U.S. Secretary of State Alexander Haig and Cuba's Vice-President Carlos Rafael Rodríguez met secretly in Mexico City at the home of Mexican Foreign Minister Jorge Castañeda Gutman, to discuss whether Cuba would cease funding of guerilla operations in Central America. The meeting was unsuccessful, and did not remain a secret for long, being reported by the Mexico City newspaper El Pais two weeks later.

== November 24, 1981 (Tuesday) ==
- Typhoon Irma struck the Philippines, killing 408 people and bringing a storm surge that killed another 270, as well as leaving 250,000 homeless. Hardest hit were the cities of Garchitorena and Caramoan.

== November 25, 1981 (Wednesday) ==
- A group of mercenary soldiers, led by "Mad Mike" Hoare, arrived at the airport in Mahé with plans to overthrow the government of the Seychelles. Posing as players and fans of a visiting rugby club, most of the 45 mercenaries had passed through customs, when an inspector discovered that one of them had brought in a prohibited fruit, prompting a search of the other bags. When an assault rifle was discovered, the visitors grabbed their weapons and took control of the terminal, then escaped the country by hijacking Air India Flight 224 to Durban, South Africa, where they were arrested, then released the next day.
- The Declaration on the Elimination of All Forms of Intolerance and of Discrimination Based on Religion or Belief adopted by the General Assembly as UN Resolution 36/55.
- Cardinal Josef Ratzinger, who would later become Pope Benedict XVI, was appointed Prefect of the Congregation for the Doctrine of Faith by Pope John Paul II.
- Born:
  - Barbara Pierce Bush and
  - Jenna Bush, twin daughters of Laura Bush and U.S. President George W. Bush; in Houston
  - Xabi Alonso, Spanish footballer, in Tolosa.
- Died: Jack Albertson, 74, American TV actor (Chico and the Man), stage actor (The Subject Was Roses) and film actor (Willy Wonka and the Chocolate Factory); winner of an Oscar, an Emmy and a Tony award.

== November 26, 1981 (Thursday) ==
- The Senate of Spain voted 106-60 for that nation to join NATO, after the Congress of Deputies had narrowly approved the measure 186-146. Spain would become the 16th member of the alliance on May 30, 1982.
- Born: Natasha Bedingfield, British singer, in Sussex

== November 27, 1981 (Friday) ==
- Bone relics, said to have been those of Sakyamuni Buddha, were discovered by explorers in a cave near the Yunju Temple and 40 miles from Beijing. Venerated by Chinese Buddhists, the Yunju relics are now kept at the Capital Museum in Beijing.
- Born: Nicholas Thorburn, Canadian musician, in Campbell River, British Columbia
- Died:
  - Cláudio Coutinho, 42, Brazilian football manager, in a scuba diving accident
  - Lotte Lenya, 83, Austrian singer and actress

== November 28, 1981 (Saturday) ==
- Bear Bryant became the winningest coach in college football history when Alabama beat Auburn, 28-17, for his 315th victory. Bryant would finish his career the next year with 323 wins, 85 losses and 17 ties. Four years later, Eddie Robinson of Grambling State would surpass Bryant, and would retire in 1997 with a 408-167-16 record.
- The Kibeho apparitions in Rwanda began at a time of increasing tension between the Tutsis and the Hutus.

== November 29, 1981 (Sunday) ==
- Shortly after noon, a car bomb exploded outside of a school in the Azbakiyah section of Damascus killing more than 200 people, many of them children. The blast tore away the fronts of nearby buildings. The death toll, initially measured at 64, rose as additional bodies were unearthed from the rubble. The Syrian Muslim Brotherhood claimed responsibility for the attack.
- In Honduras, voting took place for the first time in 17 years for a civilian President, in the first election in a decade. Dr. Roberto Suazo Cordova, from the Liberal Party was the winner, defeating Ricardo Zuniga Augustinus.
- Born:
  - Tom Hurndall, British photographer and murder victim; in London (killed 2004)
  - María Eugenia Roselló, Uruguayan politician and Secretary of the Uruguayan Senate; in Montevideo
- Died:
  - Natalie Wood, 43, American film actress, drowned in the ocean near California's Santa Catalina Island.
  - T.H. Marshall, 88, British sociologist
  - Dudley Glass, 82, Australian composer, died one day after being hit by a bus in Lambeth in London.

== November 30, 1981 (Monday) ==
- In Geneva, negotiations began for the reduction of intermediate range nuclear missiles, with Paul Nitze and Yuli Kvitsinsky appearing for the United States and the Soviet Union, respectively. The START talks would eventually lead to the signing of the Intermediate-Range Nuclear Forces Treaty on December 8, 1987. "START", an American acronym for the Strategic Arms Reduction Treaty, was referred to in Russian as the "SNV" (Strategicheskih Nastupatel'nyh Vooruzhenij) Treaty
- The Memorandum of Understanding on Strategic Cooperation was signed by U.S. Secretary of Defense Caspar Weinberger and Israeli Defense Minister Ariel Sharon. The MOU lasted only 17 days, and was suspended after Israel announced its annexation of the Golan Heights.
- Died: Ken Horne, the original AIDS patient to be reported to the CDC.
