= Bernard Bajolet =

French diplomat and civil servant

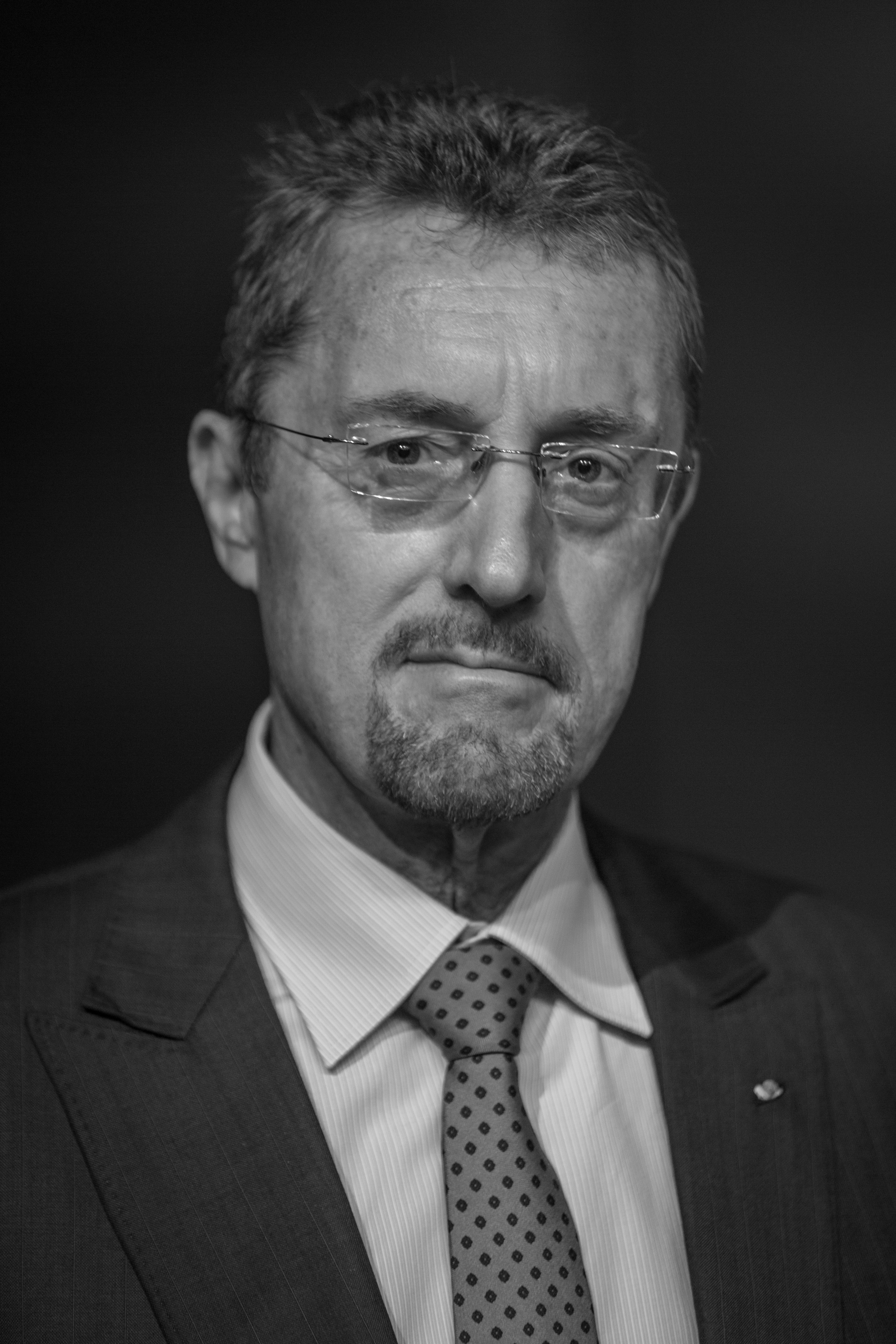

Director of the Directorate-General for External Security
- In office 10 April 2013 – 20 May 2017
- President: François Hollande

Personal details
- Born: 21 May 1949 (age 77) Dombasle-sur-Meurthe, France
- Education: Sciences Po, ÉNA
- Profession: Diplomat

Bernard Bajolet (born 21 May 1949) is a French diplomat and civil servant. On 10 April 2013 he was appointed as head of the French secret service, the Directorate-General for External Security (Direction générale des services extérieurs). He was the French Ambassador to Afghanistan from 2011 to 2013.

== Early life ==
Bajolet was born in 1949 at Dombasle-sur-Meurthe and went to Lycée Henri Poincaré in Nancy, France. He then studied at Paris' Sciences Po, and graduated from the École nationale d'administration in 1975. That same year he joined the diplomatic service.

On 18 October 2022, Bernard Bajolet is indicted for "complicity in attempted extortion" and "arbitrary attack on individual freedom by a person holding public authority", against Alain Dumenil, a Franco-Swiss businessman who accuses the intelligence service of having used coercion to demand money from him in 2016..

== Diplomatic career ==
- 1975-1978: Deuxième Secrétaire and then Premier Secrétaire at Algiers
- 1978-1979: at the Administration centrale (Information and Press for European issues)
- 1979-1981: au Cabinet du Secrétaire d’Etat aux Affaires Etrangères, responsible for relations with the European Parliament
- 1981-1985: deuxième Conseiller at Rome
- 1985-1986: at Harvard University
- 1986-1990: deuxième Conseiller at Damascus
- 1991-1994: at the Administration Centrale, (Directeur Adjoint for North Africa and the Middle East)
- 1991: Special envoy to the Madrid Conference of 1991
- 1994-1998: French ambassador to Jordan
- 1999-2003: Ambassador to Bosnia and Herzegovina
- Sept. 2003-Aug. 2006: Chief of the section of French interests and then Ambassador to Iraq
- Nov. 2006-2008: Ambassador and High Representative to Algeria
- July 2008-Feb. 2011: coordinator of intelligence for President Nicolas Sarkozy as head of the Conseil national du renseignement
- 2011-2013: Ambassador to Afghanistan
