= Pierre-Louis Gabriel Falaize =

French diplomat

French ambassador to Jordan of France to Jordan
- In office 1954–1957
- Preceded by: André Guibaut
- Succeeded by: Roger Lescot

French ambassador to Libya of France to Libya
- In office 1958–1958
- Preceded by: Jacques Dumarçay
- Succeeded by: Pierre Sébilleau

French ambassador to Laos of France to Laos
- In office 1 December 1959 – 1 February 1964
- Preceded by: Olivier Gassouin
- Succeeded by: Pierre Millet

French ambassador to Lebanon of France to Lebanon
- In office 1 March 1964 – 1967
- Preceded by: Robert Barbara de Labelotterie de Boisséson
- Succeeded by: Pierre Millet

Personal details
- Born: 18 August 1905 Reims Marne
- Died: 25 August 1974 (aged 69)
- Spouse: on 26 March 1958 second marriage to Odette Blanc
- Parents: Gabriel Falaize (1893-1956) (father); Marie Genevieve Laville du Fort (1877-1925) (mother)
- Education: Lycée Henri-IV, University of Paris studied law. DipL: Licence en Droit

Pierre-Louis Gabriel Falaize (18 August 1905 – 25 August 1974) was a French journalist, Resistance fighter and Ambassador.

== Career ==
- From 1932 to 1939 he was Political commentator at L'Aube.
- From 1937 to 1939 he was Political commentator at Paris-soir.
- From 1944 to 1948 he was Director of the Cabinet of Georges Bidault (Minister of Foreign Affairs then President of the Provisional Government of the French Republic).
- From 1949 to 1950 he was Director of the Cabinet of Georges Bidault, the President of the council.
- From 1951 to 1952 he was Director of the Office of Georges Bidault, the Minister of National Defense.
- In 1953 he was director of the United Nations Center. In the Middle East, Minister Plenipotentiary, director of the Cabinet of Georges Bidault, the Minister of Foreign Affairs.
- From 1954 to 1957 he was ambassador in Amman.
- In 1958 he was ambassador in Tripoli (Libya).
- From December 1959-February 1964 he was ambassador in Vientiane (Laos).
- From March 1964 to 1967 he was ambassador in Beirut (Lebanon), on 18 May 1964 he was concurrent accredited in Kuwait City (Kuwait).
