= October 1981 =

Month of 1981

<<	October 1981					>>
Su	Mo	Tu	We	Th	Fr	Sa
				1	2	3
4	5	6	7	8	9	10
11	12	13	14	15	16	17
18	19	20	21	22	23	24
25	26	27	28	29	30	31

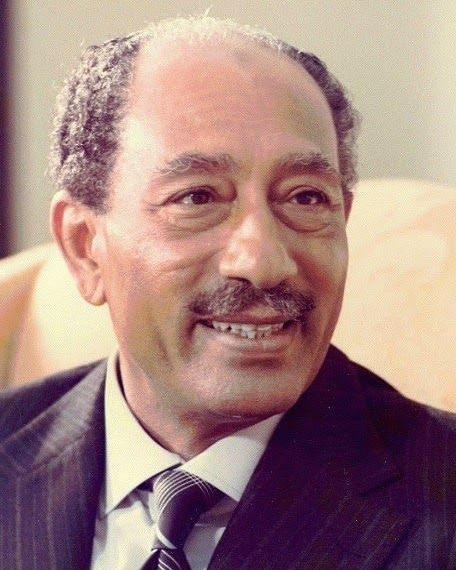
October 6, 1981: Egypt's President Anwar Sadat assassinated

The following events occurred in October 1981:

== October 1, 1981 (Thursday) ==
- The first cellular telephone system was inaugurated. Nordic Mobile Telephone (Nordisk MobilTelephoni, NMT) set up the network in Sweden.
- Eighty-three people were killed and more than 300 injured when a car bomb exploded outside of the Beirut headquarters of the Palestine Liberation Organization's intelligence center. The Front for the Liberation of Lebanon from Foreigners, which the PLO asserted was a front for Israel, claimed it carried out the attack.
- Gunther Guillaume, whose unmasking as an East German spy brought down the government of West German chancellor Willy Brandt in 1974, was released from prison and allowed to cross into East Germany.
- The first five percent of President Reagan's 25% cut of U.S. federal income taxes took effect. The next 10% would take effect July 1, 1982, and the final 10% on July 1, 1983.
- Led by Dr. Paul L. Schechter, astronomers at the Kitt Peak National Observatory reported the discovery of a "hole" in the universe, 300 million light years in diameter, that had only one-tenth of the stars and galaxies found elsewhere. The void, described by Schechter as "exceedingly hard to understand", is beyond the constellation Boötes and encompasses one percent of the space in the known universe.

== October 2, 1981 (Friday) ==
- The Ayatollah Ali Khamenei was elected president of Iran with 16,007,972 votes out of 16,846,996 cast. Education minister Ali-Akbar Parvaresh placed second.
- U.S. president Ronald Reagan announced his plans to resurrect the B-1 bomber program that had been scrapped by President Carter, with 100 of the planes to be built by 1987, and another plan to deploy 100 MX missiles.
- Died:
  - Harry Golden, 79, American journalist
  - Hazel Scott, 61, American jazz singer and pianist

== October 3, 1981 (Saturday) ==
- The hunger strike at Maze Prison was called off after seven months by Sinn Féin, the political arm of the Irish Republican Army. Ten IRA prisoners had died, while another seven had given up fasting. The decision, made by prisoner Brendan McFarlane, ended the fasting for the remaining six IRA strikers. Three days later, Secretary of State for Northern Ireland James Prior announced that some of the original demands of the strikers, including the right to not wear prison uniforms, would be granted.
- Born: Zlatan Ibrahimović, Swedish footballer, in Malmö

== October 4, 1981 (Sunday) ==
- The body in Lee Harvey Oswald's grave was exhumed at the Rose Hill Cemetery in Fort Worth, Texas, to determine whether the corpse was indeed Oswald's. Michael Eddowes, author of the 1977 book The Oswald File, paid the $250,000 expense for the body removal and its examination at the Baylor University Medical Center. Oswald's dental records were examined and confirmed that his was indeed the body in the grave. The examining team wrote a detailed account of the examination two years later.

== October 5, 1981 (Monday) ==
- The last model of the Triumph Motor Company's sports cars, a 1982 Triumph TR7, rolled off the assembly line at Solihull, West Midlands, England.
- In the Washington Post gossip column "The Ear", Diana McLellan outraged former President Jimmy Carter and his wife Rosalynn by writing that "word's around Rosalynn's close pals about exactly why the Carters were so sure" that incoming First Lady Nancy Reagan wanted them out prior to the expiration of Carter's term: "They're saying that Blair House, where Nancy was lodging... was bugged. And at least one tattler in the Carter tribe has described listening in to the tape itself... Ear is absolutely appalled. Stay tuned, uh, whoever's listening." Three days later, the Carters announced plans to sue the Post, and, on October 23, the newspaper printed publisher Donald Graham's apology, which was accepted.
- Raoul Wallenberg, the Swedish diplomat who saved thousands of Jews during World War II and vanished after being arrested by the Soviet Union, was made an honorary American citizen in a resolution signed by President Reagan.
- The first eight-team playoff in Major League Baseball history began as the Kansas City Royals lost to the Oakland A's in the first game of a series to decide the American League West title. Each of baseball's four divisions were decided by matching up the winners of the first and second halves of the strike-torn season. The Cincinnati Reds, with the best overall record in the 1981 season (66-42) did not qualify for the playoffs because they failed to win the NL West in either half of the season. MLB returned to the four-team playoff system for the next 12 seasons, then realigned, with eight teams in the playoffs in 1995, after the 1994 strike season.
- The Reverend Sun Myung Moon, leader of the Unification Church, was indicted for U.S. federal income tax evasion. He was convicted and served an 18-month prison sentence.
- Born: Enrico Fabris, Italian speed skater and 2006 Olympic gold medalist; in Asiago
- Died:
  - Gloria Grahame, 58, American film actress and winner of the 1952 Academy of Ward for best supporting actress Oscar, died from breast cancer.
  - Jud Strunk (Justin R. Strunk, Jr.), 45, American singer and songwriter ("Daisy a Day"), was killed in an airplane crash shortly after taking off from the Carrabassett Valley airport near Farmington, Maine, along with his friend, Dick Ayotte.

== October 6, 1981 (Tuesday) ==
- Egypt's President Anwar Sadat was assassinated at Nasr City while watching the annual Armed Forces Day parade. As a squadron of jets flew overhead in formation at 12:40 p.m., a military vehicle halted in front of the reviewing stand, and six of the men jumped out, hurling stun grenades and firing machine guns. Sadat was hit by two bullets and died at a hospital two hours later. Seven other people, including two of the gunmen, were killed. The four surviving assassins, ringleader Lt. Khaledi Islambouli, Sgt. Hussein Abbas, reserve Air Force officer Atta Hemeida and shop owner Abdel-Hamid Abdel-Aal, as well as mastermind Mohammed Abdel-Salam Farag, were executed on April 15, 1982.

== October 7, 1981 (Wednesday) ==
- Bobby Carpenter, 18, had already become the first hockey player to go directly to the NHL from a high-school team. Twelve seconds into his first NHL game for the Washington Capitals, he set a record with an assist to Ryan Walter for a goal, then later scored a goal himself in the 5–3 loss to the Buffalo Sabres.

== October 8, 1981 (Thursday) ==
- For the first and only time in history, three former presidents of the United States flew together on the same airplane. Richard M. Nixon, Gerald R. Ford and Jimmy Carter, the 37th, 38th and 39th holders of the office, were greeted at the White House by the 40th, current president Ronald Reagan, before flying by helicopter to Andrews Air Force Base, where they departed at 7:45 p.m. for the funeral of Egypt's assassinated president, Anwar Sadat.
- Bobby Unser was again declared the winner of the Indianapolis 500 after 4 1/2 months. He had crossed the finish line first on May 24, but was disqualified the next day for having passed during a yellow caution flag, with Mario Andretti declared the winner. Unser took his case to the United States Auto Club appeals panel, which voted 2–1 to declare him the official winner. He was fined $40,000 but was not penalized the lap. Andretti continued appealing, finally abandoning the case on March 4, 1982.
- OSO I, the first of the Orbiting Solar Observatory satellite series, re-entered the Earth's atmosphere more than 18 years after its launch on March 7, 1962, and burned up on re-entry.
- Maria Cecilia Alfaro of Miramar, Puerto Rico, a 23-year-old Fred Harvey Company desk clerk at Yavapai Lodge, fell 400 feet (120 m) to her death while watching the sunset from the Rim Trail in Grand Canyon National Park.
- Cagney & Lacey was first telecast as a made-for-TV movie, and attracted a Nielsen rating of 42.
- Ted Kaczynski, later exposed as the Unabomber, planted his fifth bomb. The device he left at the University of Utah's Bennion Hall was detected and defused before it could explode.
- Died: Armando Bo, 66, Argentine film director

== October 9, 1981 (Friday) ==
- American rock musician Prince, opening for the Rolling Stones during their 1981 tour at Los Angeles Coliseum, was booed off the stage by an impatient crowd, but went on to a stellar career.
- President of France François Mitterrand signed Law No. 81-908, abolishing the death penalty. The measure had passed the National Assembly on September 18 and the Senate of France (by a 161-126 margin) on September 30.
- A landslide at the Philippine municipality of Maco, Compostela Valley killed hundreds of people. In addition to 194 bodies recovered at the site, 200 miners were missing after the landslide.
- Born: Zachery Ty Bryan, American child actor ("Brad Taylor" on Home Improvement), in Aurora, Colorado

== October 10, 1981 (Saturday) ==
- In the largest protest march in Germany since the end of World War II, at least 150,000 people gathered in Bonn, West Germany to demonstrate against the further deployment of American nuclear missiles in Europe.

== October 11, 1981 (Sunday) ==
- The Super Chicken III, piloted by John Shoecroft and Fred Gorrell, became the first balloon to cross the United States without stopping. The 2,515-mile journey from Costa Mesa, California to Blackbeard Island in Georgia took 55 hours and 25 minutes to complete.
- Died: Brooks Hays, 83, former U.S. Congressman from Arkansas who was voted out of office in 1958 after taking a stand against segregation in schools

== October 12, 1981 (Monday) ==
- CBS Cable, the first venture into cable television by the broadcast CBS Television Network, went on the air in several markets with a series of programs dedicated to the classical arts, with telecasts of symphonies, dance, theater, and operas. The venture was unsuccessful, and CBS Cable was shut down at 4:00 a.m. on December 17, 1982.
- Born: Paul Givan, First Minister of Northern Ireland, in Lisburn

== October 13, 1981 (Tuesday) ==
- Polisario Front guerillas attacked the Moroccan army garrison at Guelta Zemmur, and shot down two warplanes of the Royal Moroccan Air Force, marking a turning point in the Polisario's war to free the Western Sahara from Moroccan control.
- Hosni Mubarak, the vice president of Egypt who had been acting as president after Anwar Sadat's assassination on October 6, was confirmed as president of Egypt in a special referendum, with 9,567,504 votes in favor (98.46%) and 149,650 votes against. He would be re-elected in 1987, 1993, 1999 and 2005 before being ousted in 2011 after 30 years, serving almost three times as long as his predecessor.
- Kåre Willoch succeeded Gro Harlem Brundtland as the prime minister of Norway, following the success of the Conservative Party of Norway in September elections.
- Died: Nils Asther, 84, Danish-born film actor, in Hellerup

== October 14, 1981 (Wednesday) ==
- India's prime minister Indira Gandhi ordered the release of Sikh leader Jarnail Singh Bhindranwale, three weeks after his arrest for the September 9 murder of publisher Jagat Narain. Bhindranwale would be killed in 1984 in the siege of the Golden Temple at Amritsar, and Gandhi would be assassinated later that year by Sikh members of her bodyguard contingent.

== October 15, 1981 (Thursday) ==
- "The Wave" was first led by Krazy George Henderson in Oakland during the seventh-inning stretch of an ALCS game between the A's and the Yankees. Henderson claimed that he had started the wave at "an NHL game in Edmonton in late 1980", while Rob Weller said that he had started it at the University of Washington in an October 31 game against Stanford.
- Born:
  - Elena Dementieva, Russian tennis player, in Moscow
  - Guo Jingjing, Chinese diver and Olympic gold medalist in 2004 and 2008; in Baoding, Hebei province
  - Keyshia Cole, American singer-songwriter and television personality; in Oakland, California

== October 16, 1981 (Friday) ==
- In Japan's worst mining disaster, methane gas explosions at the Hokkaido Steamship and Colliery operation at Yūbari, Hokkaidō killed 93 coal miners. The blast occurred while the men were 1,900 feet underground.
- Died: Moshe Dayan, 66, Israeli general, defense minister 1967–74, foreign minister 1977-79

== October 17, 1981 (Saturday) ==
- Pope John Paul II, spiritual leader of the Roman Catholic Church, met with Abuna Takla Haymanot, the patriarch of the 12,000,000 Christians of the Ethiopian Orthodox Tewahedo Church, at Castel Gandolfo. The Ethiopian church had separated from Rome in the fifth century AD.

== October 18, 1981 (Sunday) ==
- Greek legislative election, 1981: Andreas Papandreou was elected as the new prime minister of Greece as his Panhellenic Socialist Movement party won 174 of the 300 seats in the Hellenic Parliament, while the New Democracy Party of incumbent premier George Rallis fell to 115 seats.
- Stanislaw Kania was forced out as leader of Poland's ruling Communist Party, as the Central Committee of the Polish Workers Party voted 104–79 in favor of his resignation. General Wojciech Jaruzelski was confirmed as the new first secretary by a vote of 180–4.
- The Sultan of Oman decreed the establishment of the State Consultative Council (Majlis al Istishari lil Dawlah), with 43 members chosen by popular election. The new body did not have a legislative function, but was allowed to advise the Sultan in a form of representative democracy.

== October 19, 1981 (Monday) ==
- The Ninth U.S. Circuit Court of Appeals ruled that home videotaping of programs constituted copyright violation, reversing a 1979 decision. The U.S. Supreme Court reversed the appeals court's ruling on January 17, 1984.

== October 20, 1981 (Tuesday) ==
- 1981 Brink's robbery: A group of armed robbers from the Black Liberation Army and Weather Underground attacked a Brink's armored car at the Nanuet Mall in Nanuet, New York, killing one of the Brink's guards and stealing $1.6 million in cash, then killing two police officers who had given chase. Among those captured on the first day was Kathy Boudin, who had been a fugitive for more than a decade.
- Died: Mary Chase, 74, American playwright (Harvey)

== October 21, 1981 (Wednesday) ==
- U.S. Patent #4,296,282 was granted to Joseph T. O'Neil, Thomas M. Quinn and Tse Lin Wang for "Incoming Call Identification Arrangement", more commonly known as Caller ID.
- Born: Nemanja Vidić, Serbian footballer, in Titovo Uzice

== October 22, 1981 (Thursday) ==
- The Iranian parliament rejected President Ali Khamenei's nominee for prime minister, Ali Akbar Velayati. The deputies voted 80–74 against Velayati, with another 38 abstaining. It was the first time in the history of the Islamic Republic of Iran that the Majlis had rejected a nominee.
- The North–South Summit, officially the International Meeting on Cooperation and Development, opened in Cancún, Mexico, gathering 22 heads of state, including Zhao Ziyang (China), F. Mitterrand (France), Indira Gandhi (India), Jose Lopez Portillo (Mexico), King Fahd (Saudi Arabia), Margaret Thatcher (UK), Ronald Reagan (USA), and UN Secretary-General Kurt Waldheim.

== October 23, 1981 (Friday) ==
- Egyptian surgeon Ayman al-Zawahiri was arrested during a roundup of dissidents following the assassination of Anwar Sadat. Zawahiri spent three years in prison, where he was tortured. "The torture broke Zawahiri," noted one author later, "and transformed him as well into an embittered fanatic, determined to inflict deadly harm on Egypt's secular authorities and its Western friends."
- The Spider, the first lunar module to be tested in outer space for docking with a lunar orbiter, fell out of orbit and burned up in the Earth's atmosphere. During the Apollo 9 mission, on March 7, 1969, the craft had been operated by astronauts Jim McDivitt and Rusty Schweickart, a mission that confirmed that a module could carry out the necessary docking and undocking maneuvers needed for a lunar landing.
- Born: Michael Fishman, American child actor (D.J. Conner on Roseanne), in Los Angeles
- Died: Reg Butler, 69, English sculptor

== October 24, 1981 (Saturday) ==
- A weekend of anti-nuclear protests began in cities throughout Europe, as 200,000 marched in Rome and another 150,000 in London to protest the deployment of American Pershing II missiles at bases in five European nations. On Sunday, a crowd of 200,000 turned out in Brussels for the largest demonstration since World War II, and smaller crowds marched in Paris, Berlin and Oslo.
- Born: Tila Tequila, Vietnamese American model and singer, as Tila Nguyen, in Singapore
- Died: Edith Head, 84, American costume designer and eight-time Oscar winner

== October 25, 1981 (Sunday) ==
- Guernica, the classic 1937 painting by Pablo Picasso, arrived at the Prado Museum in Madrid on Picasso's 100th birthday.
- Born: Shaun Wright-Phillips, English footballer, in Greenwich
- Died:
  - Pete Reiser, 62, American baseball outfielder
  - Ariel Durant, 83, American historian

== October 26, 1981 (Monday) ==
- In the worst accident since refugees from Caribbean nations began sailing to the United States, a leaky sailboat with 67 Haitians broke apart in rough seas, half a mile from the beach in Florida. Thirty-four survivors were able to swim to safety, while the bodies of 33 drowning victims washed ashore at Hillsboro Beach, Florida.
- The longest-serving president of Finland, Urho Kekkonen, resigned because of ill health after nearly 26 years in office.
- Born: Guy Sebastian, Australian singer, in Klang, Malaysia

== October 27, 1981 (Tuesday) ==
- Shortly after 8:00 p.m., the Soviet submarine S-363 was caught penetrating Sweden's territorial waters after running aground outside the naval base at Karlskrona. The Swedish government did not allow the vessel to leave until November 6.
- The first reported instance of a pilot being blinded by a laser pointed from the ground took place 700 feet over Encino, California. A 21-year-old man who said he was "testing a laser for a Halloween party" aimed the beam into the cockpit of a hovering police helicopter, leaving the pilot and co-pilot with total loss of vision for several seconds.

== October 28, 1981 (Wednesday) ==
- The Los Angeles Dodgers won the 1981 World Series over the New York Yankees in six games. After dropping the first two games, the Dodgers won the next four, including the clincher, 9–2, at Yankee Stadium.
- The heavy metal band Metallica was formed after Lars Ulrich called James Hetfield, whom he had met through a classified ad in a Los Angeles weekly, The Recycler, to ask his help in recording a song for a compilation album. Ron McGovney and Dave Mustaine completed the group.
- President Reagan successfully lobbied the United States Senate to vote down a resolution that would have blocked the sale of five AWACS radar planes to Saudi Arabia for $8.5 billion. The House had already voted to block the sale, 301–111, on October 14, and 50 senators had co-sponsored a resolution against the deal. Lobbying by Reagan and by the U.S. Department of Defense persuaded five senators to change their minds.
- Born: Milan Baroš, Czech Republic soccer football player, in Valašské Meziříčí

== October 29, 1981 (Thursday) ==
- Near Meeteetse, Wyoming, biologist Dennie Hammer found the first live black-footed ferret (Mustela nigripes) since 1975, when the species was believed to have become extinct. The month before, a dog had brought back a dead ferret, prompting the search. Hammer placed a radio tag on the animal, which led scientists to find other ferrets and led to the repopulation of the species.
- Iranian foreign minister Mir-Hossein Mousavi was elected as the 79th prime minister of Iran on a second ballot by the Majlis, receiving a majority 115 of the 202 votes, with 39 against and 48 abstentions.
- The situation comedy Gimme a Break! began a six-season run on American television, as one of the few new hit shows of the 1981–82 season.
- Born:
  - Jonathan Brown, Australian rules football player (Brisbane Lions), in Colac, Victoria
  - Amanda Beard, American swimmer (Olympic gold medalist 1996 and 2004), in Newport Beach, California
- Died: Georges Brassens, 60, French singer and songwriter

== October 30, 1981 (Friday) ==
- Thirty-eight years after he disappeared while flying a dive bomber, the body of U.S. Navy Lt. Lorne Parker Pelzer and his airplane were discovered in a remote canyon near California's Mount Shasta. Pelzer had been alone in Douglas SBD Dauntless on March 13, 1943 when the airplane vanished in a blizzard.
- Venera 13 was launched by the Soviet Union, followed five days later by Venera 14. The twin satellite explorers traveled to the surface of Venus, with Venera 13 landing first on March 1, 1982, and transmitting the first color pictures of the reddish brown soil on the second planet.
- Born:
  - Ivanka Trump, American model, businesswoman, and daughter of U.S. president Donald Trump; in New York City
  - Jun Ji-hyun, South Korean actress, in Seoul, South Korea
- Died: Lew Jenkins, 64, former world lightweight boxing champion

== October 31, 1981 (Saturday) ==
- Without permission, Tom Crotser dug through walls at Mount Pisgah in Jordan, where he claimed that he and a team had discovered the Ark of the Covenant. Though he did not bring the artifact out, he presented photographs. Biblical scholar Siegfried Horn reviewed Crotser's evidence and, in an article in the Biblical Archaeology Review, concluded that the nails and metal covering shown in photographs were of recent origin.
- Robb Weller led an audience in a performance of "The Wave" at a University of Washington football game in Seattle. Although both Weller and Krazy George Henderson claim to have invented the Wave (with Henderson having led it on October 15), the Seattle event has been said to have popularized it.
- Born: Frank Iero, American musician, in Belleville, New Jersey; Mike Napoli, American baseball first baseman, in Hollywood, Florida
