= List of ambassadors of France to Jordan =

Coordinates: 31.953678°N 35.905353°E

Ambassador of France to Jordan
- Incumbent; David Bertolotti since 2015
- Inaugural holder: Jacques Dumarçay
- Formation: 1948

The French Ambassador in Amman is the representative of the government in Paris (France) next the government of Jordan.

== List of representatives ==
Diplomatic agrément/Diplomatic accreditation	Ambassador	Observations	List of presidents of France	List of kings of Jordan	Term end
1948	Jacques Dumarçay	(E.R.)(* 29 April 1901 in Corbigny (Nièvre)). Son of Henry Dumarçay, Notary, and of Mme, née Louise Gibault. Mar. 7 July 1926 to Miss Elisabeth Tracol (4 children: Jacqueline, Philippe, Viviane, Françoise)	Vincent Auriol	Abdullah I of Jordan	1953
1953	André Guibaut		Vincent Auriol	Hussein of Jordan	1954
1954	Pierre-Louis Gabriel Falaize		René Coty	Hussein of Jordan	1956
1962	Roger Lescot		Charles de Gaulle	Hussein of Jordan	1968
1968	Jean-Marie Mérillon		Charles de Gaulle	Hussein of Jordan	1973
1973	Jacques de Folin		Georges Pompidou	Hussein of Jordan	1975
1975	Dominique Charpy		Valéry Giscard d’Estaing	Hussein of Jordan	1979
1979	Claude Harel		Valéry Giscard d’Estaing	Hussein of Jordan	1981
1981	Jacques Le Chartier de Sedouy		François Mitterrand	Hussein of Jordan	1985
1985	Patrick Leclercq		François Mitterrand	Hussein of Jordan	1989
1989	Denis Bauchard		François Mitterrand	Hussein of Jordan	1994
1994	Bernard Bajolet		François Mitterrand	Hussein of Jordan	1998
1998	Bernard Émié		Jacques Chirac	Hussein of Jordan	2002
2002	Jean-Michel Casa		Jacques Chirac	Hussein of Jordan	2006
2006	Denis Gauer		Jacques Chirac	Abdullah II of Jordan	2009
2009	Corinne Breuzé		Nicolas Sarkozy	Abdullah II of Jordan	2013
2013	Caroline Dumas		François Hollande	Abdullah II of Jordan	2015
2015	David Bertolotti		François Hollande	Abdullah II of Jordan	

.
