= August 1981 =

Month in 1981

<<	August 1981					>>
Su	Mo	Tu	We	Th	Fr	Sa
						1
2	3	4	5	6	7	8
9	10	11	12	13	14	15
16	17	18	19	20	21	22
23	24	25	26	27	28	29
30	31

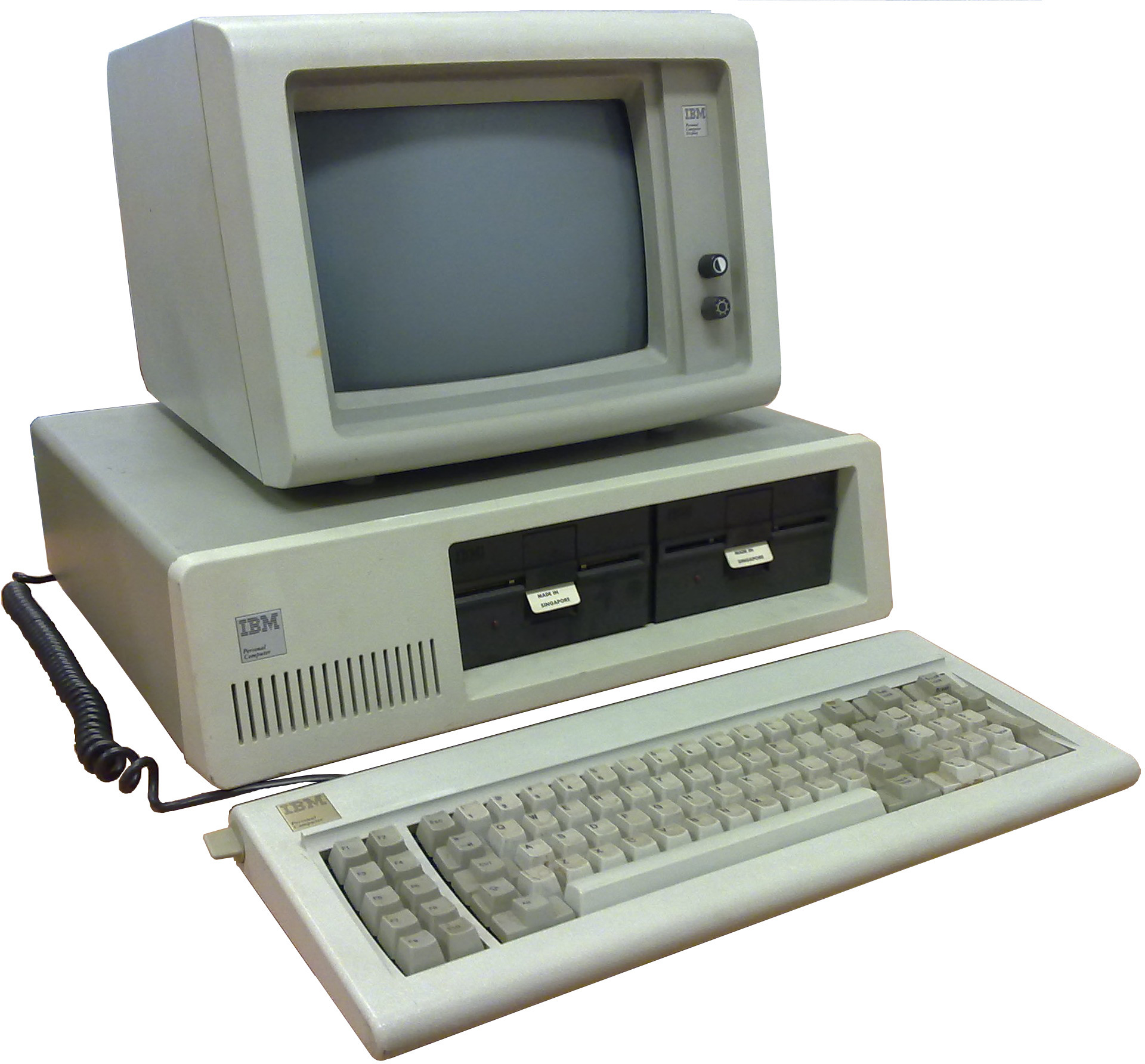
August 12, 1981: IBM PC introduced

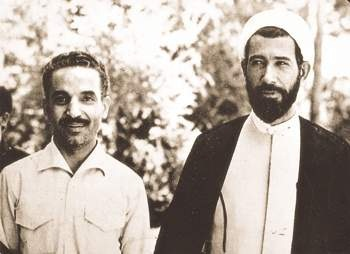
August 30, 1981: Iran President Rajai, Premier Bahonar assassinated

August 1, 1981: MTV cable network begins

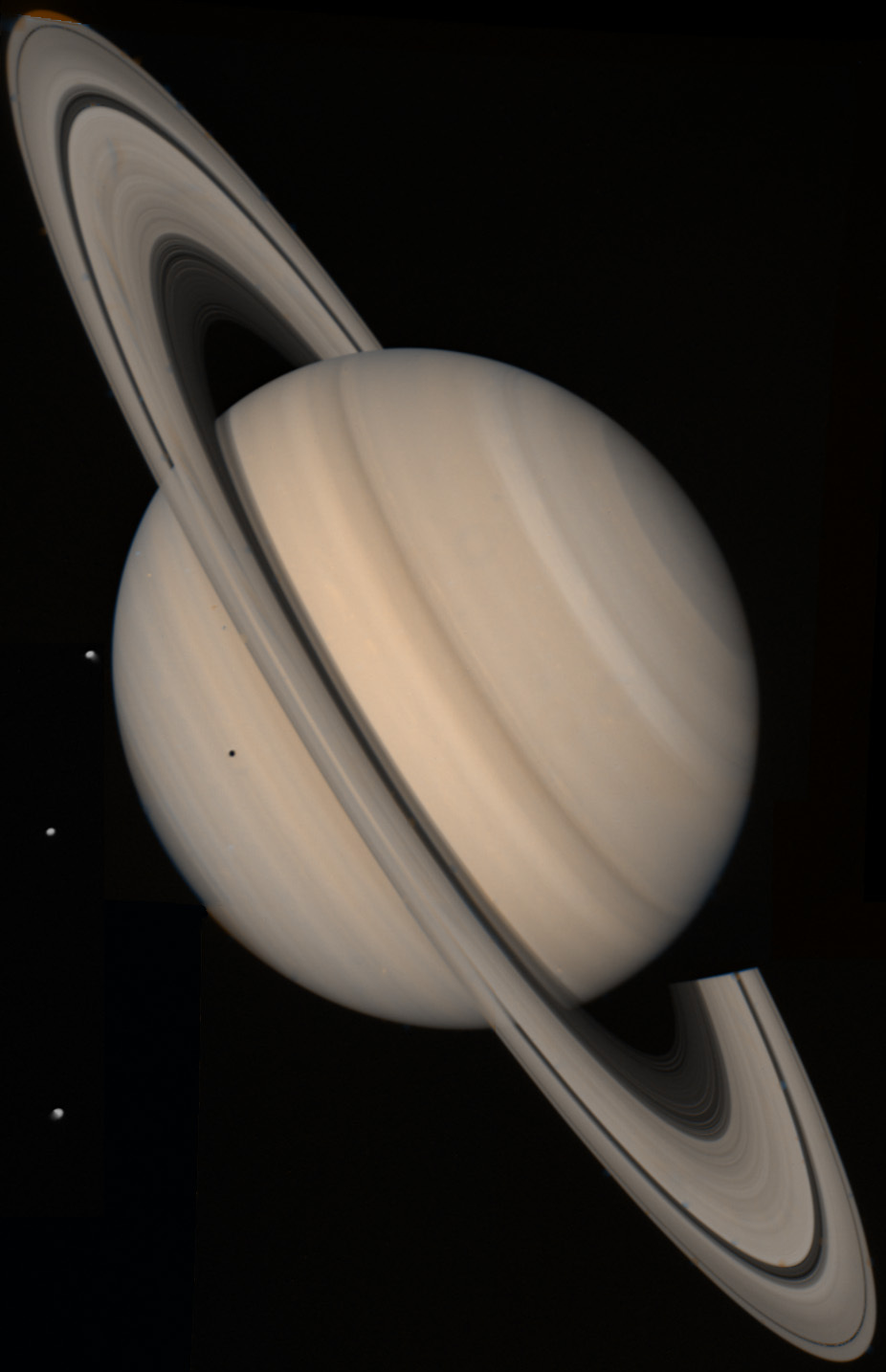
August 25, 1981: Voyager 2 reaches Saturn

The following events occurred in August 1981:

== August 1, 1981 (Saturday) ==
- MTV, the Music Television cable network, went on the air at 12:01 AM from Fort Lee, New Jersey on cable systems in the United States, with John Lack's introductory words, "Ladies and gentlemen, rock and roll." Initially, MTV showed music videos 24 hours a day. The very first selection was "Video Killed the Radio Star" from Buggles. Pat Benatar's "You Better Run" was the second. When it launched, MTV reached 800,000 subscribers and cable television was still in only 25% of American homes. The MTV network would come under criticism in its first 19 months of existence because of its practice of featuring only songs from white musical artists in heavy rotation.
- Abu Daoud, the PLO terrorist who had overseen the massacre of Israeli athletes at the 1972 Summer Olympics, was shot five times at close range while sitting in the coffee shop of the Victoria Hotel in Warsaw. Daoud survived his wounds and lived almost 30 more years until his death at the age of 72.
- Canadian serial killer Clifford Robert Olson Jr., who abducted and murdered 11 teenagers and children (mostly girls) over eight months in British Columbia, was stopped by police after he picked up two young girls who were hitchhiking. He was arrested after the name and address of one of his victims was found in a book in his van. After the government guaranteed to provide $110,000 ($343,885 as of 2023) to his wife, Olson showed police the location of the bodies of victims who had not yet been located and pled guilty to 11 counts of murder on January 11, 1982. He died in prison in 2011.
- In Mexico, a freight train derailment near San Luis Potosi ruptured a tanker car carrying chlorine gas, killing 29 people and sending another 1,000 to the hospital.
- Died: Paddy Chayefsky, 58, American screenwriter and 3-time Oscar winner

== August 2, 1981 (Sunday) ==
- Mohammad Ali Rajai was sworn in as the second President of Iran.
- Lou Cannon of The Washington Post published the first description of U.S. President Ronald Reagan as "The Great Communicator". Variations of the nickname ("communicator-executive", "Communicator in Chief") had appeared earlier.
- Frederick Mellinger, owner of Frederick's of Hollywood, introduced thong underwear to the United States.
- The Hong Kong freighter MV Primrose, with a crew of 31, ran aground on a coral reef during a storm near North Sentinel Island in the Andaman Islands and soon had to radio for help when it came under attack by "spear-waving wild natives". Captain Liu Chung-long sent an SOS on August 10 with a cable saying "Wild island people carrying spears and arrows attempted to board the ship. All crew members' lives not guaranteed. Request assistance and protection urgently, otherwise please arrange air drop weapons for defense." A Singapore tugboat and an Indian Navy landing craft arrived on August 11 to protect MV Primrose. A follow-up message estimated that more than 50 natives were "carrying various home-made weapons and are making two or three wooden boats" and added "Worrying that they will board us at sunset." Rough seas and monsoon winds prevented any possibility of an actual attack before the rescue ship arrived, and a spokesman for the Indian Navy said after the crew had been airlifted by helicopter that there was never any danger and that "It is perfectly normal for the Sentinelese to walk around with bows and arrows. It is part of their dress. At no time was the crew harmed and no time did the Sentinelese try to board the ship." After the crewmen were taken to Port Blair by helicopter, arrangements wer made for them to be flown to Kolkata. Decades later, the story would be embellished on the internet as a "strange mystery".
- Died: Delfo Cabrera, 62, Argentine runner who won the 1948 Olympic marathon, was killed in a car accident in Buenos Aires.

== August 3, 1981 (Monday) ==
- The Professional Air Traffic Controllers Organization (PATCO) went on strike at 7:00 am Eastern Time. The union's demand was for each employee to have a $10,000 annual wage increase, a 32-hour workweek (a four-day week and an eight-hour day combined) and increased benefits. President Reagan, citing the law that prohibited federal government employees from striking, ordered walkouts to return before 11:00 am EST Wednesday or be fired. Of the 16,395 Americans who guided airplane takeoffs and landings, 4,199 stayed on the job. The Federal Aviation Administration (FAA) responded by using a central control station to send clearances to the nation's airports, which operated at 50% capacity.

== August 4, 1981 (Tuesday) ==
- U.S. Patent 4,282,233 was granted to the American pharmaceutical company Schering-Plough for the active ingredient in Claritin, loratadine, although the FDA would not approve the medicine's use until April 12, 1993. By 1999, Claritin would become the top selling antihistamine in America, with sales of $1.5 billion.
- U.S. Marine Lt. Col. Oliver North, who in 1987 would become a central figure in the Iran-Contra Affair and then a conservative commentator, became a staffer on the National Security Council.
- In what was, at the time, the largest corporate merger in American history, the DuPont chemical company acquired majority ownership of the petroleum company Conoco Inc. for 7.8 billion dollars, buying up outstanding stock at 2:45 a.m.
- A day after a rebellion broke out at Santa Cruz, General Luis Garcia Meza was forced to resign as President of Bolivia. He was replaced by a junta led by General Celso Torrelio.
- Born:
  - Marques Houston, American singer and actor; in Los Angeles
  - Meghan, Duchess of Sussex; in Los Angeles
- Died: Melvyn Douglas, 80, American film actor and winner of two Academy Awards

== August 5, 1981 (Wednesday) ==
- By a vote of 130–14, the Majlis elected Mohammad Javad Bahonar as the new Prime Minister of Iran.

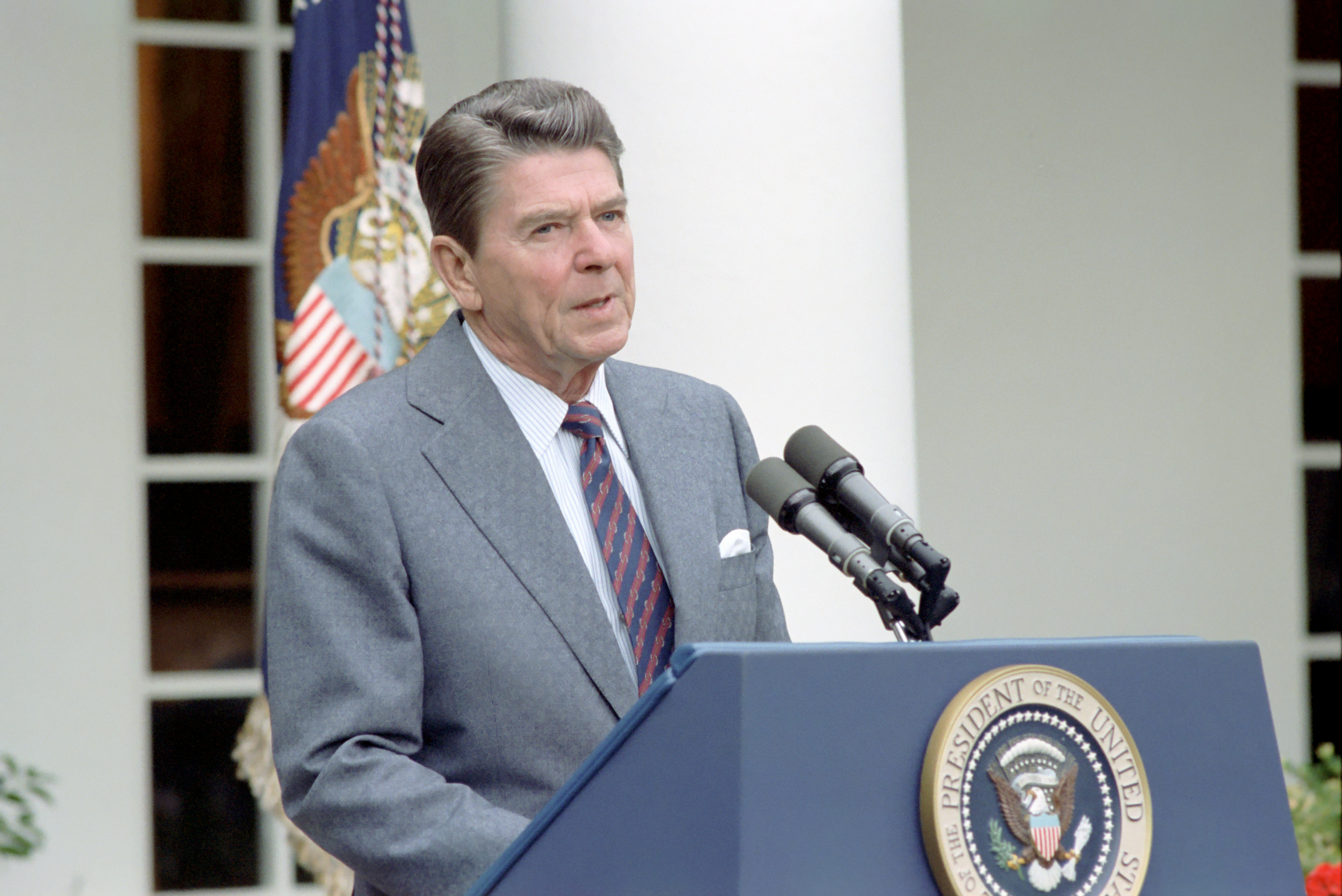
Reagan gives warning

- President Reagan ordered the firing of 11,359 American air-traffic controllers who had ignored his 11:00 am deadline for returning to work. Another 875 who had walked out had come back before being fired. There was no negotiation with PATCO President Robert Poli, and the union was decertified on October 22. Poli himself resigned on December 31.
- The 55-foot (17 m) tall Percheron rocket, privately built by Space Services Inc., exploded on the launch pad at Matagorda Island in Texas. The company started over with a new rocket, Conestoga One, which was launched on a suborbital flight on September 9, 1982.
- Born:
  - Carl Crawford, American MLB outfielder and stolen base champion; in Houston
  - Rachel Scott, American student who was killed in the 1999 Columbine High School massacre
- Died: Jerzy Neyman, 87, Moldavian-born mathematician who introduced the confidence interval for testing in inferential statistics and revolutionized data sampling techniques.

== August 6, 1981 (Thursday) ==
- President Reagan gave the go-ahead for U.S. production of the neutron bomb, with warheads for 380 Lance missiles and 800 on 150-mm howitzers for U.S. troops in Europe.
- France's Communication Minister, Georges Fillioud, announced the end of the state radio monopoly in France and permitted privately owned stations for the first time. Within two months, 400 new stations were on the air.
- Died:
  - Urban Tigner Holmes, 71, American theologian
  - Corradino D'Ascanio, 70, Italian inventor

== August 7, 1981 (Friday) ==
- The Washington Star published its final edition, with the headline "128 Years of Service Ending", and a letter from President Reagan noting, "There is a great silence today in Washington." The last masthead noted "129th year, No. 219" and the paper sold 640,000 copies, double its normal circulation and the largest run in the paper's history.

== August 8, 1981 (Saturday) ==
- The National Aquarium in Baltimore opened after three years of construction and development, becoming one of Maryland's most popular attractions, and spurring the development of other city aquariums.
- General Ne Win, President of Burma since a military coup in 1962, told his followers at the Fourth Burma Socialist Programme Party Congress that he would retire from the presidency effective November 9, but would continue as head of the BSPP.
- Andrea Jaeger won her first major pro tennis title, beating Virginia Ruzici at the U.S. Clay Courts championship final in Indianapolis. Jaeger would go on to win the 1982 French Open and the 1983 Wimbledon title. Coincidentally, tennis star Roger Federer was born on the same day.
- Born: Roger Federer, Swiss professional tennis champion who won 20 Grand Slam tennis titles including five straight Wimbledon finals 2003 to 2007, five consecutive U.S. Opens 2004 to 2008, six Australian Opens between 2004 and 2018, and the 2009 French Open; in Basel.

== August 9, 1981 (Sunday) ==
- Major League Baseball resumed after a 59-day-long strike and the cancellation of 713 games. The All-Star Game, originally set for July 14, opened in Cleveland, and regular games resumed the next day, with all teams at 0-0 for the second half of the season, and the four division leaders at the time of the strike getting playoff spots as first half pennant winners.
- Born: Li Jiawei, Chinese-American table tennis star, in Beijing

== August 10, 1981 (Monday) ==
- Liberia's President, Master Sergeant Samuel K. Doe, who had taken power in a bloody coup d'état a year earlier, had five of his fellow members on the "People's Redemption Council" arrested on charges of plotting his assassination. Vice-president Thomas Weh-Syn and council members Harris Johnson, Nelson Toe, Robert Sumo and Henry Zuo, were part of the Doe's group of 17 officers and soldiers who had overthrown and killed President William R. Tolbert on April 12, 1980. Over the next few days, they were given a military trial, and executed on Friday.
- Francisco Pinto Balsemão threatened to resign as Prime Minister of Portugal unless he received unanimous approval from the ruling Social Democratic Party for his economic reforms. His ultimatum was successful in implementing austerity measures.
- Born: Taufik Hidayat, Indonesian badminton player (Olympic gold 2004, World Champion 2005, in Bandung.
- Died:
  - Jack Kiefer, 57, American mathematician, statistician, and pioneer of optimal design
  - Dušan Popov, 79, Serbian-born Nazi spy who became a double agent for British intelligence

== August 11, 1981 (Tuesday) ==
- The very first AIDS fundraiser took place at the New York City apartment of activist Larry Kramer. In that initial meeting, suggested by physician Dr. Alvin Friedman-Kien, $6,365 was raised, the first of billions of dollars set aside in the 30 years since.

== August 12, 1981 (Wednesday) ==
- The IBM PC was introduced at a press conference at the Waldorf-Astoria Hotel in New York, and with it MS-DOS software owned by Microsoft. Though the product of International Business Machines personal computer was not the first desktop, it was the first designed for the ordinary user to use. The original IBM PC had 16 kilobytes of random access memory and a base price of $1,565. In the first four months, 35,000 were sold, and by the end of 1982, more than 800,000 had been purchased.
- Born: Djibril Cissé, French footballer, in Arles

== August 13, 1981 (Thursday) ==
- On vacation at his ranch near Santa Barbara, California, U.S. President Ronald Reagan signed into law the Economic Recovery Tax Act of 1981, the 25% income tax cut for which he had sought passage.
- At the U.S. Long Course Swimming Championships at Brown Deer, Wisconsin, Mary T. Meagher, 16, shattered her own world record for fastest time in the women's 100-meter butterfly swimming competition, with a time of 57.93 seconds. The mark stood for 18 years until it was broken by Jenny Thompson on August 23, 1999.

== August 14, 1981 (Friday) ==
- The revival of 3D films took place with the United States release of Comin' at Ya!, a "kitsch-laden spoof of spaghetti westerns" which had $13.5 million in revenues in its first months, briefly inspiring other studios to make 3D movies.
- Born: Ray William Johnson, American internet personality and independent filmmaker; in Oklahoma City noted for his popular web series Equals Three
- Died: Karl Böhm, 86, Austrian symphonic and operatic conductor

== August 15, 1981 (Saturday) ==
- The Eternal Word Television Network, devoted to spreading the Roman Catholic faith in the United States and founded by Mother Angelica, made its cable television debut at 6:00 pm Central Time on the date of the Feast of the Assumption. Based in Irondale, Alabama, EWTN was, by 2000, the largest religious cable network in the world, on 1,500 systems in 38 nations.
- Died:
  - Carol Ryrie Brink, 85, American children's author
  - Sir Humphrey Waldock, 77, President of the International Court of Justice

== August 16, 1981 (Sunday) ==
- Three days after setting the mark at 100 meters, Mary T. Meagher set an even longer lasting record for the 200 meter butterfly. Her time of 2 minutes, 5.96 seconds stood until May 17, 2000, when Susie O'Neill recorded 2:05.81.
- The Inkomo Barracks, main arsenal for the Zimbabwe National Army, was destroyed by South African engineers in a series of three explosions over a period of four hours.
- Died: Ervil LeBaron, 56, convicted murderer who had founded the Church of the Lamb of God, died at the Utah State Prison. On the same day, his brother and successor as the church's leader, Verlan LeBaron, 54, was killed in an auto accident in Mexico City.

== August 17, 1981 (Monday) ==
- The Federal Reserve Bank of New York transferred to the N.V. Settlement Bank of the Netherlands the amount of $2,038,000,000 of Iranian assets to conclude the Algiers Agreement that had been reached in January to end the Iran hostage crisis. Of that, one billion dollars was transferred to an interest bearing "Security Account" for payment of future claims made against Iran, and the remainder was transferred to Bank Markazi Iran. Under the agreement, Iran was required to replenish the account if its balance fell below $500,000,000.
- Died: Andrew Zamora, 17, a patient at South Beach Psychiatric Center on Staten Island due to a lethal overdose. His death would spark an investigation by the New York State Department of Mental Hygiene and an eventual ruling by the Supreme Court of the State of New York on his wrongful death.

== August 18, 1981 (Tuesday) ==
- The "FAVOR smoke-free cigarette", invented in 1977 by John P. Ray, received U.S. Patent No. 4,284,089. In 1986, it would be marketed, unsuccessfully, by Advanced Tobacco Products, as medical device for people who wanted to quit smoking.
- Died:
  - Anita Loos, 93, American novelist, screenwriter and playwright, best known for Gentlemen Prefer Blondes
  - Russell Bennett, 87, Broadway orchestrator

== August 19, 1981 (Wednesday) ==
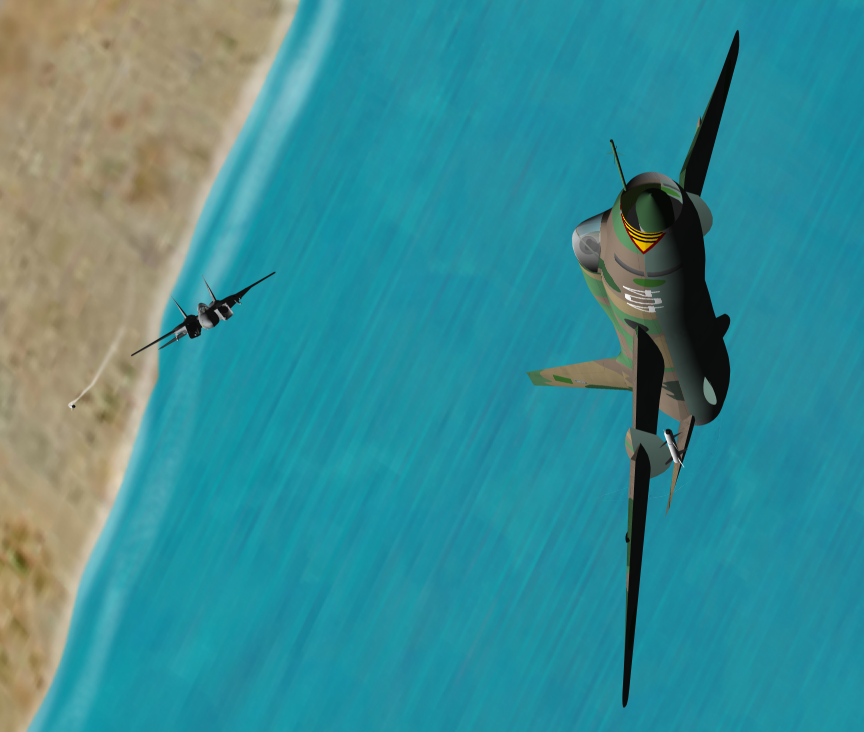
Dogfight over the Gulf of Sidra

- In an air battle between the United States and Libya, Libyan leader Muammar al-Gaddafi sent two Sukhoi Su-22 fighter jets to intercept two U.S. Navy F-14 Tomcat fighters that had taken off from the U.S.S. Nimitz over the Gulf of Sidra. The lead Libyan plane fired an Atoll heat-seeking missile at Lt. Lawrence Musczynski and missed. Musczynski fired a Sidewinder missile at the Libyan plane. Commander Hank Kleeman fired another missile at the Libyan wingman, who had time to eject to safety. Both Libyan Su-22s were destroyed, in the first dogfight involving U.S. planes since 1973. Libya reported that both pilots had ejected to safety, and claimed that an American fighter had been downed. President Reagan was asleep when word got in and was not informed until six hours later.

== August 20, 1981 (Thursday) ==
- Born: Benjamin Barnes, English film actor who portrayed Prince Caspian in two Narnia films; in London
- Died: Michael Devine, 27, the tenth and last casualty of the Maze Prison hunger strikers. Owen Carron, running for the IRA the same day in the by-election for the Fermanagh/South Tyrone constituency that had been held by Bobby Sands, won a place in the House of Commons.

== August 21, 1981 (Friday) ==
- In Las Vegas, Wilfredo Gómez lost the WBC junior featherweight boxing championship to Salvador Sanchez.

== August 22, 1981 (Saturday) ==
- Far Eastern Air Transport Flight 103 suffered an explosive decompression at an altitude of 22,000 feet over the Taiwanese village of Sanyi, Miaoli, killing all 110 people on board. The Boeing 737-200 had taken off from Taipei 14 minutes earlier en route to Kaohsiung. Subsequent investigation showed that the plane had lost cabin pressure on an August 5 flight, and again on a flight two hours earlier. The probable cause was found to have been corrosion of the fuselage floor, possibly caused by the transport in the cargo hold of open barrels of fish preserved in brine.
- Born: Nicholas Mevoli, American film actor and freediver; in Dunedin, Florida (d. 2013)

== August 23, 1981 (Sunday) ==
- Typhoon Thad, Japan's worst storm in 16 years, killed 40 people and left 20,000 homeless in Japan.

== August 24, 1981 (Monday) ==
- South African troops invaded Angola as part of Operation Protea, capturing Xangongo and cutting its water supply. Two days later, Ondjiva was taken. Both sites, located along the border with Namibia, had been used as bases by SWAPO, the South West Africa People's Organization. South African involvement would last until 1988.
- In Tokyo, Sony Chairman Akio Morita introduced the Mavica, which he said "will make conventional chemical photography and development obsolete". An acronym for MAgnetic VIdeo CAmera, Mavica was not the first digital camera, and created an analog image on a videodisk, similar to a freeze-frame on a videotape. The first digital camera on sale was the Dycam, introduced in 1991
- Died: Major General William F. Dean, highest ranking American officer to be taken prisoner in the Korean War. After his capture by North Korea on August 25, 1950, he remained a POW until September 4, 1953, six weeks after the ceasefire. He was awarded the Medal of Honor upon his return home.

== August 25, 1981 (Tuesday) ==
- Voyager 2, launched on August 20, 1977, made its closest approach to Saturn, passing within 41,000 kilometers of the ringed planet. Voyager 2 had reached Jupiter July 9, 1979, and would go on to Uranus (January 24, 1986) and Neptune (August 25, 1989).
- Died: Jack Tyree, 37, film stuntman. Tyree was killed during the filming of The Sword and the Sorcerer. He missed an airbag by 2 feet (0.61 m) after jumping from a 180-foot (55 m) high cliff.

== August 26, 1981 (Wednesday) ==
- A 3-year-old child, Kelly Keen of Glendale, California, was attacked and killed by a coyote in the only known fatal attack on a human by a coyote in the U.S.
- A 52-year-old woman, Mary Lee Ranahan of Scottsdale, Arizona, fell 400 feet (120 m) to her death at the Abyss in Grand Canyon National Park.
- Died:
  - Roger Baldwin, 97, founder, in 1920, of the American Civil Liberties Union (ACLU)
  - Lee Hays, 67, American folk singer

== August 27, 1981 (Thursday) ==
- A team of divers recovered a safe from the wreckage of the cruise ship SS Andrea Doria, which sank in the Atlantic Ocean on July 25, 1956. The safe, from the Bank of Rome, was located in a lounge on the ship's foyer, 225 feet (69 m) below the surface. On August 16, 1984, the safe would be opened on live television as part of a syndicated program, Andrea Doria: The Final Chapter. A large audience tuned in to see the results on 160 stations in 45 countries, and when the safe was opened, it yielded a few thousand dollars' worth of waterlogged American dollars and Italian lire.
- Born: Patrick J. Adams, Canadian-American actor, in Toronto
- Died:
  - Valeri Kharlamov, 33, Soviet ice hockey star, in an auto accident in Moscow
  - Wilhelm Schafer, 72, German paleontologist

== August 28, 1981 (Friday) ==
- For the third time in nine days, the world record for fastest running of one mile was broken. Sebastian Coe had broken the record of Steve Ovett with 3:48.53 in Zürich on August 19. Ovett took the record back on August 26 in Koblenz at 3:47.33, and Coe set the mark again at Brussels, at 3 minutes, 46.32 seconds, a time that would stand until Steve Cram's run in 1985.

== August 29, 1981 (Saturday) ==
- Two men from the Abu Nidal organization fired guns and threw grenades into a synagogue on Vienna's Seitenstettengasse during worship services. Police who were guarding the building fought a gunbattle with the terrorists before arresting them. In the crossfire, two bystanders were killed and 15 others wounded in the crossfire. Nobody inside the synagogue was hurt.
- Died: Lowell Thomas, 89, American journalist and broadcaster

== August 30, 1981 (Sunday) ==
- A bomb planted by Mujahedeen terrorists at the office of Iran's Prime Minister Mohammad-Javad Bahonar killed both Bahonar and Iranian President Mohammad-Ali Rajai. Both had been in office for less than a month. After the double assassination, more than 2,000 Mujahedeen members and sympathizers were arrested and executed.
- Died: Vera-Ellen, 60, American dancer and film actress

== August 31, 1981 (Monday) ==
- The Satellite Music Network went on the air, beginning a new era in radio broadcasting where local disk jockeys were replaced by music programming transmitted from a central location. "Network Radio Is Turning into Satellites", The New York Times, August 2, 1981. The SMN transmitted from Mokena, Illinois 24 hours per day, with breaks for local advertising and news, and served 600 stations before being purchased by ABC Radio in 1989.
- A bomb exploded at the U.S. Air Force base in Ramstein, West Germany, injuring 20 people.
- Born: Joe Swanberg, American independent filmmaker; in Detroit
