= Emmanuel Bonne =

French diplomat (born 1970)

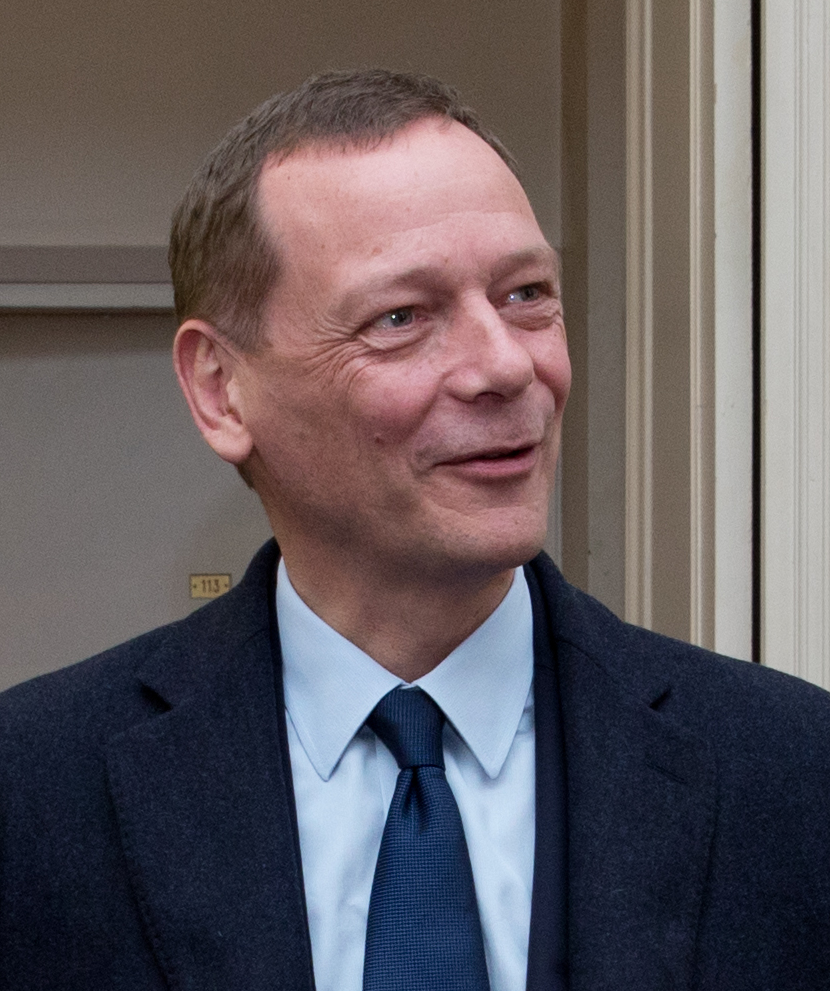
Emmanuel Bonne in 2020

Emmanuel Bonne (French: [emanɥɛl bɔn]; born 13 August 1970) is a French career diplomat who has served as the diplomatic advisor to the President of France since 2019. (Note: The French name of the office of presidential diplomatic advisor is conseiller diplomatique.) During his tenure under Emmanuel Macron he has been playing a role in various matters such as the 45th G7 summit, the Joint Comprehensive Plan of Action, negotiations following the incarceration of Fariba Adelkhah and Roland Marchal in Iran, Nord Stream 2 and the AUKUS pact, as well as in bilateral relations with various countries.

A former ambassador to Lebanon (2015–2017), Bonne is a former political scientist specialising in issues of the Middle East. He was an assistant professor at Marmara University in Istanbul in the Public Management Department in 1993–1994.

== Diplomatic career ==
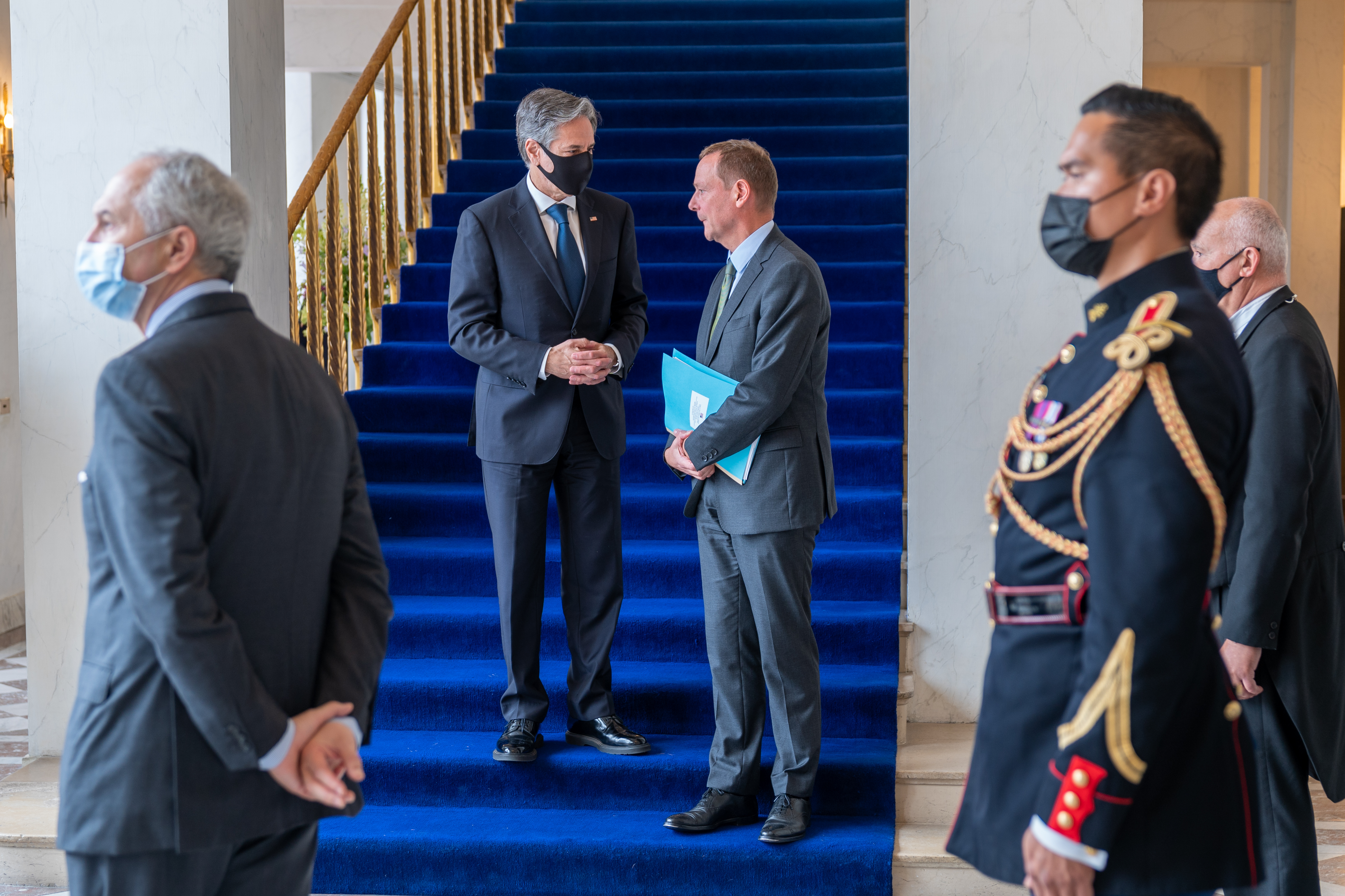
Bonne (third left) with US Secretary of State Blinken in 2021

Bonne is a graduate of the Grenoble Institute of Political Studies with a diplôme d'études approfondies in comparative politics. After working as a researcher at the CERMOC in Beirut he was admitted to the competitive examination as a Conseiller des affaires étrangères du cadre d'Orient in March 2000. Thereafter he has held several positions and diplomatic ranks:

- 2000–2003: Rédacteur at the Central Administration (North Africa and Middle East)
- 2003–2006: Deuxième conseiller in Tehran
- 2006–2009: Premier conseiller in Riyadh
- 2009–2012: Deuxième conseiller at the Permanent Mission of France to the United Nations
- 2012–2015: Advisor for North Africa and the Middle East in the cellule diplomatique (Note: The diplomatic cell or cellule diplomatique is a group of about a dozen presidential diplomatic staff.)
- 2015–2017: Ambassador to Lebanon
- 2017–2019: Directeur de cabinet of the Minister for Europe and Foreign Affairs

== Publications ==
- Bonne, Emmanuel (1995). Vie publique, patronage et clientèle: Rafic Hariri à Saïda. Les Cahiers de l’IREMAM (in French). Aix-en-Provence: Institut de recherches et d'études sur le monde arabe et musulman. doi:10.4000/books.iremam.2811. ISBN 9782821830165. OCLC 911492452.

== Awards ==
- Honour medal of Foreign Affairs (2004)
- Officer of the National Order of the Cedar (2017)
