= Louis Delamare =

French diplomat (1921–1981)

Ambassador of France to Lebanon
- In office 1979 – 4 September 1981
- Preceded by: Hubert Argod
- Succeeded by: Paul-Marc Henry

Ambassador of France to Benin
- In office 1969–1972
- Preceded by: Guy Georgy
- Succeeded by: Michel Van Grevenynghe

Personal details
- Born: 12 November 1921 Trouville-sur-Mer, France
- Died: 4 September 1981 (age 59) West Beirut, Lebanon
- Cause of death: Assassination
- Education: École libre des sciences politiques École nationale d'administration

Louis Delamare (French pronunciation: [lwi d(ə)lamaʁ]; 12 November 1921 – 4 September 1981) was a French diplomat. He was ambassador of France to Benin from 1969 to 1972 and to Lebanon from 1979 until his assassination in 1981.

== Early life ==
Louis Delamare was born on 12 November 1921, in the commune of Trouville-sur-Mer, Normandy. He studied at the École nationale d'administration.

== Career ==
Delamare worked in various positions within the administration of the Ministry of foreign affairs from 1961 to 1963 and then as technical advisor to the office of the Minister of Foreign Affairs in 1966 until 1967. He was appointed director of the cabinet of the Minister of Information in April 1967 and was member of the board of directors of the Office de Radiodiffusion Télévision Française (ORTF). In 1969 he was appointed French ambassador to Benin until 1972.

== Death ==
In August 1979, he was appointed French ambassador to Lebanon and resided in Beirut at the time of the Lebanese Civil War. He was assassinated in a possible kidnapping attempt on 4 September 1981, when a white BMW carrying four gunmen pulled in front of the ambassador's Peugeot 604 on the road leading to his residence in the predominantly Islamic West Beirut. The gunmen tried to open the doors of the Peugeot, but failing that they opened fire through the right rear window and escaped in their BMW. Delamare sustained several bullet wounds in the head and body and died at Barbir Hospital during his operation. Delamare's body was repatriated to France the next day to be buried in Tourgéville.

== Personal life ==
Delamare was married and had 4 children. His wife Françoise died in 2005.
