= December 1980 =

Month of 1980

<<	December 1980					>>
Su	Mo	Tu	We	Th	Fr	Sa
	1	2	3	4	5	6
7	8	9	10	11	12	13
14	15	16	17	18	19	20
21	22	23	24	25	26	27
28	29	30	31

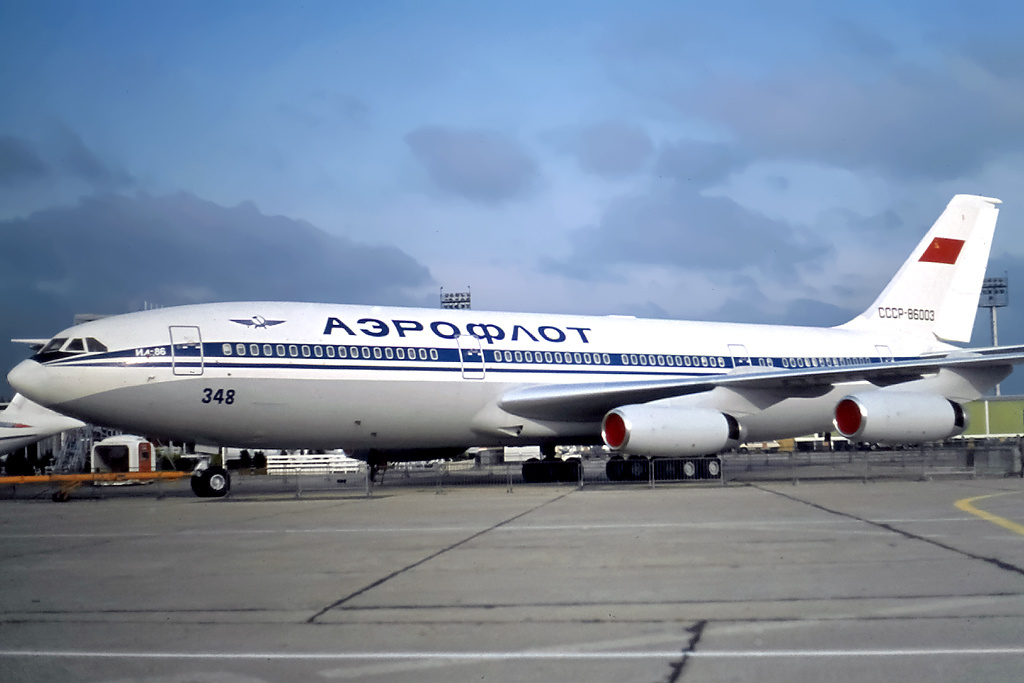
December 26, 1980: The Soviet Union's first "jumbo jet", the Il-86, begins service

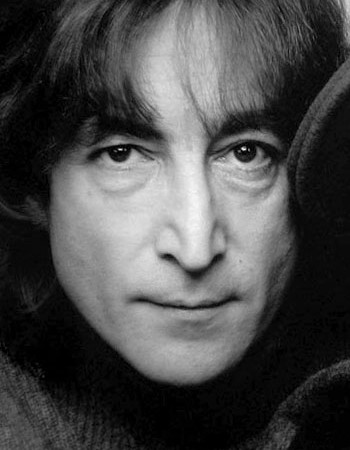
December 8, 1980: Former Beatle John Lennon shot to death by stalker

The following events happened in December 1980:

December 4, 1980: Resettled Xhosa people granted nominal independence by South Africa as "Republic of Ciskei"

== December 1, 1980 (Monday) ==
- South Korea began color television broadcasting, introduced by the public Korean Broadcasting System (KBS) with the inauguration of its second network, "KBS2" on Channel 7. Until then, South Korean manufacturers like Samsung were on their way to becoming one of the world's major producers of color television monitors but unable to sell them at home. The restriction was only lifted by the government on August 1.
- Popular Czechoslovak vocalist Marika Gombitová was paralyzed after being seriously injured in a car accident while being driven to one of her band's concerts. The car she was in went out of control as she was traveling from Brno to Bratislava and flipped over multiple times near Hustopeče. Despite her disability, Gombitova would return to recording and performing concerts and remained popular in Slovakia and in the Czech Republic after the breakup of Czechoslovakia.
- Bravo, a cable television network acquired in 2001 by NBC, was launched in the United States as a channel "devoted exclusively to the performing arts", starting at 8:00 in the evening with its own news program, Bravo Magazine, followed by a tribute to composer Aaron Copland. Initially, Bravo's programming was available only on Sundays and Mondays, from 8:00 pm to 2:00 am.
- The city of Poway, California, a suburb of San Diego, was incorporated after a November 4 approval by the voters in the unincorporated area of San Diego County. As of 2020, Poway has a population of almost 50,000. The city of Santee, California, another San Diego suburb, was incorporated on the same day.

== December 2, 1980 (Tuesday) ==
- A missionary (Jean Donovan) and three Roman Catholic nuns (Maura Clarke, Ita Ford, Dorothy Kazel), all Americans, were raped and murdered by members of the El Salvador National Guarda military death squad in El Salvador while doing charity work during that country's civil war. The four were returning home from the airport when they were stopped and executed by five guardsmen at a secluded spot. The bodies of the four Americans were discovered two days later, and a local judge had signed an order for their burial without notifying anyone.
- The Alaska National Interest Lands Conservation Act (ANILA) was signed into law by U.S. President Jimmy Carter, adding more than 68,000 square miles (180,000 km^{2}) of Alaskan land to double the area covered by the U.S. National Park Service.
- The Central Committee of Poland's ruling Communist party, the Polish United Workers' Party, dismissed four members of the Party's Politburo who had urged retaliation against the Solidarity Union. Wladyslaw Kruczek, General Stanislaw Kowalczyk, Alojzy Karkoszka and Andrzej Werblan, who had been supporters of former General Secretary Edward Gierek (who had been fired on September 6), were replaced by people loyal to the new General Secretary, Stanislaw Kania.
- Journalist Robert Dreyfuss became the first person to suggest the "October Surprise", a link between Ronald Reagan's presidential campaign and the decision by the government of Iran to prolong the Iran Hostage Crisis until after the U.S. presidential election. Dreyfuss made the allegation in his article, "Strange diplomacy in Iran", in a magazine published by left-wing political activist Lyndon LaRouche, Executive Intelligence Review.
- Died: Romain Gary, 66, French novelist and diplomat, died from a self-inflicted gunshot wound.

== December 3, 1980 (Wednesday) ==
- Bernardine Dohrn and Bill Ayers, fugitives from the leftist militant group Weather Underground, turned themselves in at the U.S. District Attorney's office in Chicago after having been fugitives for more than 11 years. During much of the 1970s, Dohrn and Ayers lived together in Chicago under the aliases Christine Douglas and Anthony J. Lee, respectively. Dohrn later became a professor at the Northwestern University School of Law, while Ayers became a distinguished professor of education at the University of Illinois at Chicago.
- The Kaidun meteorite impacted in South Yemen on the grounds of a Soviet Army base near Al-Khuraybah. Most of the meteorite had burned up as it passed through Earth's atmosphere, but a stone weighing 2 kilograms (4.4 lb) was recovered from an impact pit.
- Born: Anna Chlumsky, American actress; in Proviso Township, Cook County, Illinois
- Died: Sir Oswald Mosley, 84, former British MP who founded and led the British Union of Fascists, died in exile in France.

== December 4, 1980 (Thursday) ==
- In the Gang of Four trial in Beijing, the widow of the late Chairman Mao Zedong, Jiang Qing, confessed on the witness stand that she had ordered the 1968 persecution of China's head of state Liu Shaoqi during the Cultural Revolution. Liu had been expelled from the Chinese Communist Party and was imprisoned and tortured, before dying of pneumonia the following year. Liu's widow, Wang Guangmei, had spent more than 10 years in solitary confinement until being released after the death of Mao.

The Ciskei flag

- Speakers of the Xhosa language in South Africa voted in favor of making their area the semi-independent Republic of Ciskei, the fourth of South Africa's Bantustans or "homelands". With a capital at Kingwilliamstown, Ciskei would have a population of two million people, of which only 600,000 lived within its boundaries. The 1.4 million non-white designated people who lived and worked in the "white areas" outside of Ciskei were declared no longer eligible for South African citizenship, but would still be entitled to the limited residential and employment rights that had been set aside by the South African government for non-whites classified as black or as mix-race coloured. The nominally independent nation would exist until April 27, 1994, and then be re-incorporated into South Africa as apartheid gave way to majority rule. Ciskei and the other Xhosa-speaking Bantustan, Transkei, are now part of the Eastern Cape Province.
- Portugal's Prime Minister Francisco de Sá Carneiro was killed in a plane crash along with Defense Minister Adelino Amaro da Costa and five other people. Sá Carneiro had been on his way to Porto to campaign for General Antonio Soares Carneiro, three days before the presidential election in which Antonio Ramalho Eanes was running for a second term. The twin engine Cessna 421 crashed into a house in Camarate shortly after taking off from Portela Airport in Lisbon. Initially ruled to be an accident, the crash would later become the subject of several murder investigations. The statute of limitations having expired on criminal charges in 2005, several people have come forward saying that they were part of a conspiracy to assassinate Sá Carneiro and da Costa by planting a bomb on the aircraft.
- A hotel fire killed 26 people, all of whom were of the top executives for Arrow Electronics Corporation and Nestlé USA, Inc., the American subsidiary of the Swiss-based conglomerate Nestlé SA. The group was meeting in a conference room on the third floor of the Stouffer's Inn in West Harrison, New York. Seven victims were found in a walk-in closet that they had confused for a fire exit during their escape, and three others were located at a fire exit that had been locked with a deadbolt.
- The British rock band Led Zeppelin officially broke up two months after the death of drummer John Bonham, who died on September 25, 1980, by pulmonary aspiration. The band announced, "We wish it to be known that the loss of our dear friend and the deep respect we have for his family, together with the sense of undivided harmony felt by ourselves and our manager, have led us to decide that we could not continue as [we] were." Although the guest bedrooms had sprinkler systems, the same feature had not been installed in the conference rooms.
- One of the most popular films of 1981, Superman II, was first shown in theaters as it premiered in Australia. Sydney Morning Herald critic Meaghan Morris recommended that viewers see the film "in a hurry before some insensitive soul tells you all and spoils the surprises", and praised it for allowing Superman to "come to terms with his sexuality" and for its "series of hilarious one-liners" to help make the adventure saga "one of the funniest films of the year". With Christopher Reeve reprising his dual role as Clark Kent and Superman, the film would be released in the UK four months later on April 9, and in the United States on June 19, 1981.
- In the small town of Saxonburg, Pennsylvania, police chief Gregory B. Adams was shot and then beaten to death by Donald Eugene Webb after pulling him over in a parking lot. The killing was only the second in the history of Saxonburg and the first there since 1942. Webb was then placed on the FBI's 10 Most Wanted List, remaining there for more than 25 years, but was never apprehended. In 2017, Webb's remains were found in Dartmouth, New Hampshire at the home of his wife, who had kept him hidden until he died of a stroke on December 30, 1999. Before dying, Adams had managed to permanently disfigure Webb's face and to give his killer a compound fracture that failed to heal properly.
- Died: Don "Jeep" Warrington, 32, Canadian Football League running back, died two days after being fatally injured in a car crash near Sherwood Park, Alberta.

== December 5, 1980 (Friday) ==
- The leaders of the seven Warsaw Pact nations held an emergency meeting in Moscow to discuss solutions to the problems with the challenge to the Communist government in Poland, including a review of the recent shakeup in the Polish United Workers' Parties. After questioning Poland's leader Stanislaw Kania, the Soviet Union and the other six nations elected not to intervene. An official government statement said the nations "expressed confidence that Communists, the working class, and the working people of fraternal Poland will be able to overcome the president difficulties and will assure the country's development along the socialist path" and added that "the Polish people can firmly count on the fraternal solidarity and support of the Warsaw Treaty countries... Poland has been, is and will remain a socialist state, a firm link in the commonwealth of socialism."
- Died:
  - Michael J. Halberstam, 48, American heart surgeon and novelist, was shot and killed by a burglar at his home in Great Falls, Virginia. Halberstam and his wife had come home to find Bernard C. Welch, Jr., burglarizing their house. Mortally wounded, Dr. Halberstam tried to drive himself to the hospital and even struck Welch with his car after recognizing him. Taken by ambulance to Sibley Memorial Hospital in Washington, Halberstam died on the operating table. A search of Welch's expensive Great Falls home (for which he paid $245,000 in cash) found that he had garnered four million dollars' worth of stolen goods that he had gotten from burglarizing the homes of wealthy people.
  - Stella Walsh, 69, Polish-born American sprinter who won a gold medal for Poland in the 1932 Olympics, was shot and killed in the parking lot of a discount store in Cleveland. Originally named Stanislawa Walaslewicz, she had lived in the U.S. since the age of 2 and became a citizen in 1947.

== December 6, 1980 (Saturday) ==
- In elections for both houses of parliament in Taiwan, voters approved the ruling Kuomintang candidates for 58 of the 70 seats at stake in the lower house and 65 of the 76 in the National Assembly. The remaining 27 seats in the lower house were already occupied by Kuomintang representatives.
- Intelsat V F-2 (International Telecommunications Satellite), the first of a new generation of communications satellites, was launched toward a geostationary orbit from Cape Canaveral.
- President's Rule ended in the Indian state of Assam after a year, and Prime Minister Indira Gandhi installed Anwara Taimor, a local candidate of her choice, as the state's new Chief Minister.
- Okunade Sijuwade of Nigeria was crowned as King Olubuse II, the new traditional ruler of the Yoruba language speakers of the Kingdom of Ife in Nigeria. He succeeded the late Adesoji Aderemi, who had been the Ooni of Ife since 1930, and reigned almost 35 years before his death in July 2015.

== December 7, 1980 (Sunday) ==
- President Antonio Ramalho Eanes of Portugal won re-election to a second four-year term, receiving more than 56 percent of the vote against six challengers. General António Soares Carneiro, who had hoped to secure a runoff election by preventing Ramalho Eanes from receiving a majority of the vote, won slightly more than 40%.
- A Pan American World Airways 747 jumbo jet landed at Beijing shortly after 10:00 in the evening local time, marking the beginning of commercial air service between the United States and the People's Republic of China, and the first U.S. commercial flight to mainland China since the 1949 revolution that had brought the Communists to power.
- Died: Darby Crash (born Jan Paul Beahm), 22, American punk rock singer with the band The Germs, committed suicide by an intentional overdose of heroin.

== December 8, 1980 (Monday) ==
- John Lennon of the Beatles was murdered as he was returning home to the Dakota, a famed apartment building in New York City. Lennon and his wife, Yoko Ono, had stepped out of a limousine and walked toward the building's entrance when Mark David Chapman shot him four times in the back. Six hours earlier, Lennon had autographed a copy of his new album, Double Fantasy at Chapman's request. Chapman remained at the scene and let police take him into custody. Lennon was pronounced dead on arrival at Roosevelt Hospital.
- The first U.S. franchise of the Mexican restaurant chain El Pollo Loco opened across the street from MacArthur Park in Los Angeles. The successful chain has 500 locations in the southwestern United States, and its original parent company operates about 50 Pollo Loco restaurants in Mexico.
- The politically-themed comic strip Bloom County made its nationally-syndicated debut, as a feature in The Washington Post and other papers in the syndicate. Author Berke Breathed would retire the popular strip on August 6, 1989, and, after attempts to place some of the characters in a two shorter-lived features, Outland and Opus, before reviving Bloom County as an internet feature.

== December 9, 1980 (Tuesday) ==
- Hopes that Poland might become an oil-producing nation were put to an end by the explosion of an oil exploration rig in the village of Krzywoploty, near the town of Karlino. After geologists had discovered oil deposits near the Baltic Sea, in the late 1970s, drilling began to determine whether Poland would have a new resource that would rescue its distressed economy. As the drilling at the "Daszewo-1" site reached a depth of 2,782 metres (9,127 ft), a gusher of oil and natural gas erupted and then caught fire and then took firefighting crews more than a month to extinguish. The oil pool beneath the Karlino fields was much less than expected and about two-thirds of it had been destroyed by fire. Eventually, the well yielded only 850 tons of oil, less than 6,000 barrels.
- Born: Simon Helberg, American comedian and TV actor best known for The Big Bang Theory; in Los Angeles

== December 10, 1980 (Wednesday) ==
- The first parliamentary elections since 1962 in Uganda concluded after two days of voting (on Tuesday and Wednesday) for the 126 seats of the Bunge la Uganda, the unicameral legislature. Although the Chama cha Kidemokrasia (Democratic Party) received slightly more votes than President Milton Obote's Uganda People's Congress party, the UPC won 75 seats and Kidemokrasia won 50. Obote won a second term as president in the same election, in that whichever party had the majority in Parliament had the authority to decide the president.
- U.S. Representative John W. Jenrette, Jr. (D-S.C.) resigned from Congress after the special Ethics Committee of the House of Representatives opened its investigation in advance of a vote on expulsion. Jenrette, who had lost his bid for re-election after being convicted of bribery and conspiracy following the Abscam investigation, had only 24 days remaining in his term and departed before the House could take a vote on his removal.

== December 11, 1980 (Thursday) ==
- The U.S. Superfund, initially setting aside 1.6 billion dollars for cleanup of toxic pollution sites, was created after CERCLA (the Comprehensive Environmental Response, Compensation, and Liability Act) was signed into law by U.S. President Carter.
- South Korea's military government released eight political prisoners, including dissident Kim Chi-ha, a poet who had been imprisoned for more than six years. The release prompted speculation that the government would release former opposition leader Kim Dae Jung, who remained under a death sentence.
- The U.S. Paperwork Reduction Act was signed into law by President Carter. The law set a goal of reducing the number of pages of required federal forms by 15% by October 1, 1982, with a goal of 25% less by October 1, 1983.
- Tom Selleck's detective TV series Magnum, P.I., set in Hawaii, made its debut on CBS with a two-hour pilot, to replace the spot vacated by Hawaii Five-O. One critic opined that the series was "a formula cops-and-robbers job that promises little excitement" and added that "the plodding premiere episode of 'Magnum'... looked like it had lain in the sun too long." Selleck's combination of action and humor carried the show, which ran for eight seasons and 162 episodes.

== December 12, 1980 (Friday) ==
- Czechoslovak dissident Jaroslav Šabata was released from prison after almost two years, then arrested again a few hours later at his daughter's apartment in Prague, where many of his friends were waiting to welcome him. The Czechoslovak government charged Šabata with violating the terms of his release by associating with some of his former contacts within the Charter 77 human rights movement.
- Gene Wilder and Richard Pryor teamed up for one of the most popular films of the year, Stir Crazy, directed by Sidney Poitier.

== December 13, 1980 (Saturday) ==
- El Salvador's Foreign Minister José Napoleón Duarte, one of the four members of the governing junta, was announced as the Central American nation's new president after being selected as the chairman of the junta. Duarte became the first civilian in almost 50 years to serve as president of El Salvador, which had been governed by a series of military officers since the overthrow of Arturo Araujo on December 2, 1931. A new governing committee of three civilians (Duarte, Antonio Morales, and José Ramón Ávalos) and Salvadoran Army Colonel Jaime Abdul Gutiérrez, was formed after Colonel Arnoldo Majano and the former five member junta resigned. Duarte was sworn in on December 22.

== December 14, 1980 (Sunday) ==
- Following the example of shipyard workers making an independent labor union, farm workers in Poland organized Rural Solidarity (Rolników Indywidualnych Solidarność), officially Niezależny Samorządny Związek Zawodowy Rolników Indywidualnych "Solidarność”, or "Independent Self-Governing Trade Union of Individual Farmers 'Solidarity'"), which would receive government recognition on May 12, 1981.
- Four people were murdered and four others injured by two armed robbers at Bob's Big Boy on La Cienega Boulevard in Los Angeles.
- Died: Elston Howard, 51, American baseball player, 1963 American League Most Valuable Player and (in 1955) the first African-American to play for the New York Yankees, died of heart failure from myocarditis.

== December 15, 1980 (Monday) ==
- The 538 members of the United States Electoral College formally elected the President and Vice President of the United States in accordance with the Constitution. On November 4, voters in each state had selected between slates of electors pledged to a particular candidate, rather than the candidates themselves, and the electors then met in their respective state capitals. As expected, the final result was the team of Ronald Reagan and George H. W. Bush winning, 489 to 49, over the incumbent team of Jimmy Carter and Walter Mondale. Reagan, who had 50.7% of the popular vote, had 91% of the electoral votes.
- Voting as held for the 53-member National Assembly of the South American nation of Guyana. Prime Minister Forbes Burnham and his fellow members of the People's National Congress won 41 of the seats. The People's Progressive Party, led by and Guyana's first premier Cheddi Jagan won just 10 seats.
- A little more than three weeks after the November 23 earthquake in Italy, the damage from the tremors claimed nine additional lives in Naples. The "Hotel of the Poor", a nursing home for the elderly, was located in a 400-year-old building that had been built for the rulers of the Kingdom of Naples. Three different sets of inspectors had disagreed about whether to evacuate the crumbling building but had made no decision when one of the wings collapsed, killing eight women residents and a nurse.
- The guilty verdict against Marinus van der Lubbe in the 1933 criminal trial for the Reichstag Fire in Germany was thrown out by a West German court, 47 years after it had been made by a court in Nazi Germany. Van der Lubbe, a Dutch-born Communist, had been executed in 1934 for arson and high treason, after being arrested inside the ruins of the building. The decision was made despite a lack of more than circumstantial evidence of van der Lubbe's guilt, and without allowing investigators to determine whether other people (including Nazi Party members) had actually set the fire. The decision also reversed a 1967 court decision that had posthumously reduced van der Lubbe's punishment to eight years in prison but had upheld the guilty verdict. Since the end of World War II, Marinus's brother J. M. van der Lubbe had been pursuing a court review through a civil lawsuit. The trial itself had taken place in Leipzig, which was part of East Germany rather than West Germany in 1980.

== December 16, 1980 (Tuesday) ==
- For the first time, the worldwide price of oil reached more than $40 a barrel, as the ministers of the 13 member nations of OPEC (the Organization of the Petroleum Exporting Countries) voted a 10% increase to $41. The OPEC ministers reached the agreement at Denpasar in Indonesia, and permitted the member nations to set a range of prices with a minimum of $32 per barrel.
- Shareholders of the fourth-largest auto producer in the U.S., American Motors Corporation (AMC), voted to give control of the company to French auto producer Renault acquiring majority ownership, in return for Renault providing $200,000,000 in capital to AMC. The vote (based on number of shares owned by shareholder rather than individuals) was 23,692,969 shares in favor and 433,852 against. In two other votes, Renault also was granted stock options that could increase its ownership of the company to 59%, and the number of Renault executives on the AMC Board of Directors was increased from two to five.

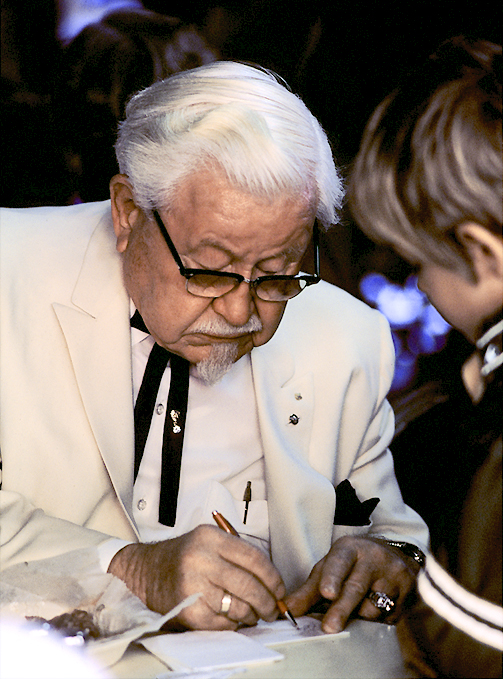
Sanders in 1974

- Died:
  - Harland Sanders, 90, American businessman who founded Kentucky Fried Chicken and then served as its spokesman as "Colonel Sanders".
  - José B. Lingad, 66, Philippine politician and opponent of the regime of President Ferdinand Marcos, was shot by an assassin.

== December 17, 1980 (Wednesday) ==
- The Soviet Union deployed its new version of what NATO called the SS-20 Saber nuclear missile, and the Soviets called the RSD-10 Pioner (Pioneer), with the capability of carrying three MIRV warheads that could be independently targeted at different locations following launch.
- Italian Minister of Transportation Rino Formica claimed that the crash of Itavia Flight 870 in June might have been caused by a missile.
- Died:
  - Şarık Arıyak, 50, Turkish diplomat who was Turkey's consul to Sydney as part of the Turkish Embassy in Australia. Ariyak and his bodyguard, Engin Sever, were shot to death as Ariyak was leaving his home to be driven to the Turkish Consulate.
  - General Admiral Oskar Kummetz, 89, an admiral of Nazi Germany's Kriegsmarine until the end of World War II.

== December 18, 1980 (Thursday) ==
- The hunger strike by seven inmates at Northern Ireland's Maze Prison came to an end after more than seven weeks. The decision was made by the prisoners near Ulster to end the strike, which began on October 27, after two of the men fasting were judged by physicians to have less than 24 hours to live. One of the strikers, Sean McKenna, was given the last rites by a Roman Catholic priest after going into a coma.
- Israel agreed to pay the United States an additional six million dollars to settle claims arising from its June 8, 1967 attack that killed 34 of the crew and seriously wounded 75 others on the American spy ship USS Liberty. The payment was for the costs for repairing the damage to Liberty and was to be made over three years. In 1968, Israel had paid $3,323,500 on behalf the families of the men killed, and in 1969 it paid another $3,452,275 for the injuries to those who had survived.
- Otema Allimadi was appointed as Prime Minister of Uganda by President Milton Obote, and would serve until the overthrow of the government on July 27, 1985.
- Born: Christina Aguilera, American pop music singer; in Staten Island, New York City.

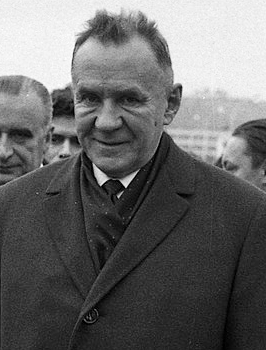
Kosygin

- Died: Aleksei N. Kosygin, 76, Premier of Russia from 1964 until 1980, died almost two months after he had retired because of worsening health.

== December 19, 1980 (Friday) ==
- The prime interest rate in the United States, a baseline for the interest rate chargeable on bank loans and an indicator of changes in the price inflation rate, was raised to 21 1/2 percent, a record high that has not been exceeded since then, having increased from 6 1/4 percent in the four years since the beginning of the presidency of Jimmy Carter. The increase (from 20 1/2 %) was approved by a vote of the seven members of the Federal Reserve Board and the presidents of five of the 12 Federal Reserve Bank, meeting jointly as the Federal Open Market Committee.
- Nikolai Dzhumagaliev, a serial killer in the Soviet Union, was captured in Uzynagash after murdering at least nine people in the Kazakh SSR over almost two years.
- Martin Scorsese's film Raging Bull, starring Robert De Niro as the boxer Jake LaMotta, was released nationwide. Although not a financial success, De Niro won an Academy Award for Best Actor, and the film would later be selected for preservation in the National Film Registry. Released on the same day was The Jazz Singer, a remake of the 1927 film of the same name that originated sound in motion pictures, was released, with singer Neil Diamond in the title role made famous by Al Jolson. Although the film itself was a commercial and critical failure, Diamond's recording of the movie soundtrack would become the third best-selling album of the year.
- The Socialist Republic of Vietnam adopted a new constitution, its first since North Vietnam's conquest and annexation of South Vietnam, to replace the 1959 North Vietnamese constitution.
- New York Air, an airline with flights limited to commuters between Washington, New York and Boston, began operations with non-union employees and inexpensive hourly flights. The airline later expanded to 13 states in the eastern and southern U.S. and was acquired in 1987 by Continental Airlines.
- Born: Jake Gyllenhaal, American film actor; in Los Angeles.
- Died: Chuck Cooper, 73, American professional basketball player and the first African-American to ever be drafted by the National Basketball Association, integrating the league in 1950.

== December 20, 1980 (Saturday) ==
- In what was nicknamed at the time as the "Silent Bowl", the NBC television network tried an unusual experiment in broadcasting a sporting even with no announcers, no play-by-play and no commentary, as it showed a live regular season game between the New York Jets and the Miami Dolphins from Miami. Neither Miami (8-7-0) nor the Jets (3-12-0) had any chance of making the playoffs when the game was played, and the Jets won, 24 to 17. Although television viewers' reaction was mixed media critics derided the experiment, with AP writer Fred Rothenburg commenting that "A football game without announcers, it turns out, is like reading an almanac."
- The Trapp Family Lodge, owned by the family made famous in the stage and film musical The Sound of Music, was completely destroyed by fire in Stowe, Vermont. Maria von Trapp and her family had emigrated to Vermont in 1942 after their escape from Austria, which had been annexed in 1938 by Nazi Germany to become the Ostmark. Maria and 44 other staff and guests fled, but one resident died in the blaze.

== December 21, 1980 (Sunday) ==
- All 70 people aboard an Aeroecésar jet airliner were killed in Colombia, five minutes after the SE-210 Caravelle took off from Riohacha toward Medellín. An explosion caused the plane to catch fire and it went down into the mountains with 63 passengers and seven crew. The TAC plane had been carrying "a cargo of fireworks", but it was uncertain whether that was the cause of the accident.
- In negotiations to end the Iran Hostage Crisis, Iran demanded almost $24,000,000,000 (24 billion dollars) from the United States as part of the release of Iranian assets that had been ordered frozen by U.S. President Carter after American Embassy officials were taken hostage. U.S. Secretary of State Edmund Muskie rejected the demand, which the U.S. press noted was $460,000,000 for each of the 52 American hostages who had been kept captive since November 4, 1979.
- Residents of the region of Galicia, in northwest Spain, voted in favor of autonomy in a referendum that attracted only 26% of the eligible voters. Galicia thus became the third region in Spain (after Catalonia and the Basque region) to receive self-government.
- Jean Hilliard, a 19-year old resident of Lengby, Minnesota, survived hypothermia that had lowered her pulse to 12 beats per minute, after more than seven hours collapsed in temperatures of less than −22 °F (−30 °C). After a car accident the night before, she had walked two miles to the house of a friend and fell 15 feet (4.6 m) from his front door, and was frozen solid by the time she was discovered at 7:00 in the morning. Taken to the hospital at Fosston, Hilliard was wrapped in an electric heading pad after her temperature was too low to measure, being below the 88 °F (31 °C) lower limit of the hospital thermometer. She revived, however, and told reporters later, "At worst, I might lose a couple of toes." Her story would later be featured in an episode of the American TV series Unsolved Mysteries.
- Vladimir Voinovich, a dissident Russian writer of satire who "spent nine years in a battle of will with Soviet officialdom" left the Soviet Union with his family after being asked by authorities to get out of the country.
- Died: Marc Connelly, 90, American playwright who wrote The Green Pastures in 1930

== December 22, 1980 (Monday) ==
- Francisco Pinto Balsemão was designated as the new Prime Minister of Portugal by Portugal's President Ramalho Eanes. Pinto Balsemao had been a close associate of the late Prime Minister Sá Carneiro, who had been killed in a plane crash on December 4.

== December 23, 1980 (Tuesday) ==
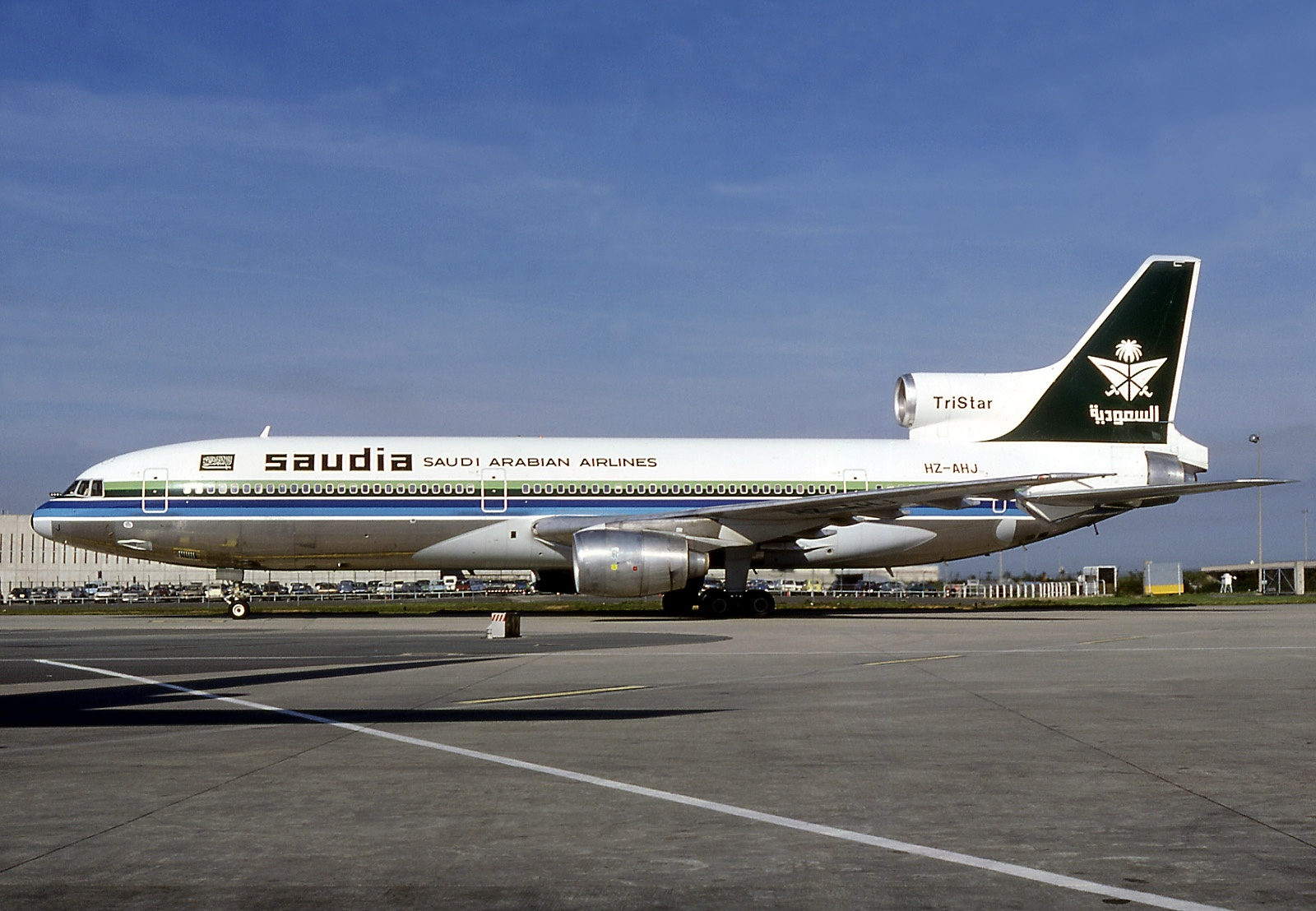
The ill-fated Saudia Flight 162

- Two Pakistani children, a 7-year-old boy and a 13-year-old girl, were killed when they fell from Saudi Arabian Airlines Flight 162 after a tire on the L-1011 TriStar landing gear exploded. The blast caused a wheel cover to tear a hole in the cabin floor at an altitude of 29,000 feet (8,800 m). The jet was flying over the Persian Gulf from Dhahran to Karachi. In the sudden depressurization, the two children were pulled through the one-meter wide hole and out of the airplane and fell to their deaths. The crew of 20 and the remaining 269 passengers landed safely in Qatar. The explosion happened at 2:12 in the morning local time; the accident is listed in some sources as happening on December 22 based on universal time being 2312 UTC.
- With Soviet government approval, the Holy Synod of the Russian Orthodox Church began preparations for the 1,000th anniversary of Christianity's introduction to Russia, to take place in 1988. The celebrations would take place on June 5, 1988.
- The U.S. Air Defense Command's first seven Joint Surveillance System radar stations went online, replacing the SAGE (Semi-Automatic Ground Environment) stations that were being phased out. The first seven JSS sites were in Paso Robles, California; Fort Lonesome, Florida; Cross City, Florida; The Plains, Virginia; and three others.
- Panay State Polytechnic College (now Capiz State University) was created at Roxas City in the Philippines by the merger of Mambusao Agricultural and Technical College and Capiz Agricultural and Fishery School.

== December 24, 1980 (Wednesday) ==
- Korvettes, the original discount department store chain, closed the last of its stores. At its height, Korvettes had 50 stores in New York City and other U.S. metropolitan areas, after opening its first outlet in 1948 with prices much lower than any of its competitors. By the end of 1980, it had declined to 17 stores.

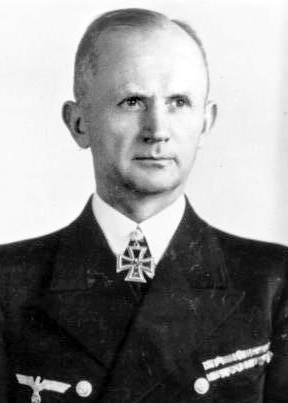
Admiral Doenitz

- Died: Grand Admiral Karl Doenitz, 89, former German naval officer and the last head of state of Nazi Germany, died at his home in Aumühle, West Germany. Doenitz was appointed to office after the suicide of Adolf Hitler on April 30, 1945 and served as the Fuehrer for one week, signing the instruments of surrender to the Allies.

== December 25, 1980 (Thursday) ==
- In the traditional holiday blessing given every Christmas by the head of the Roman Catholic Church, Pope John Paul II spoke from the balcony of St. Peter's Basilica in Rome, delivering the "Urbi et Orbi" ("To the City and the World") to more than 100,000 people in St. Peter's Square and to millions of television viewers in 31 countries. After delivering the blessing, John Paul then wished the world a merry Christmas in Latin and then in 41 modern languages, the most ever used for the occasion. In 1979, he had used 34 languages.
- Iran released films and still photographs showing the 52 U.S. Embassy hostages unharmed, and allowed half of them to send greetings to relatives. On the 418th day of their captivity, which had started on November 4, 1979, the hostages were allowed a celebration of Christmas Eve and Christmas Day, with services from the Roman Catholic papal nuncio to Iran and Iranian Protestant Christian clergymen. The hostages would remain captive until their release on January 20, 1981.

== December 26, 1980 (Friday) ==
- The Soviet Ilyushin Il-86 wide body jet airliner, Russia's "jumbo jet" began commercial service, with a flight from Moscow to Alma-Ata in the Kazakh SSR (now Kazakhstan). With four wing-mounted engines and a capacity to carry 350 passengers, the Il-86 had the unusual feature of passengers boarding and exiting on stairs through the belly of the plane. The initial flight was carried out only five days before a deadline of December 31 that had been set by the 25th Communist Party Congress. Most of the aircraft were manufactured for the Soviet flag carrier airline Aeroflot and its successors. The Il-86 proved to be a safe and reliable airplane, with no passenger fatalities in three decades of operation.
- What would become known as the case of Deng Xiaoping's dogs, animal abuse perpetrated in Lima, Peru by the terrorist group Shining Path, began with the group hanging seven stray dogs on lampposts around the Peruvian capital, and then attaching signs denouncing Deng, the powerful Vice-Premier of the People's Republic of China.
- Died:
  - Richard Chase, 30, American serial killer who murdered six people in Sacramento, California in January 1978, committed suicide by an overdose of prescription medicine while on death row at San Quentin State Prison.
  - Peck Kelley, 82, American jazz pianist

== December 27, 1980 (Saturday) ==
- The U.S. Postal Service issued the first of its Great Americans series of stamps, starting with its 19¢ stamp to honor the Cherokee educator Sequoyah, who had devised an 86-character system of writing for the Cherokee language. The first-day issue of the series of the stamps went on sale at Tahlequah, Oklahoma, capital of the Cherokee Nation, primarily to be used for the new 19¢ rate for international post cards. Over the next 18 years, the USPS honored women and men, concluding on July 27, 1999, with a 55¢ stamp for U.S. Congressman and Senator Justin Morrill.
- Canadian ice hockey defenseman Mark Howe of the Hartford Whalers was hospitalized after sustaining "a deep puncture wound in the rectal area" caused by "a pointed metal projection at the base of the Hartford net" after sliding into the back part of the goal during a game against the visiting New York Islanders. At the time, the National Hockey League goals had a frame that was fastened onto a spike 6 inches (150 mm) in length. Howe was cross-checked by an Islanders player, skidded into the goal post and as the frame was knocked loose, he was impaled by the bayonet-like spike. Suffering a deep internal puncture wound followed by sepsis, Howe required two surgeries and was out for six weeks, missing 17 games, but returned to the ice in February. The injury led the NHL to redesign its nets to a safer version.
- Jimmy Carter became the first incumbent U.S. president to sustain an accidental fracture while in office, breaking his collarbone after a fall while cross-country skiing at Camp David.

== December 28, 1980 (Sunday) ==
- In Italy, a mob of 100 inmates took over the maximum security wing of a prison at Trani and took 19 guards hostage. In the early hours of the next day, the Carabinieri GIS, Italy's special anti-terrorism force, stormed the prison grounds with helicopters and saved 18 of the 19 hostages and ended the inmates' revolt. In retaliation, a group calling itself the Communist Fighting Unit shot and killed the GIS deputy commander, General Enrico Calvaligi, on December 31.
- On the first anniversary of the Soviet intervention in Afghanistan, thousands of Afghans in Tehran stormed the Soviet Embassy and shouted anti-Soviet slogans. Afghans in Washington D.C., New Delhi, Bonn and Frankfurt also demonstrated, burning pictures of Soviet general secretary Leonid Brezhnev and Afghan general secretary Babrak Karmal.

== December 29, 1980 (Monday) ==
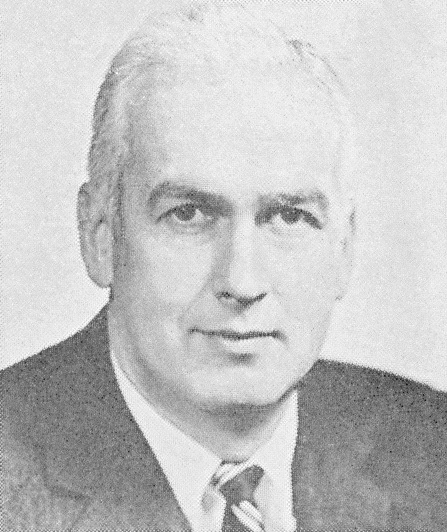
Thompson

- U.S. Representative Frank Thompson (D-New Jersey), one of the defendants convicted from the FBI's Abscam investigation for accepting a $50,000 bribe, resigned five days before the scheduled expiration of his term. Thompson, who had continually won re-election after 1954, had lost by a landslide in November in his bid for a 14th term. On December 3, he was convicted by a jury; after retirement from Congress, he received a pension of more than $4,000 per month for the rest of his life at an estimated $48,530 per year.
- Died: Tim Hardin, 39, American songwriter known for "If I Were a Carpenter", died of a heroin overdose

== December 30, 1980 (Tuesday) ==
- A hiker discovered the body of 19-year-old Peter Leonard Robertson of San Diego, California, who had fallen 200–250 feet (61–76 m) to his death while hiking at Pima Point at the Grand Canyon on November 3, 1978.
- The Vilnius TV Tower, at 1,071 feet (326 m) the tallest structure in Lithuania, opened in the capital of the Lithuanian SSR after six and a half years of construction by the Soviet government.
- Born: Eliza Dushku, American actress; in Boston

== December 31, 1980 (Wednesday) ==
- In Kenya, twenty people were killed and 87 injured at a historic hotel in Nairobi, The Norfolk. Most of the dead were foreign tourists who had been eating dinner in advance of New Year's Eve celebrations, when a time bomb exploded in a room directly above the dining room.
- Senegal's first and only president, Leopold S. Senghor, announced his resignation, to take effect on New Year's Day, and passed control of the West African nation to his prime minister, Abdou Diouf.

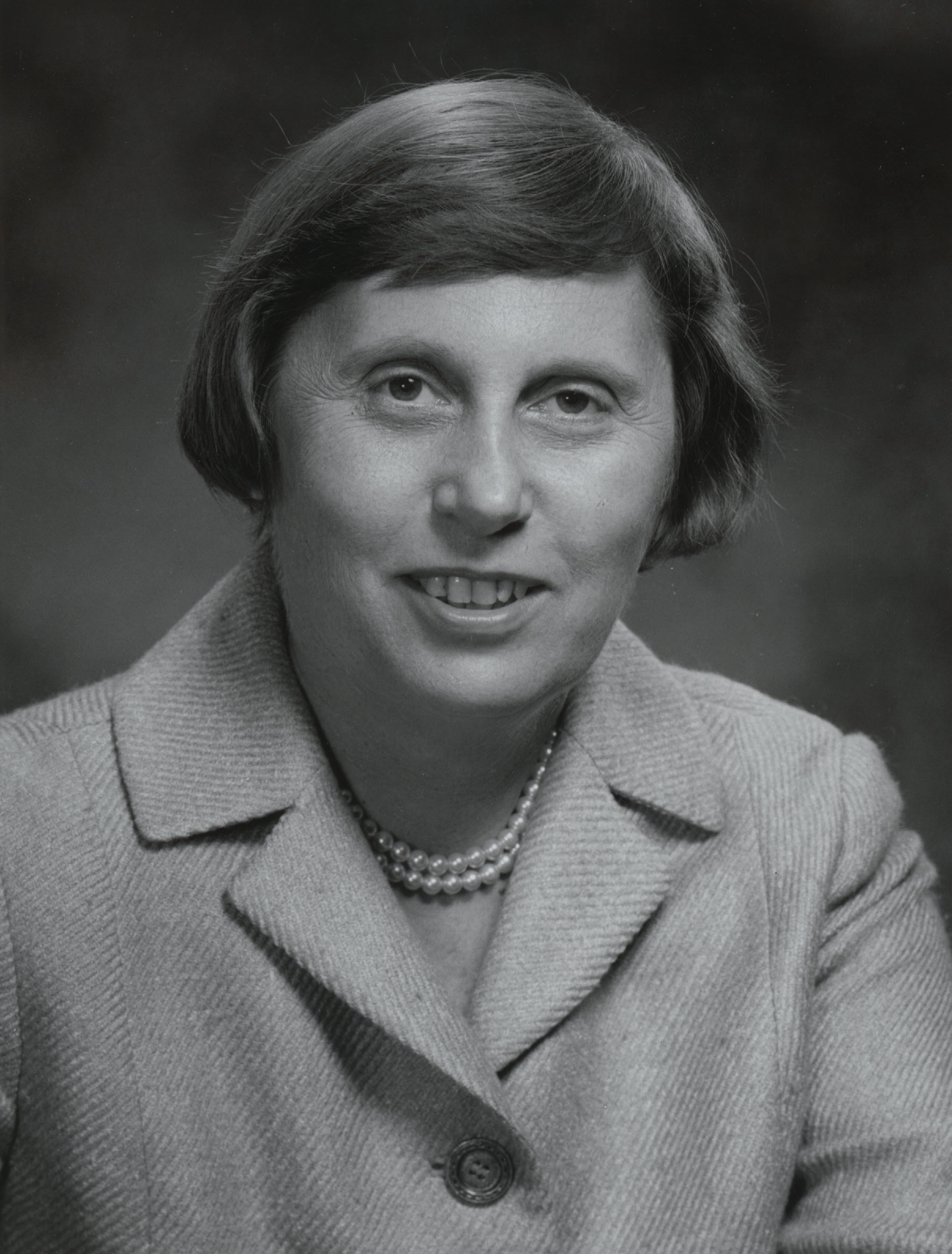
Governor Grasso

- Ella Grasso, the Governor of Connecticut since 1975, resigned at the end of the year after learning that her ovarian cancer was terminal. Grasso, who had become the first woman to be elected governor of a U.S. state without having previously been the wife of another governor, had announced her decision on December 4. She was succeeded by her lieutenant governor, William A. O'Neill. Grasso died 36 days later, on February 5.
- Born: Mark Dodge, U.S. Army officer who became a rookie college football player for Texas A&M at the age of 25; in Yerington, Nevada
- Died:
  - Marshall McLuhan, 69, Canadian author and communications theorist who profiled the effect of television on society. McLuhan had summed up his findings with the statement "The medium is the message," explaining that the technology of TV was more influential than the content of the information broadcast.
  - J.W. Milam, 61, white supremacist who had kidnapped, tortured, and murdered a 14-year-old African-American teenage boy named Emmett Till in late August 1955 for whistling at his half brother's wife, died of spinal cancer.
