= Rosa Judith Cisneros =

Salvadoran lawyer

Rosa Judith Cisneros Aguilar (1938-1981) was a Salvadoran lawyer. She was active in the fields of human rights and family planning until her assassination in 1981.

== Biography ==
Rosa Judith Cisneros was born in 1938. Her parents were Octavio Cisneros Ambrogi and Rosa del Carmen Aguilar de Cisneros.

In 1971 she presented her doctoral thesis at the University of El Salvador.

She was a member of the Episcopal Church. She never married.

== Positions held ==
- Executive director of the Salvadoran Demographic Association (Asociación Demográfica Salvadoreña), a private organization concerned with family planning.
- Legal director of CREDHO, an Episcopal programme designed to assist the rural poor through agricultural cooperatives and legal help.
- Legal adviser to the Salvadoran Communal Union, an organisation of peasants.
- Lay leader in the Episcopal diocese of El Salvador.

== The assassination ==
At the time of her death the Salvadoran Civil War was in progress. Assassinations were frequent including that of Archbishop Romero in March 1980. Rodolfo Viera, a leader of the Salvadoran Communal Union, had been murdered in San Salvador on 3 January 1981, together with two US labour advisers. A member of the Episcopal Church who had died in the conflict was the South African ambassador, Archibald Dunn, after capture by a guerrilla group.

On the morning of 18 August 1981, Rosa Judith Cisneros was leaving her house in a northern suburb of San Salvador when a carload of men halted her and dragged her to their car. An eyewitness reportedly saw her shot at close range with a submachine gun. The men did not identify themselves, nor did any group take responsibility for the killing.

Presiding Episcopal Bishop John M. Allin, then in Dresden for the meeting of the World Council of Churches central committee, issued a statement which noted that the assassination "robs that nation of a devoted and talented leader. Her senseless murder is a personal tragedy for the Episcopal Church in El Salvador. As a lawyer, author, and champion of the rights of women, and courageous humanitarian, Dr. Cisneros won the respect and trust of the public community".

== Works ==
- Contract Law as a legal instrument for economic integration in Central America (doctoral thesis) (1971), Faculty of Jurisprudence and Social Sciences, University of El Salvador
- The Juridical Condition of the Salvadoran Woman (Condición jurídica de la mujer salvadoreña) (1976), Fletcher School of Law and Diplomacy
- Child Health in a Changing World (La salud del niño en un mundo cambiante) (1978), Asociación Demográfica Salvadoreña
- Family Planning Communications and Contraceptive Use in Guatemala, El Salvador and Panama (co-author) (1982), Studies in Family Planning Vol. 13, No. 6/7 (Jun - Jul 1982), pp. 190–199, publ. Population Council

== Recognition ==
Rosa Judith Cisneros received the John Nevin Sayre award of the Episcopal Peace Fellowship posthumously in 1985.

Her name has been bestowed upon an Episcopal parish and upon the Our Little Roses mission for abused and abandoned girls in San Pedro Sula, Honduras.
