= January 1981 =

Month of 1981

<<	January 1981					>>
Su	Mo	Tu	We	Th	Fr	Sa
				1	2	3
4	5	6	7	8	9	10
11	12	13	14	15	16	17
18	19	20	21	22	23	24
25	26	27	28	29	30	31

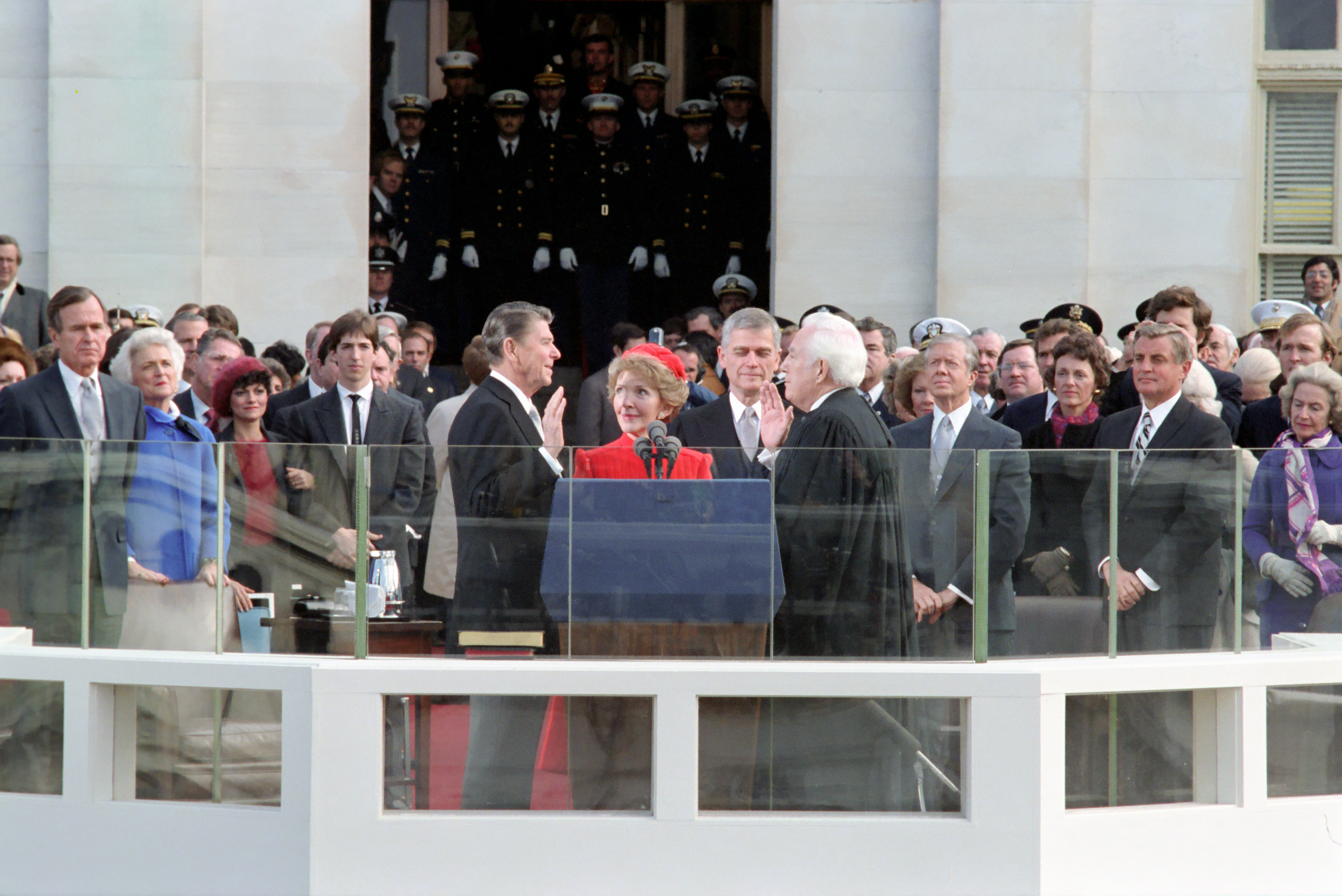
January 20, 1981: Reagan inaugurated as 40th U.S. President

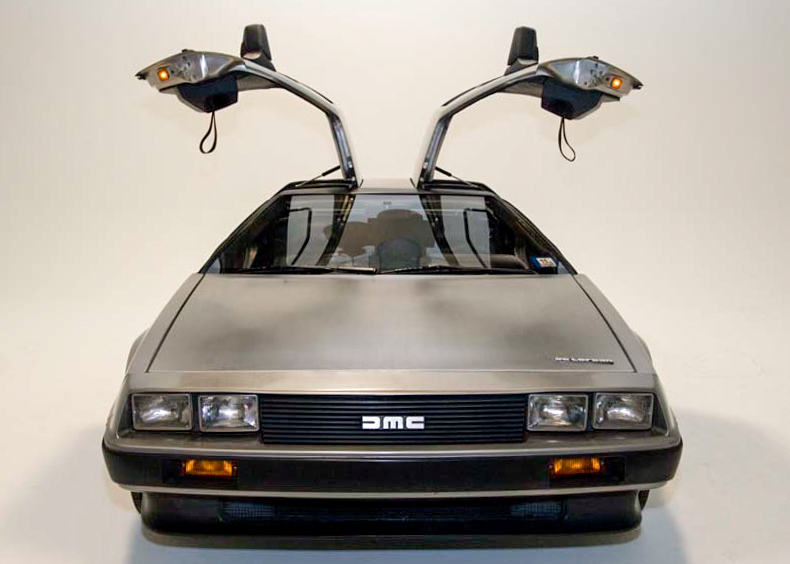
January 21, 1981: First DeLorean manufactured

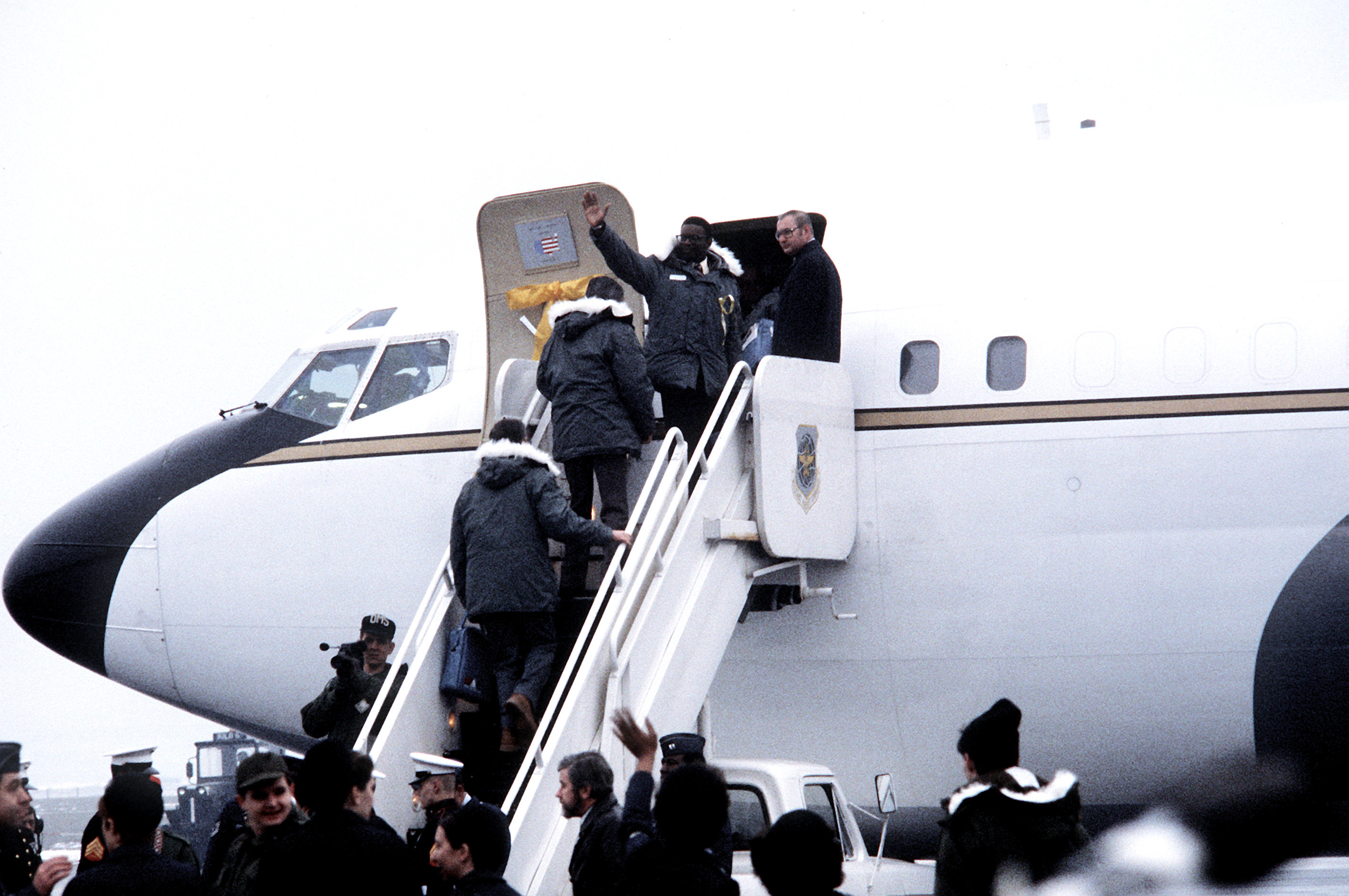
January 20, 1981: American hostages leave Iran after 444 days

January 1, 1981: Republic of Palau proclaimed

The following events occurred in January 1981:

== January 1, 1981 ==
- Georgia defeated Notre Dame in the Sugar Bowl, 17–10, to finish the 1980 NCAA Division I-A football season with a 12–0–0 record and the mythical national championship.
- Greece joined the "Common Market" (European Economic Community), now the European Union.
- The Republic of Palau was proclaimed in the Palau Islands of Micronesia. Under an agreement signed with the United States in 1980, the new nation would continue to be administered as a United States trust territory, with the U.S. handling Palau's foreign and military affairs.
- The United States minimum wage increased from $3.10 to $3.35 per hour, where it would remain until 1990, when it went to $3.85.
- Léopold Sédar Senghor, President of Senegal since the nation became independent in 1960, became the first African president to retire voluntarily, resigning in favor of his protégé, Vice-President Abdou Diouf.
- Born:
  - Mladen Petrić, Croatian footballer with 45 caps for the Croatia national team; in Brčko, Yugoslavia
  - Eden Riegel, American TV actress (All My Children), in Washington, D.C.
- Died: Mauri Rose, 74, American racer and Indianapolis 500 winner in 1941, 1947 and 1948

== January 2, 1981 (Friday) ==
- The "Yorkshire Ripper", serial killer Peter Sutcliffe, was arrested by police in Sheffield, England after the largest manhunt in British history. Over a period of six years, Sutcliffe was believed to have murdered 13 women.
- The Federal Reserve Board of Governors brought down the U.S. prime rate – the minimum interest rate for an American bank to loan money – from what remains its highest level in history. For 14 days, between December 19 and January 1, the rate had been at 21 1/2% and it was lowered to 20 1/2%; thirty-five years later, the prime rate would be 3.5%. The "prime rate" is that which is reserved for borrowers with the highest credit, with higher interest rates than prime permitted for borrowers considered to be at risk for default.
- Born: Maxi Rodríguez, Argentine footballer with 56 caps for the Argentina national team; in Rosario, Santa Fe

== January 3, 1981 (Saturday) ==
- Salvadoran labor leader José Rodolfo Viera, and two American representatives from the AFL-CIO, Michael P. Hammer and Mark David Pearlman, were assassinated at the Sheraton Hotel in San Salvador, by two members of the El Salvador National Guard. The gunmen, José Dimas Valle Acevedo and Santiago Gómez González, testified later that they had been ordered to carry out the murders after the victims had been recognized by businessman Hans Christ at the hotel's restaurant, and were sentenced to 30 years in prison in 1986. They were released after less than two years.
- Born: Eli Manning, American NFL quarterback for the New York Giants, MVP in Super Bowl XLII (2008); in New Orleans
- Died: Princess Alice, Countess of Athlone, 97, the last survivor of the 42 grandchildren of Queen Victoria of the United Kingdom

== January 4, 1981 (Sunday) ==
- The most expensive non-musical Broadway production to that date, The Monster Revived: Frankenstein, Victor Gialanella's adaptation of Mary Shelley's novel, was shown for the first time, and the last. Premiering at the Palace Theatre (Broadway) after the expense of two million dollars, the play was poorly reviewed and closed after one performance.

== January 5, 1981 (Monday) ==
- For the first time since Iraq had invaded its territory in September, Iran launched a counterattack, concentrating its armies at Sousangerd. After 18 months, Iraqi forces had been driven out of Iran, which then began a drive toward capturing Iraqi territory. The war would continue until 1988.
- Chuck Knox, who guided the Buffalo Bills to their first Division Title since 1966 American Football League season was named the Associated Press NFL Coach of the Year, narrowing edging Atlanta Falcons' Leeman Bennett.
- The Hitchhiker's Guide to the Galaxy, the first TV adaptation of the Douglas Adams book, debuted on BBC Two.
- Born: Deadmau5 (stage name for Joel Zimmerman); in Niagara Falls, Ontario
- Died:
  - Harold C. Urey, 87, American chemist who discovered the isotope deuterium, 1934 Nobel Prize laureate
  - Sir James Martin, 87, British engineer and inventor of ejection seat
  - Lanza del Vasto, 79, philosopher, poet, and activist

== January 6, 1981 (Tuesday) ==
- The merger of Libya and Chad was announced in Tripoli by Libya's President Muammar al-Gaddafi, and his guest, President Goukouni Oueddei of Chad, who had taken power in December with the help of 4,000 Libyan troops. At 1,175,112 square miles (3,043,530 km^{2}), the proposed nation would have been the largest in Africa and 7th largest in the world. The prospect of Libya's annexation of its southern neighbor prompted the member nations of the Organisation of African Unity to intervene, with the assistance of France, in forcing the peaceful withdrawal of Libyan forces and an end to the merger plan.
- The Brazilian ferry Novo Amapo sank in the Jari River after striking a sandbar. Although 211 survivors were rescued, at least 230 others drowned.
- The Dow Jones Industrial Average closed above 1,000 points for the first time since September 27, 1976, reaching 1004.69.
- Ronald Reagan and George H. W. Bush were officially certified as the winners of the U.S. presidential election, 1980, with outgoing U.S. Vice President Walter F. Mondale announcing that the Reagan-Bush ticket had received 489 electoral votes, as opposed to only 49 for Jimmy Carter and for Mondale.
- In Aumühle, West Germany, a funeral service was held to mourn the death of Karl Doenitz, the Grand Admiral of the German Navy in World War II and the last President of Germany up to that time. Doenitz had taken over as successor to Adolf Hitler on April 30, 1945, and signed the instruments of surrender on May 7. Doenitz, who spent 10 years in prison after conviction of war crimes, died on December 24, 1980.
- Born: Mike Jones, American rapper; in Houston
- Died: A. J. Cronin, 84, Scottish physician and novelist

== January 7, 1981 (Wednesday) ==
- After investment analyst Joseph Granville sent an overnight telegram to his customers with two words – "Sell everything!" – the New York Stock Exchange had its biggest trading day up to that time, with 92,890,000 shares changing hands.
- Earl Campbell of the Houston Oilers was named NFL Offensive Player of the Year by the Associated Press for the 3rd straight year.
- Died: Clair L. Farrand, 85, American inventor with over 1,000 electronics patents, including the radio loudspeaker

== January 8, 1981 (Thursday) ==
- In what has been described as "perhaps the most completely and carefully documented UFO sighting of all time", retired contractor Renato Nicolai witnessed what he believed to be French military aircraft on a test flight. After police forwarded the report to GEPAN, an investigative unit of France's space agency CNES, found traces of metal throughout the area where the UFO had been observed.
- Billy Sims of the Detroit Lions was named the Associated Press National Football League Offensive Rookie of the Year. Sims, who rushed for 1,303 yards on 313 carries with 13 touchdowns received 53 of the 84 votes. The Buffalo Bills' Joe Cribbs was second and the Miami Dolphins' David Woodley was third.
- Born: Xie Xingfang, Chinese badminton player, and women's singles champion in 2005 and 2006; in Guangzhou
- Died: Matthew Beard, 56, African-American actor who portrayed "Stymie" in The Little Rascals.

== January 9, 1981 (Friday) ==
- U.S. Representative Raymond F. Lederer (D-Pa.), the only one of the six indicted Abscam Scandal defendants to have won re-election to Congress in spite of the scandal, was convicted on charges of bribery and conspiracy. A jury in New York returned the verdict after watching a videotape of Lederer accepting $50,000 in cash in an FBI sting. Despite conviction on a felony, Lederer served for three more months until resigning on April 29, after the House Ethics Committee recommended his expulsion from the U.S. House of Representatives.
- A fire killed 31 elderly residents of the Beachview Rest Home in Keansburg, New Jersey. Another 78 patients and employees escaped the blaze.
- Born: Ebi Smolarek, Polish footballer with 47 caps for the Poland national team; in Łódź
- Died: Cozy Cole (William Randolph Cole), 71, American jazz drummer

== January 10, 1981 (Saturday) ==
- The FMLN launched a guerrilla war against the government of El Salvador which would last for eleven years. At 6:30 pm, after radio stations in San Salvador were seized and FMLN leader Cayetano Carpio announced "The hour... for the taking of power by the people... has arrived." and attacks were launched at multiple locations. One estimate is that 80,000 people, almost 2% of El Salvador's population of 4.5 million, were killed in the course of attacks and reprisals.
- Born: Jared Kushner, American investor, real-estate developer, son-in-law of U.S. President Donald Trump and Senior Advisor to the President of the United States; in Livingston, New Jersey
- Died:
  - Richard Boone, 63, American TV actor known for portraying Paladin on Have Gun, Will Travel, died from throat cancer.
  - Fawn M. Brodie, 65, American historian

== January 11, 1981 (Sunday) ==
- Iran dropped a demand that the United States deposit 24 billion dollars in gold into an Algerian bank as a condition of the release of 52 U.S. Embassy workers being held hostage in Tehran, settling instead for the release of the nearly 8 billion dollars of Iranian assets that had been frozen in American banks.
- Born: Jamelia (Jamelia Niela Davis), British singer; in Smethwick, West Midlands
- Died: Beulah Bondi, 92, American film actress known for portraying Ma Bailey in It's a Wonderful Life

== January 12, 1981 (Monday) ==
- At 1:30 am, the Macheteros, a separatist group in Puerto Rico, raided the Air National Guard's Muñiz Air Base and set explosives that destroyed nine jet fighters (8 A-7 Corsair IIs and an F-104 Starfighter).
- The television series Dynasty began a nine-year run on the ABC network. The prime time soap opera, described by New York Times TV critic Tom Buckley as "An embarrassingly obvious knockoff of Dallas", starred Joan Collins as Alexis Carrington, who briefly brought back the popularity of women's wear with padded shoulders. Dynasty was the #1 rated TV program in the United States during the 1983–84 television season.

== January 13, 1981 (Tuesday) ==
- Donna Griffiths, a 12-year-old girl in Pershore, Worcestershire, in the United Kingdom, began sneezing, and continued to sneeze repeatedly, for 978 consecutive days. Initially sneezing twice every minute, her rate would eventually slow to once every five minutes. Donna would have her first day without sneezing on September 16, 1983.
- Died: Dr. Owen H. Wangensteen, 82, American surgeon and inventor who created the suction procedure used in gastrointestinal surgery.

== January 14, 1981 (Wednesday) ==
- The U.S. Food and Drug Administration approved the sale of the first extended wear contact lenses, which could be left in the eyes for up to two weeks. The Hydrocurve II lenses were manufactured by a subsidiary of Revlon.

== January 15, 1981 (Thursday) ==
- Hill Street Blues, described as "one of the most innovative and critically acclaimed television shows in recent television history" and a program that "set an entirely new standard for television drama" made its debut on NBC at 10:00 pm EST.
- Born:
  - El Hadji Diouf, Senegalese footballer with 70 caps for the Senegal national team; in Saint-Louis
  - Pitbull (stage name for Armando Christian Pérez), American rapper; in Miami
- Died:
  - Emanuel Celler, 92, U.S. Congressman with a 50-year career from 1923 to 1973
  - David E. Lilienthal, 81, former TVA and AEC chairman

== January 16, 1981 (Friday) ==
- Bernadette Devlin McAliskey, who had served as a British MP and an advocate for the rights of Roman Catholics in Northern Ireland, was shot multiple times, along with her husband, by Protestant gunmen of the paramilitary group Ulster Freedom Fighters who had invaded their home. Five days later, Protestant leader Norman Stronge, who had been the last leader of the Northern Ireland parliament, was shot and killed, along with his son, by an eleven-member Irish Republican Army unit, at their home, Tynan Abbey.
- Died: Bernard Lee, 73, English actor who portrayed "M" in multiple James Bond films

== January 17, 1981 (Saturday) ==
- After eight years, by Proclamation No. 2034, martial law was lifted in the Philippines by President Ferdinand Marcos, who had declared a state of emergency on September 22, 1972. Marcos announced that emergency rule would continue for three more years.
- Born:
  - Scott Mechlowicz, American film actor known for EuroTrip; in New York City
  - Ray J (stage name for William R. Norwood, Jr.), American rapper and singer; in McComb, Mississippi
- Died: Marguerite Oswald, 73, conspiracy theorist and mother of Lee Harvey Oswald.

== January 18, 1981 (Sunday) ==
- BASE jumping was founded by Phil Smith and Phil Mayfield as they jumped off of the 72nd floor of the Texas Commerce Tower in Houston and parachuted to the ground. The pair had previously leapt from an antenna, a bridge and a cliff.
- At Deptford, a mostly black neighborhood in London, thirteen young black British people died in the "New Cross Fire" during a 16th birthday party for one of the victims, Yvonne Ruddock. The fire, believed by many in the black community to have been set by racists, was cited as a factor in the 1981 Brixton riot three months later.
- Serial killer Joseph G. Christopher, later implicated in the deaths of 12 African-American men over the previous four months, was arrested at Fort Benning in Georgia after trying to stab a black soldier in his training unit. Private Christopher received a 60-year prison sentence in 1982 after being convicted of three of the September shootings. He would told The Buffalo News in 1983 that he killed 13 people, all black men, because "that was the directive" from "a collection of people". Christopher would die of cancer in 1993 while in prison.

== January 19, 1981 (Monday) ==
- Mohammed Seddik Benyahia, the Foreign Minister of Algeria, successfully brokered the Algiers Accords agreement to end the Iran hostage crisis between the United States and Iran, which was signed on behalf of the U.S. by Deputy Secretary of State Warren Christopher in Algiers at 10:30 am, after having been signed earlier by Iranian officials in Tehran.
- Born: Lucho González, Argentine footballer with 45 caps for the national team; in Buenos Aires

== January 20, 1981 (Tuesday) ==
- The Iran hostage crisis ended after 444 days, only 25 minutes after Jimmy Carter's term as the 39th President of the United States had ended. Carter had hoped that the 52 American hostages in Iran would be allowed to leave while he was still in office, and at 6:18 am Washington time, the escrow papers were completed to transfer $7,970,000,000 in Iranian assets from U.S. banks to the Bank of England. At 8:04 am EST, the Algerian intermediaries notified both the U.S. and Iran that the transfer was complete. The Boeing 727 carrying the hostages, Air Algérie Flight 133, was boarded at 8:20 pm Tehran time (11:50 am EST) but was not cleared for takeoff.
- At noon, Ronald Reagan was sworn into office as the 40th president of the United States, and the Air Algérie jet departed at 12:25 pm; it left Iranian airspace within an hour, landing in Athens for refueling, then arriving at Algiers at 2:10 am local time the next day, where the former hostages were transferred to two Medevac planes and flown to Wiesbaden Army Airfield in West Germany.
- Born:
  - Brendan Fevola, Australian rules footballer, winner 2006 and 2009 of the Australian Football League Coleman Medal for most goals kicked in a season; in Melbourne
  - Owen Hargreaves, Canadian-born English footballer with 42 caps for the England national team; in Calgary
  - Jason Richardson, American NBA player who led the league in 3-point goals in the 2007-08 NBA season, and was slam-dunk champion in 2002 and 2003; in Saginaw, Michigan
  - David J. Peterson, American conlanger, in Long Beach, California

== January 21, 1981 (Wednesday) ==
- The first production DeLorean automobile was produced in Dunmurry, Northern Ireland. The sports car was stainless steel and had gull-wing doors, and was featured in Back to the Future.
- In his first full day at the White House as National Security Advisor to President Reagan, Richard V. Allen accepted at least $1,000 and watches from the Japanese women's magazine Shufo no tomo in return for arranging an interview with First Lady Nancy Reagan. After the matter came to light, Allen was forced to resign on January 4, 1982.
- Feodor Fedorenko, who had come to the U.S. in 1949 after earlier having been a supervisor of the Treblinka extermination camp, lost his citizenship when the United States Supreme Court affirmed prior rulings by a 7–2 vote. Fedorenko was deported to the Soviet Union in 1984, where he was executed for treason in 1987.
- Two commercial divers, Philip Robinson and Jim Tucker, were rescued from a crippled diving bell in the East Shetland Basin by an underwater transfer to another diving bell. This was the first through-water transfer in the history of diving.
- Born:
  - Dany Heatley, German-born player with 42 games for the Canadian national ice hockey team and 2000 Olympic gold medalist for Team Canada; in Freiburg im Breisgau, West Germany
  - Gillian Chung (stage name for Chung Tik-shan), Chinese singer for the duo Twins, in Hong Kong

== January 22, 1981 (Thursday) ==
- East German soccer football stars Gerd Weber, Matthias Müller and Peter Kotte were arrested by the Stasi at the Dresden airport, just as they were preparing to travel with the national team to a match in Argentina, and charged with plotting to defect to West Germany. All three were banned from the game, and Weber, himself a Stasi employee, was jailed until 1989.
- Annie Leibovitz's iconic photograph of a nude John Lennon kissing a fully clothed Yoko Ono was first published. The photo appeared on the cover of Rolling Stone magazine's tribute issue to Lennon.
- Born:
  - Willa Ford, American singer and actor; in Ruskin, Florida
  - Beverley Mitchell, American singer and actor; in Arcadia, California
  - Ben Moody, American singer and actor (formerly of Evanescence); in Little Rock, Arkansas

== January 23, 1981 (Friday) ==
- South Korea's President Chun Doo-hwan commuted the 1980 death sentence that had been given to Kim Dae-jung, who had run for president in 1971, and then was kidnapped from Japan in 1973. The next day, President Chun announced the end of the state of martial law that had been in effect since 1979. Kim would be released in 1983, and in 1997 would be elected President of South Korea.
- Seven construction workers in Fresno County, California, were killed when an elevator platform at PG&E's Helms Creek plant collapsed at 10:25 pm, ninety minutes before their workweek was to end. The men fell 300 feet (91 m) to their deaths.
- The city of Huber Heights, Ohio, was incorporated.
- Died: Samuel Barber, 70, American classical composer

== January 24, 1981 (Saturday) ==
- François Mitterrand was nominated by France's Socialist Party as its candidate for president in the 1981 elections.
- The British Labour Party special conference at Wembley decided that leadership elections should be by an electoral college limited to only 30 percent of members of parliament.
- A 6.8 magnitude earthquake in Sichuan, China, killed 150 people and injured 300. The quake struck at 5:13 am local time (2113 GMT on January 23).
- Died: Captain Joseph Mokoa, General Josephat Mayomokola, Joseph Baissa, Dr. Jean-Bruno Dédéavodé, Robert Boukendé and Pierre Koba. All were executed by a firing squad for crimes committed during the reign of terror by Bokassa I of the Central African Empire. Bokassa himself, who had been sentenced to death in absentia, remained free in Côte d'Ivoire.

== January 25, 1981 (Sunday) ==
- The Limehouse Declaration was made by four former Labour cabinet ministers (Roy Jenkins, Shirley Williams, Bill Rodgers and David Owen) to announce the formation of the new Social Democratic Party, bringing with them 29 Labour MPs.
- Super Bowl XV was won by the Oakland Raiders, who defeated the Philadelphia Eagles, 27–10. Jim Plunkett, the game's MVP, had been a "has-been" until becoming the starting quarterback after an early season injury to Dan Pastorini. Rod Martin shut down the Eagles' drives with three interceptions.
- The fifty-two Americans, who had been held hostage at the U.S. Embassy in Iran, returned to United States soil at 2:54 pm, as the plane carrying them landed at Stewart Air National Guard Base in New York. The group, who had been freed five days earlier, had flown from West Germany and were greeted by a crowd of 300,000 well-wishers.
- Following her conviction at the Gang of Four trial, Jiang Qing, the widow of Mao Zedong, was sentenced to death, with a two-year suspension during which she could repent. "Madame Mao" wasn't executed, but would stay in custody until her suicide in 1991. Zhang Chunqiao were sentenced to death; Wang Hongwen was sentenced to life imprisonment, and Yao Wenyuan to 25 years.
- Born:
  - Alicia Keys (stage name for Alicia Augello Cook), American pop singer; in New York City
  - Tose Proeski, Macedonian pop singer; in Prilep, Yugoslavia (killed in car crash, 2007)
- Died:
  - Adele Astaire, 84, American dancer and actress
  - Joseph Francel, 85, New York executioner of Julius and Ethel Rosenberg.

== January 26, 1981 (Monday) ==
- In Chandler v. Florida, the United States Supreme Court ruled in an 8–0 decision that it was not a denial of due process to allow live television coverage of court proceedings, overruling its 1965 decision in Estes v. Texas.

== January 27, 1981 (Tuesday) ==
- An estimated 471 passengers on a ferry drowned when the Indonesian ship KMP Tampomas II sank in the Java Sea during a storm. Of the 1,136 passengers and crew, 566 were rescued, including 152 who were found in lifeboats days afterward. Operated by the Pelni line, the ship was a roll-on/roll-off (ro-ro) ferryboat that had caught fire midway through its voyage from Jakarta to Makassar. The fire was extinguished, but the engines failed and the ship was adrift and awaiting a rescue when a storm arose. Before the ship could be fully evacuated, it capsized, going completely beneath the waters at 1:42 in the afternoon Central Indonesian time (0542 GMT).

== January 28, 1981 (Wednesday) ==
- President Reagan signed Executive Order 12287, immediately ending all United States federal price and allocation controls on gasoline and fuel oil. Price controls had been in effect since 1971. Although the short-term effect was a rise in gas prices, American oil companies increased their production and created an oil glut by summer.
- The "Paquisha War" began as Ecuador and Peru clashed when Ecuadorian forces had established an outpost 40 miles (64 km) into territory that had been lost to Peru in 1942. Despite initial reports by Peru of hundreds of deaths on both sides, Ecuador acknowledged that two of its soldiers were killed, and Peru had one killed and three wounded.
- Born: Elijah Wood, American actor known for The Lord of the Rings film series; in Cedar Rapids, Iowa

== January 29, 1981 (Thursday) ==
- Adolfo Suárez, the Prime Minister of Spain since 1976, surprised the nation by announcing his resignation and his departure from the political party he had helped found, the UCD.
- Born: Jonny Lang, American musician; in Fargo, North Dakota

== January 30, 1981 (Friday) ==
- Commandos from the South African Defence Force crossed over into Mozambique and attacked the town of Matola in a raid against three houses occupied by African National Congress members. "Operation Beanbag" killed 15 ANC members and a Portuguese technician. The SADF lost three members in their first cross-border raid.
- Born:
  - Peter Crouch, English footballer who played as a target-man forward striker with 42 caps for the England national team; in Macclesfield
  - Dimitar Berbatov, Bulgarian footballer and all time Bulgarian National Team goalscorer with 78 caps and 48 goals for the Bulgaria national team; in Blagoevgrad
  - Afonso Alves, Brazilian footballer and Dutch Footballer of the Year winner in 2006–07 while playing with the team SC Heerenveen; in Belo Horizonte

== January 31, 1981 (Saturday) ==
- Thought by scientists to have been extinct since 1895, the golden-fronted bowerbird (Amblyornis flavifrons) was discovered to have survived. American ornithologist Jared Diamond of UCLA discovered the home ground of the golden-fronted bowerbird at the Foja Mountains. Diamond photographed several of the birds, then lost his film when his boat capsized and had to make a second expedition. The rediscovery was confirmed at a November 10, 1981, press conference at the National Geographic Society in Washington, which, with the World Wildlife Fund, had co-sponsored Diamond's research.
- The first parade to honor veterans of the Vietnam War was organized by the veterans themselves, in Indianapolis, eight years after the conflict ended. Hundreds of vets, wrote a New York Times reporter, "marched Saturday in counterpoint to the heroic reception of the former American hostages... offering themselves the parade they said nobody gave them when they came home from war."
- CCM Robert K. Jones, the last of the American "NAP"s, retired from the U.S. Navy. The "Naval Aviation Pilots" were enlisted men rather than Navy, Marine or Coast Guard officers.
- Born:
  - Gemma Collins, English media personality and businesswoman; in Romford, East London
  - Justin Timberlake, American musician; in Memphis, Tennessee
