= November 1980 =

Month of 1980

<<	November 1980					>>
Su	Mo	Tu	We	Th	Fr	Sa
						1
2	3	4	5	6	7	8
9	10	11	12	13	14	15
16	17	18	19	20	21	22
23	24	25	26	27	28	29
30

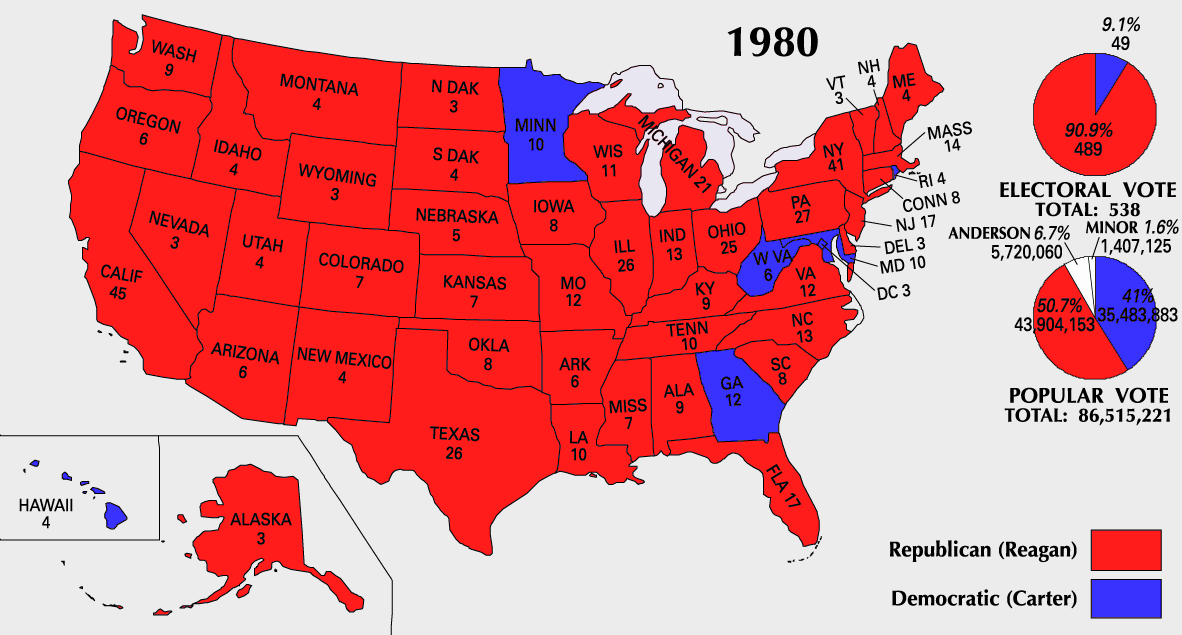
November 4, 1980: Republican Ronald Reagan defeats U.S. President Jimmy Carter in 44 of the 50 states

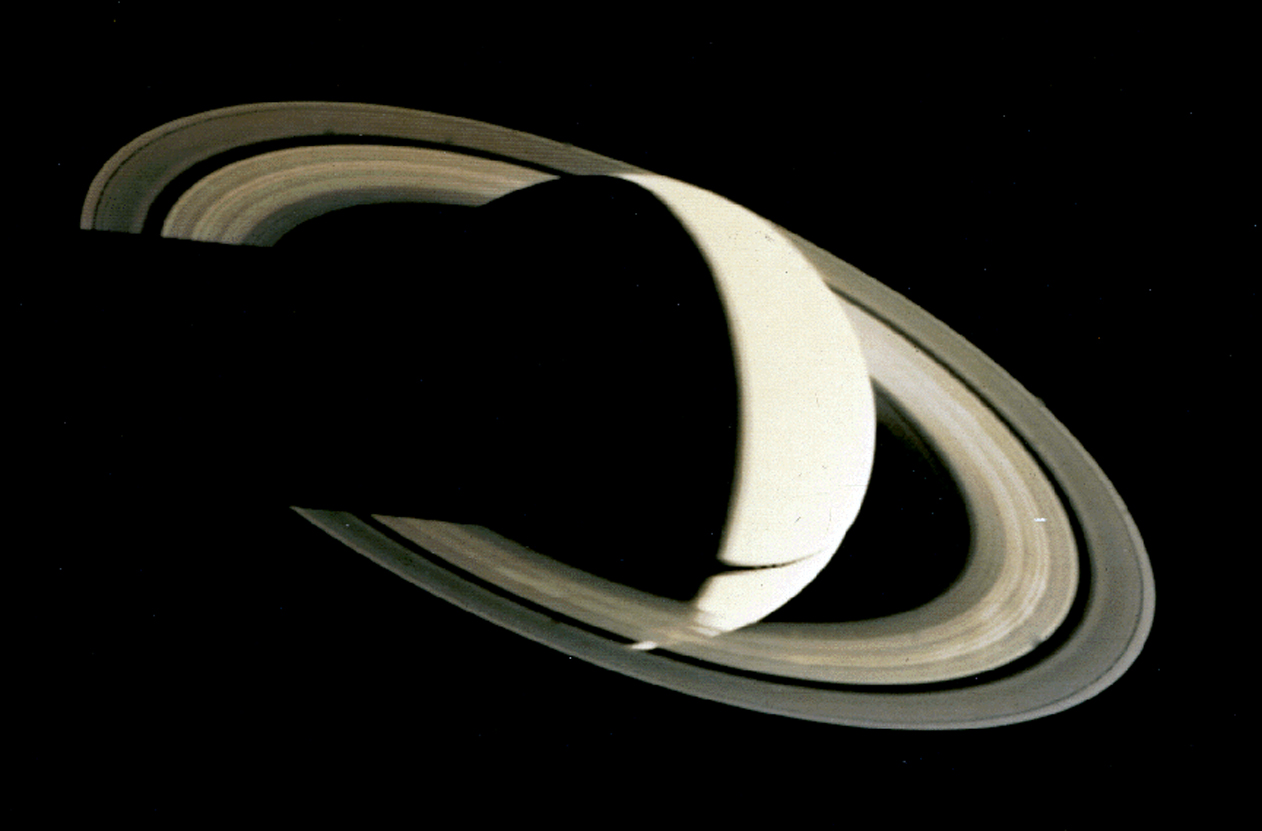
November 12, 1980: Saturn photographed up close by Voyager 1

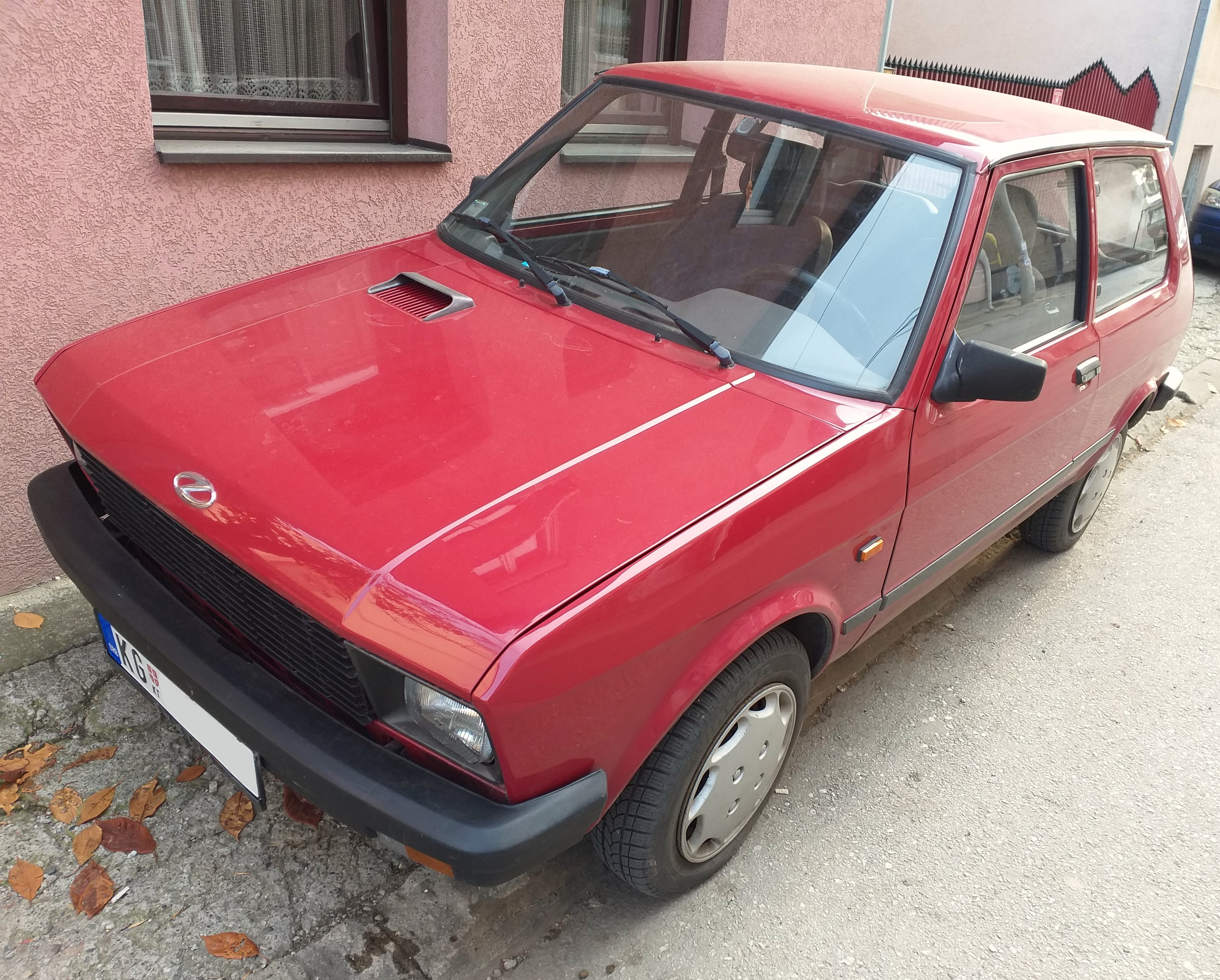
Yugoslavia makes its first "Yugo"

The following events occurred in November 1980:

== November 1, 1980 (Saturday) ==
- The CSX Corporation, which now operates about 21,000 miles (34,000 km) of track, was created by the merger of two U.S. railroads, the Chessie System and the Seaboard Line. The merged company operated the tracks of the Chesapeake & Ohio Railway (C&O), Baltimore & Ohio Railroad (B&O), the Seaboard Coast Line Railroad (SCL), and the Louisville and Nashville Railroad (L&N).
- For the first time, contraceptives could be sold legally in Ireland as the Family Planning Act went into effect. Sale was not mandatory, and Ireland's Catholic Guild of Pharmacists, of which half of the nation's pharmacists were members, urged druggists to refuse to sell birth control devices. At the same time, the law required the eight private family planning clinics in Ireland to register with the government or to be closed. For several years, the private clinics had bypassed the law against sales by giving out contraceptives and accepting voluntary donations of money.
- Edward Seaga was sworn in as the new Prime Minister of Jamaica.
- An agreement was signed in Plymouth, Montserrat by the leaders of six Caribbean island nations and the British Overseas Territory of Montserrat to create the Organisation of Eastern Caribbean States (OECS), which would result in the signing of the Treaty of Basseterre on June 18, 1981. The other founding members were Antigua and Barbuda, Dominica, Grenada, Saint Kitts and Nevis, Saint Lucia and Saint Vincent and the Grenadines.
- At the request of the West African nation of Gambia, neighboring Senegal airlifted 150 troops to prevent a possible invasion by Libya.

== November 2, 1980 (Sunday) ==
- Iran's parliament, the Majlis voted to free the 52 U.S. Embassy hostages if, and only if, four demands were met: (1) a commitment by the U.S. to not interfere with the affairs of the Islamic Republic of Iran; (2) the release of frozen Iranian assets that had been frozen on November 14, 1979; (3) the cancellation of economic sanctions against Iran; and (4) to return to Iran all U.S. properties of the late Shah of Iran.
- The Indian Army sent troops into the Assam state after protesters had spent 10½ months blockading a pipeline that shipped the state's crude oil to the rest of the nation. The final incident that led to the army intervention was when students held 43 state legislators prisoner inside a building at Dispur. Since the protests— which centered on demands that all foreigners should be expelled from Assam, primarily those who fled from Bangladesh — had started at the beginning of the year, at least 1,600 people had been killed or had disappeared.
- After his Liberal Party coalition lost 13 seats in House of Representatives elections, Australia's Prime Minister Malcolm Fraser fired five of his cabinet ministers including Business and Consumer Affairs Minister Eric Robinson.
- Died: Willie Sutton, 79, American bank robber. Sutton, who spent 44 years in prison until being paroled at the end of 1969, estimated that he had stolen more than two million dollars from banks before going into hiding in 1946, and eluded capture until 1952. When asked about why he robbed banks, Sutton famously replied "Because that's where the money is."

== November 3, 1980 (Monday) ==
- Control of the 49 American hostages at the U.S. Embassy in Tehran was turned over by their student captors to the Iranian government, almost a year after the November 4, 1979 takeover. The hostages, however, continued to be held by the students.
- The U.S. State Department issued an embargo against the importation of tuna from Ecuador, in reprisal from the South American nation's seizure of American boats fishing more than 12 miles (19 km) off of its coast. Ecuador, which sought to collect a license fee of $100,000 per each boat, claimed that its territorial waters extended 200 miles (320 km) into the Pacific Ocean.

== November 4, 1980 (Tuesday) ==
- Former California Governor Ronald Reagan was elected President of the United States in a landslide victory over incumbent President Jimmy Carter. Carter conceded defeat at 9:50 p.m. Eastern time in Washington, D.C., while voting was still in progress on the U.S. Pacific coast. Reagan won the most votes in 44 of the 50 states of the U.S. and received 489 of the 538 electoral votes. With 43,903,230 votes against Carter's 35,480,115 and 5,719,850 from independent challenger John B. Anderson, Reagan had a majority of the popular vote and was sworn in on January 20 as the 40th President of the United States. Carter carried only his state of Georgia, Vice President Walter Mondale's state of Minnesota, and West Virginia, Maryland, Hawaii, Rhode Island and the District of Columbia. Anderson's best showing was in Massachusetts, where he won more than 15% of the popular vote. The vote took place exactly one year after the beginning of the Iran hostage crisis, which was still ongoing at the time of the election.
- While the Democratic Party retained control of the U.S. House of Representatives with 243 seats to the Republican Party's 192, the Republicans captured a 53 to 47 majority in the U.S. Senate, changing the balance, which had previously been a 59 to 41 Democratic majority.
- Died:
  - Johnny Owen, 24, Welsh professional boxer and European bantamweight champion, died 46 days after sustaining a head injury during his September 19 bout with Lupe Pintor for the WBC bantamweight title.
  - Elsie MacGill, 75, pioneering Canadian aeronautical engineer and electrical engineer

== November 5, 1980 (Wednesday) ==
- Helmut Schmidt was formally re-elected Chancellor of West Germany and sworn in for a third term. The vote in the Bundestag followed party lines along the results of the October 5 election, a 282 to 254 win over Franz Josef Strauss from Schmidt's SPD/FDP coalition over Strauss's CDU/CSU party.
- Julius Nyerere was sworn in for a fourth, and final, five-year term as President of Tanzania at Dar es Salaam. Nyerere had announced earlier that he would not seek re-election in 1985.
- Born: Christoph Metzelder, German professional soccer football centre back and German national team member at two World Cups

== November 6, 1980 (Thursday) ==
- The first activation of a surgically implanted insulin pump in a human being took place at the University of Minnesota, when a 54-year-old patient with Type 2 diabetes was deemed ready for the use of the "Infusaid Model 400 Constant Rate" delivery of insulin. Although external intravenous insulin pumps had first been used in 1963 for outpatient therapy, the device (described as the size of an ice hockey puck) was the first small enough to be placed into a person's body, an operation which had taken place on September 5.
- Sir David Beattie took office as the new Governor-General of New Zealand after being appointed by Queen Elizabeth II on the recommendation of Prime Minister Robert Muldoon. Beattie succeeded Sir Keith Holyoake, who had resigned on October 25, and served as New Zealand's head of state until November 10, 1985.
- Former Iranian foreign minister Sadegh Ghotbzadeh was arrested in Tehran after criticizing government television's "first channel" and its Islamic fundamentalist administrators during a debate on the "second channel". He was released after a few days on the intervention of the Ayatollah Khomeini.

== November 7, 1980 (Friday) ==
- A young married couple in Rockville, Maryland committed suicide before over 100 witnesses in a courtroom as they awaited sentencing on drug possession. William Melton, 27, and Tracy Melton, 21, were at their sentencing hearing when William ingested potassium cyanide powder. As he went into seizures and collapsed, Tracy poisoned herself as well. The clerk of the Montgomery County Circuit Court commented later, "They weren't even going to get a long sentence. They just would have ended up in the pre-release center."
- Born: Gervasio Deferr, Spanish gymnast and Olympic gold medalist in 2000 and 2004, in Premià de Mar, Catalonia
- Died:
  - Steve McQueen, 50, American film and television star, died at the Plaza Santa Maria hospital in Ciudad Juárez, Mexico, 13 hours after surgery for tumors caused by mesothelioma, at the time considered a "rare, untreatable form of lung cancer". In addition to calling worldwide attention to mesothelioma, McQueen's case also demonstrated the inefficacy of laetrile as a treatment for cancer.
  - Ilhan Erdost, 35, Turkish publisher who had been arrested after the September 12 coup d'état, was beaten to death by guards at the Mamak military prison in Ankara.

== November 8, 1980 (Saturday) ==
- On the Islamic calendar, the 15th Century AH (anno hegirae) began on 1 Muharram 1401 AH.
- At 2:28 in the morning local time (1028 UTC), a 7.3 magnitude earthquake struck off the coast of California at a depth of 10 kilometres (6.2 mi), causing damages of more than two million dollars and six injuries, none of them fatal. The quake led to the cancellation of plans to restart the Humboldt Bay Nuclear Power Plant near Eureka, California.

== November 9, 1980 (Sunday) ==
- The first of two rounds of parliamentary elections for the Ivory Coast was carried out throughout the western African nation. Although there was only one political party in the Ivory Coast, there were 649 candidates vying for the 147 parliamentary districts. Seventy-four of the seats were filled by candidates who received more than 50 percent of the vote. In the second round, held on November 23, runoff elections were held for the other 73 seats, with voters choosing between the two candidates in each district who had received the highest number of votes in their district.
- Died:
  - Victor Sen Yung, 65, Chinese-American film and TV actor, known as Jimmy Chan in the Charlie Chan film series and later as Hop Sing on the TV show Bonanza, was found dead in his home in North Hollywood, California
  - Gloria Guinness (nee Gloria Rubio y Alatorre), 68, Mexican socialite and fashion icon
  - Carmel Myers, 81, American silent film actress famous for being a "vamp" in the 1920s.

== November 10, 1980 (Monday) ==
- The United Kingdom's Labour Party members of parliament voted on a new leader to replace James Callaghan as Leader of the Opposition. Callaghan's deputy, Michael Foot, narrowly won over former Chancellor of the Exchequer Denis Healey, 139 to 129.

== November 11, 1980 (Tuesday) ==
- The Athlit ram was discovered by a scuba diver in the waters off of the coast of Atlit in Israel, and proved to be an important archaeological find, because it was the first evidence for historians to confirm that ancient galley warships carried a battering ram that could be used to inflict damage as the galley was rowed back and forth. The age of the timbers used for the warship was discovered by radiocarbon dating to at least 270 BC. The bronze ram was 2.26 metres (7 ft 5 in) long, 95 centimetres (37 in) high and weighed 465 kilograms (1,025 lb).
- Comedian Ted Knight, known previously as part of the supporting cast The Mary Tyler Moore Show, became the star of his own situation comedy with the premiere of Too Close for Comfort on the ABC television network. After three seasons on ABC, the show had three more seasons as a syndicated TV series until Knight's death from cancer in 1986.

== November 12, 1980 (Wednesday) ==
- The U.S. space probe Voyager I made its closest approach to the planet Saturn at 2346 UTC, flying within 77,000 miles (124,000 km) of the planet's cloud-tops and sent the first high resolution images of Saturn back to scientists on Earth. On March 5, 1979, Voyager had made a flyby of the planet Jupiter. Among the findings made as the probe began sending data was that Saturn's rings consisted of at least "95 discrete rings" surrounding the planet. and a 15th moon Because the probe was roughly 950,000,000 miles (1.53×10^{9} km) from Earth, data required 85 minutes to reach the Earth.
- President Chun Doo Hwan of South Korea announced a list of 811 politicians who would be banned from holding public office for the next 7½ years, unable to serve before June 1, 1988.
- Born: Ryan Gosling, Canadian television and film actor and 2017 Golden Globe winner for Best Film Actor; in London, Ontario.
- Died: Andrei Amalrik, 42, Soviet Russian writer and dissident, was killed in an auto accident while in exile in Spain. Amalrik was driving toward the city of Guadalajara when he lost control of his vehicle on a slick roadway and swerved across the median into the path of an oncoming truck. His wife and two other passengers received only minor injuries.

== November 13, 1980 (Thursday) ==
- Stephen Breyer, a law professor at Harvard University, was nominated for his first federal judgeship, and confirmed by the U.S. Senate on December 9. Breyer would become an Associate Justice of the U.S. Supreme Court in 1994.
- Born: Monique Coleman, American film and television actress, in Orangeburg, South Carolina

== November 14, 1980 (Friday) ==
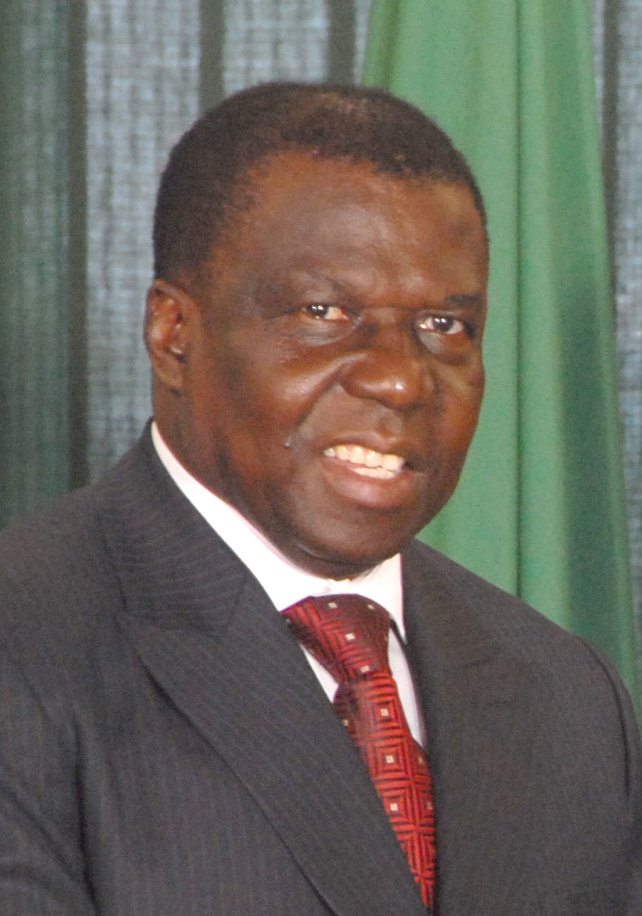
Bernardo Vieira

- The first successful tests of a nuclear pumped laser were conducted by scientists of the Lawrence Livermore National Laboratory in California.
- Luís Cabral, the first President of Guinea-Bissau since the West African nation's independence in 1973, was overthrown by his Prime Minister, Major João Bernardo Vieira. Cabral and his family were on vacation on the island of Bubaque at the time. Only four days earlier, the nation's parliament had approved a new constitution that gave additional powers to a president.
- Jeff Chandler won the World Boxing Association bantamweight championship at Miami, knocking out Julian Solis in the 14th round.

== November 15, 1980 (Saturday) ==
- Pope John Paul II arrived in Köln, becoming the first Roman Catholic Pontiff to visit Germany in almost 200 years. Celebrating mass at a nearby airfield at Butzweilerhof before an estimated 300,000 people, the Pope said that he had visited to honor "the entire German nation", both West Germany and East Germany. The last pontiff to visit Germany had been Pope Pius VI, who had traveled through Bavaria in 1782.
- Prosecutors in the People's Republic of China unsealed the indictment against the "Gang of Four", charging Mao Zedong's widow Jiang Qing, three accomplices and six other prominent radicals of causing the deaths of 34,380 people " during the Cultural Revolution during the late 1960s, and persecuting hundreds of thousands of other victims.
- NBC's late night sketch comedy series Saturday Night Live began its sixth season with a new producer, a completely new (and largely unknown) cast and a new team of writers while Lorne Michaels left his producer role for a year. The sixth season proved to be a disaster, with all of the cast fired at season's end in 1981 except for Eddie Murphy and Joe Piscopo.
- In college football, the Notre Dame Fighting Irish accepted an invitation to play in the 1981 Sugar Bowl postseason game after defeating Alabama, 7 to 0, while the #1 ranked Georgia Bulldogs effectively clinched the SEC championship and the automatic bid to the Sugar Bowl with a 31-21 win over the Auburn University Tigers. The expectation that Notre Dame would reach the #2 spot in the next wire service poll proved correct, setting up the expectation of a rare postseason bowl game between the #1 and #2 teams in the United States. Notre Dame would lose to USC three weeks later, however, turning the Sugar Bowl into a #1 vs. #7 matchup.

== November 16, 1980 (Sunday) ==
- At least 60 people were killed, and 400 others injured, in a series of explosions at an army munitions depot in Bangkok, the capital of Thailand. Prime Minister Prem Tinsulanonda blamed the blasts on a "chemical accident".
- French Marxist philosopher Louis Althusser, who had become increasingly erratic with severe mental illness, strangled his wife, sociologist Helene Rytmann, at their apartment on the campus of the École normale supérieure in Paris. A court concluded that he could not be criminally charged because of his insanity, and he was committed instead to a psychiatric hospital, where he remained for three years before his discharge.
- Died:
  - Jayan (Krishnan Nair), 42, action film star in India's Malayalam-language cinema industry, was killed during the filming of a scene for the disaster movie Kolilakkam (Shockwave). Jayan, who performed his own stunts, was at Sholavaram in the Tamil Nadu state and had made a successful take of the climactic scene, which called for the hero to ride a motorbike to catch up to and climb on to a hovering helicopter. He insisted on a second take of the same stunt, during which the helicopter veered off balance and crashed on top of him.
  - Boris Aronson, 82, Russian-born American scenic designer for the stage and six-time Tony Award winner

== November 17, 1980 (Monday) ==
- Seven people are killed and twelve are injured in shooting and bombing attack in Handan, Hebei, China. The perpetrator, a recently demoted police officer, is executed the following year.
- Canadian serial killer Clifford Olson killed his first victim, 12-year-old Christine Weller of Surrey, British Columbia. Over more than eight months, he killed 11 teenagers and children until his arrest on August 12, 1981.
- An agreement was reached between the U.S. and Palau, a set of islands that was part of the U.S. Trust Territory of the Pacific Islands. Under the terms of the 75-page document, the Republic of Palau became independent on January 1 with the right to manage its own internal and foreign affairs, while the U.S. pledged to be responsible for Palau's defense and security.
- John Lennon and Yoko Ono releases their fifth studio album Double Fantasy, it was his last regular studio album to be released during his lifetime before his sudden murder the following month.
- Died: Jorge Salazar Arguello, 41, Nicaraguan coffee entrepreneur and opponent of the nation's Sandinista government, was murdered by national security forces after being lured to a meeting that he thought would be with government opponents.

== November 18, 1980 (Tuesday) ==
- Two people are killed and five others are wounded in a mass shooting at several gay bars in New York City's Greenwich Village. The perpetrator, a former Transit Authority officer who cited homophobic motives, was found not guilty of murder by reason of insanity and involuntarily committed until his death in 2015.
- Born: Denny Hamlin, American NASCAR driver, in Tampa, Florida.
- Died: Conn Smythe, 85, Canadian businessman and NHL ice hockey executive who owned the Toronto Maple Leafs. At the time of his death, the NHL's Conn Smythe Trophy and the Smythe Division of the National Hockey League were named after him.

== November 19, 1980 (Wednesday) ==
- Heaven's Gate, one of the most unprofitable films in history, made its debut at New York City's Cinema 1 theater, and was disliked by nearly all critics. Produced by Joann Carelli and written and directed by Michael Cimino for United Artists, the Western film cost $44,000,000 to film and distribute, and would gross less than $3,500,000 at the box office. The original version had a running time of 3 hours, 39 minutes. On April 24, 1981, the film was re-released in more than 800 theaters in a version that was two-and-one-half hours long, and removed from circulation after two weeks.
- Korean Air Lines Flight 015 caught fire after making a rough landing at Seoul at the end of a flight from Los Angeles. Although 209 of the 226 people on board were able to evacuate, nine passengers and six crew were killed.
- Prime Minister of Israel Menachem Begin survived a vote of confidence by only three votes, the narrowest margin of 20 no-confidence motions filed against his government in 1980. The final result was 54 against the Begin government, and 57 in favor. Three days later, former Defense Minister Ezer Weizman, one of Begin's colleagues in the Herut Party who had voted against the government, was kicked out of Herut, and the Likud coalition lost its parliamentary majority of 61 of the 120 seats in the Knesset.
- Born: Adele Silva, English TV actress, in Norbury, London

== November 20, 1980 (Thursday) ==
- Lake Peigneur, a freshwater lake in Louisiana, was completely drained after an oil drilling rig inadvertently bored a hole into the roof of a salt mine. The Texaco oil company was doing exploratory drilling when it punctured the roof of the underground mine, operated by the Diamond Crystal Salt Company. All 50 miners working beneath the lake were able to escape, as well as the seven-man crew on the oil rig. As more water poured in, the 14-inch (36 cm) wide hole expanded into a sinkhole, eventually swallowing the drilling platform, eleven barge boats, a tugboat, and 65 acres (26 hectares) of surrounding land and trees.
- The Gang of Four trial began in China, after Mao Zedong's widow Jiang Qing, former Vice Premier Zhang Chunqiao, former Writers Union director Yao Wenyuan, and former Party Vice Chairman Wang Hongwen were indicted on 48 counts, along with six other prominent radicals. Conducted at the Ministry of Public Security in Beijing, the trial was closed to the foreign press.
- Forty-five people, mostly senior citizens, were killed in a fire at the four-story tall Kawaji Prince Hotel, a resort near Tōkamachi in the Niigata Prefecture, about 80 miles (130 km) north of Tokyo. The hotel had failed to mark exits and the 132-member staff had no training for fire emergencies.
- The United Nations General Assembly voted to call on the Soviet Union to withdraw its troops from Afghanistan, with 111 in favor and 22 against. The opposition was from the Soviet Union and its two UN members of the General Assembly (the Byelorussian SSR and the Ukrainian SSR), from the Communist nations of Eastern Europe, and from various Soviet allies around the world, including the Soviet-installed government in Afghanistan which requested that the Soviet troops remain.
- Died: John McEwen, 80, Prime Minister of Australia for three weeks in 1967 and 1968

== November 21, 1980 (Friday) ==
- Eighty-five guests died in a fire at the MGM Grand Hotel and Casino, and another 650 were injured. At the time, about 5,000 people were in the 26-story tall luxury hotel and casino. Fire broke out in one of the hotel's restaurants on the ground floor, The Deli, at 7:07 in the morning, then spread upward through the entire building. Fire investigators determined that an electrical fire started in an attic above the restaurant and smoldered for almost three hours, "not noticed until it burst through the ceiling of the delicatessen in a ball of flame"; it then swept back and witnesses reported that "the fiery ball... rolled across the casino, melting slot machines and devouring drapes and furnishings in its path." Eighteen people in the casino died, while others died of smoke inhalation and carbon monoxide poisoning as the fire spread between the 19th and 24th floors of the hotel. Most of the deaths were of people who were descending the stairs to escape the blaze.
- A record number of viewers at this date (for an entertainment program) tuned into the U.S. television show Dallas to learn who shot lead character J. R. Ewing (portrayed by Larry Hagman). The "Who shot J.R.?" event was an international obsession.
- Born:
  - Hiroyuki Tomita, Japanese artistic gymnast and 2005 world championship gold medalist; in Osaka
  - Elaine Yiu, Hong Kong TV and film actress, as Yiu Wai Ling in British Hong Kong
- Died: Sara García, 85, Mexican film actress

== November 22, 1980 (Saturday) ==
- Skydiver Kenneth W. Swyers landed onto the top of the Gateway Arch in St. Louis, Missouri after using his parasail to guide him. According to his friends, Swyers's intent was to pass directly underneath the structure and landing on the Arch was accidental. Seconds later, a stiff wind blew him sideways and dragged him and the parasail down the north side and he plunged 630 feet (190 m) to his death.
- Died:
  - Mae West, 87, pioneering American sex symbol and film actress
  - John W. McCormack, 88, U.S. Congressman for Massachusetts for 43 years from 1928 to 1971, and Speaker of the United States House of Representatives from 1962 to 1971

== November 23, 1980 (Sunday) ==
- A 6.9 magnitude earthquake in southern Italy killed 2,483 people and injured 8,934 others. The main shock, with an epicenter at Eboli, struck at 7:34 in the evening local time (1834 UTC). Among the casualties were over 100 people attending Mass at a Roman Catholic church in Balvano who were buried when the front wall collapsed as they were trying to get out.
- The U.S. men's soccer team defeated Mexico for the first time since 1934, and for only the second time overall. Playing in the rain before a crowd of only 2,126 people in Fort Lauderdale, Florida, the Americans won, 2 to 1 in a World Cup qualification game. Both goals came from Steve Moyers, a forward for the recently disbanded California Surf of the North American Soccer League. The U.S. team had already failed to qualify in the three-way round robin between the U.S., Canada and Mexico.
- Born: Jonathan Papelbon, American baseball relief pitcher and 2007 World Series champion with the Boston Red Sox, in Baton Rouge, Louisiana

== November 24, 1980 (Monday) ==
- The first elections for the 12-member Tobago House of Assembly were conducted as the small island received autonomy within the nation of Trinidad and Tobago. The Democratic Action Congress won 8 of the 12 seats.
- Born: Beth Phoenix (ring name for Elizabeth Kocianski Copeland), American professional wrestler; in Elmira, New York
- Died:
  - George Raft, 79, American film actor
  - Molly Reilly, 58, pioneering Canadian aviator
  - Mahmoud Khalil Al-Hussary, 63, Egyptian qāriʾ (a person who can recite verses from the Quran, verbatim and following the precise intonation requirements of tajwid)

== November 25, 1980 (Tuesday) ==
- In the long-awaited rematch for the world welterweight boxing championship in New Orleans between World Boxing Council champion Roberto Duran and former WBC champion Sugar Ray Leonard, whom Duran had defeated on June 20. The fight ended abruptly in the closing seconds of the eighth round when Duran quit the fight, reportedly telling referee Octavio Meyran "No más" (Spanish for "no more"), and Leonard reclaimed his WBC title.
- Earlier in the evening at the same card of fights Sugar De León won the WBC cruiserweight boxing title in a decision over Marvin Camel.
- Sangoulé Lamizana was overthrown in a coup d'état after almost 15 years as President of Upper Volta (now called Burkina Faso). The former Foreign Minister, Colonel Saye Zerbo, installed himself as president and prime minister, but would be overthrown in another coup after less than two years.
- An explosion killed 105 women and girls who were attending an engagement party in the Turkish village of Danaciobasi, about 55 miles (89 km) northeast of Ankara. As the party went past midnight, a power outage in the village led to the hosts using a canister of liquefied gas to provide illumination, unaware that the container was leaking. After an initial blast caused panic, a second massive explosion killed almost all of the people who had been unable to flee.
- In the Gang of Four trial of 10 defendants in Beijing, three former generals confessed to participating in a 1971 plot by former Defense Minister Lin Biao to assassinate Chinese Communist Party Chairman Mao Zedong. Huang Yongsheng, who had been Chief of Staff of the Army, and Li Zuopeng, the former political commissar of the Chinese Navy, said that they had passed privileged information to Mr. Lin that had led to the plot. The other general, former Nanjing political commissar Jiang Tengjiao, said he took part in a secret meeting with Lin's son Lin Liguo, who had organized the plot.

== November 26, 1980 (Wednesday) ==
- In a secret memorandum, East Germany's Communist Party leader Erich Honecker, the de facto leader of the country, asked the leaders of the other Warsaw Pact nations to invade Poland. "According to information that we are receiving through various channels," Honecker wrote to Soviet leader Leonid Brezhnev (with copies to the other Communist leaders), "counterrevolutionary forces are on a constant offensive in Poland. Any hesitation will mean death— the death of socialist Poland. Yesterday our collective measures might have been premature. Today they are necessary, but tomorrow they may be too late." In response, Brezhnev convened an emergency meeting of the Warsaw Pact on December 5, but the leaders agreed that military intervention would derail attempts to improve relations with non-Communist nations. The memo would not be discovered until 12 years later, after the fall of East Germany and its reunification under West Germany's jurisdiction.
- After nearly 20 years of trying, Sir Richard Attenborough succeeded in making real his Academy Award-winning film, Gandhi as filming began on location in India. Attenborough's classic 1982 movie about the life of the Mahatma Gandhi had its roots in a 1962 meeting with an Indian official, followed by years of getting approval from India's leaders, financial backing from investors, and the recruitment of screenwriters and cast.
- In the National Hockey League, the Vancouver Canucks turned a 3–2 lead over the Pittsburgh Penguins into 7–2 in less than 90 seconds. In the final period, four different Vancouver players got the puck past Pittsburgh's Greg Millen with goals at 2:07, 2:34, 3:05 and 3:30. The feat was four seconds short of the 1945 NHL record of four goals in 80 seconds
- Died: Rachel Roberts, 53, Welsh film and stage actress and twice winner of the BAFTA Award for Best British Actress, by suicide

== November 27, 1980 (Thursday) ==
- Six pedestrians were killed and 25 injured in Reno, Nevada when a woman intentionally ran over people on a sidewalk on the Nevada town's Virginia Street. At 3:00 in the afternoon on Thanksgiving Day, Ford drove her car 322 yards (294 m) along the sidewalk into crowds standing in front of Club Cal Neva, Harrah's and Harold's casinos. Five died at the scene while a sixth person died shortly after the arraignment of Priscilla Joyce Ford for murder and attempted murder. Ford reportedly told police that she had deliberately driven on the sidewalk to attack gamblers. On March 19, 1982, after a trial that lasted more than five months, a jury would reject Ford's defense of insanity and would convict her of six murders. The jury would later recommend a death sentence. She would die in prison in 2005.

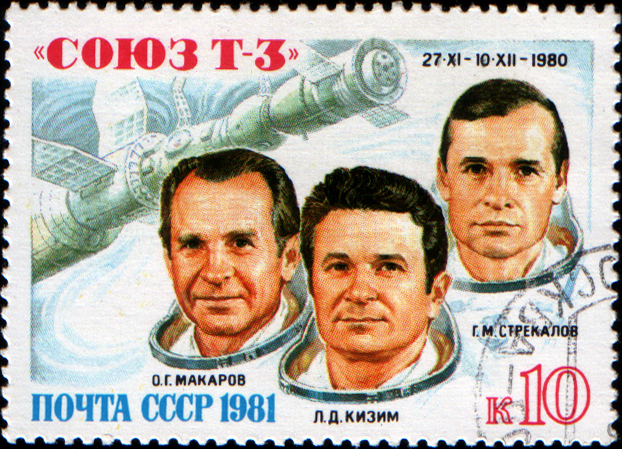
Makarov, Kizim and Strekalov

- Soyuz T-3 was launched by the Soviet Union and was the first Soyuz spacecraft with a three-member crew since the 1971 Soyuz 11 disaster. The team of Leonid Kizim, Oleg Makarov and Gennady Strekalov docked with the Salyut 6 space station in order to make repairs, and returned to Earth on December 11.
- In Tehran, the 49 American hostages held captive at the U.S. Embassy were evacuated from the embassy grounds and turned over to the Iranian government. The other three hostages had been held at the Iranian Foreign Ministry for more than a year.
- The situation comedy Bosom Buddies, the first major role for actor Tom Hanks, premiered in the U.S. on the ABC television network. Hanks and his co-star, Peter Scolari. The premise of the show, about two single men at an advertising agency "disguising themselves as women in order to live in the one apartment they could afford" in New York City required Hanks and Scolari to be "in drag" during the sequences when they were at home at an all-female hotel.

== November 28, 1980 (Friday) ==
- The first Yugo economy compact automobile was produced, rolling off of the assembly line of the Zastava Automobiles factory in Kragujevac, then a part of Yugoslavia's Serbian SR and now in Serbia. Based on the design of the Fiat 128, the car was marketed locally as the Koral (Serbo-Croatian for "coral"). Starting in 1985, the line of cars was marketed in the United States and the western hemisphere as the "Yugo" as a reference to its Yugoslavian manufacture.
- An opera based on the popular children's book Where the Wild Things Are, by Maurice Sendak, was given its first performance, premiering in Brussels at La Monnaie under the book's French title, Max et les Maximonstres (Max and the Maximonsters), with British soprano Jane Manning singing the role of Max, and six other singers in costume portraying the monsters.
- Ethiopia sent four MiG fighters across its border with Somalia and dropped bombs on the city of Dusa Mareb, roughly 50 miles (80 km) inside Somalia, destroying several houses and killing ten civilians. Somalia's Defense Ministry said that anti-aircraft guns had shot down two of the jets.
- The city of Big Bear Lake, California was incorporated in San Bernardino County and now has a population of about 5,300.
- Died:
  - Bernard Fergusson, Baron Ballantrae, 69, Governor-General of New Zealand from 1962 to 1967.
  - Kanji Swami, 90, celebrated Indian Jain philosopher

== November 29, 1980 (Saturday) ==
- Sixty opponents of Philippines President Ferdinand Marcos, including four former senators, were indicted by a military court in Manila and charged with conspiracy to overthrow the government and with carrying out 25 terrorist bombings since August. Roughly 20 of those charged were actually in custody. Remaining at large were former presidential candidates Benigno Aquino Jr.; Raul Manglapus and Sergio Osmena, Jr. Former Senator Jovito Salonga was placed under house arrest.
- Eddie Mustafa Muhammad (formerly Edward Gregory), the World Boxing Association (WBA) light-heavyweight champion, defended his title in a bizarre three-round technical knockout of Rudi Koopmans, the light-heavyweight champion of the European Boxing Union (EBU), despite the lack of many punches. In the bout at Los Angeles, Koopmans continually avoided Mustafa, who chased after him attempting to land a blow, based on Koopmans' apparent strategy to wear out the champ before throwing his first punch. In the third round, Koopmans sustained a deep cut over his left eye from a Mustafa right punch, and the ring physician stopped the fight. The result set up a "reunification bout" between Eddie Mustafa Muhammad and World Boxing Council (WBC) champion Matthew Saad Muhammad (formerly Matthew Loach) scheduled for February 21. Though Koopman claimed that the cut was caused by a headbutt from the champ, television replays confirmed that the wound was caused by a right cross hit.
- Born:
  - Jason Griffith, American voice actor known for the voice of Sonic the Hedgehog; in Lakeline, Ohio
  - Jiggly Caliente (stage name for Bianca Castro-Arabejo), Philippine-born American drag performer and entertainer; in San Pedro, Laguna(d.2025)
- Died: Dorothy Day, 83, American journalist and social activist within the Roman Catholic Church in the U.S.

== November 30, 1980 (Sunday) ==
- Voters in the South American nation of Uruguay overwhelmingly voted to reject a proposed constitution that would have made permanent the provision for the President to seek the approval of the military officers of COSENA (Consejo de Seguridad Nacional or National Security Council) in decisions, and a 28-officer Council of the Nation to serve in place of an elected legislature. The proposed charter was approved by less than 43% of the voters, with 57.2% of the votes (945,176 out of 1,689,424). A civilian government would finally replace the military government on March 1, 1985.
- A crew of Japanese researchers completed a voyage by sailboat to prove that "Japanese sailors could have contributed to South America's ancient culture", as the catamaran Yasei-Go (Japanese for "Wild Adventure") arrived in the port of Arica in Chile. In May, the Yasei-Go, built to specifications similar to those known for fishing boats in ancient Japan, had departed Shimoda, then followed Pacific Ocean currents east to North America and southward along South America. The expedition's captain, Kanzunohu Fujimoto, said "We have proved such a voyage can be made in a boat like those used by Japanese fishermen 5,000 years before Christ."
- George Rogers of South Carolina became the 1980 Heisman Trophy winner. that season he ran for 1,781 yards and a remarkable 6 yards per carry.
