= Tampomas II =

Indonesian passenger ship that caught fire in 1981

- Tampomas II on fire in 1981

History
- Name: Central No.6 (1971–1975); Emerald (1975–1980); Great Emerald (1980); Tampomas II (1980–1981)
- Owner: Central Ferry Co/Nichimen KK, Kobe (1971–1975); Arimura Sangyo KK, Kobe (1975–1980); Komodo Marine SA, Panama (1980); PT Pelayaran Armada Niaga Nasional, Jakarta (1980–1981)
- Builder: Mitsubishi Heavy Industries, Shimonoseki, Japan
- Launched: 20 August 1971
- Identification: IMO number: 7118428
- Fate: Caught fire 25 January 1981 and later sank

General characteristics
- Class & type: RORO car and passenger ferry
- Tonnage: 6153gt
- Length: 128.6 m (421 ft 11 in)
- Beam: 22.0 m (72 ft 2 in)
- Propulsion: 2 x diesel engines
- Speed: 19 knots (35 km/h; 22 mph)

KMP Tampomas II (Note: KMP is the Indonesian acronym for Kapal Motor Penumpang or "Motor Passenger Vessel") was a roll on-roll off car and passenger ferry owned by the Indonesian shipping company Pelni that burned and sank in the Java Sea while sailing from Jakarta to Ujung Pandang, South Sulawesi on 27 January 1981. This disaster resulted in the deaths of hundreds of passengers.

== Overview ==
Tampomas II, originally named Central No.6, was produced in 1971 by Mitsubishi Heavy Industries in Shimonoseki, Japan. It was a RoRo (Roll On-Roll Off) vessel of the screw-steamer type measuring 6153 GRT. The ship had a capacity of 1,500 passengers, with a maximum speed of 19.5 knots (36.1 km/h; 22.4 mph). It had a width of 22 metres (72 ft), height of 14 meters and a length of 128.6 metres (422 ft).

The ship was purchased by PT. PANN (Pengembangan Armada Niaga Nasional or National Commercial Fleet Development) from Comodo Marine Co. SA, Japan for $8.3 million (USD), and then Pelni repurchased it from PT. PANN on a ten-year lease contract. Many were confused at the high price of this ship, because it was offered to other private liner companies for only $3.6 million (USD). Various parties, including Japan, stated that the ship was no longer seaworthy because it was already 10 years old at the time of the purchase. Once operated, this ship was directly assigned to serve the routes Jakarta–Padang and Jakarta–Ujung Pandang, which were the busiest routes at that time. Every time the ship made port, it was only given a four-hour break before sailing again. Repairs and routine maintenance on the ship's machinery and equipment was done in a perfunctory fashion considering its age.

However, despite the substandard maintenance, the maiden voyage of Tampomas II was set for 2 June through 13 June 1980. A number of journalists and members of the House of Representatives were invited to join the voyage. On this cruise, several members of the House had witnessed and also had questions about the engine that had broken down several times during the trip. A Member of Parliament from the PDI party, Ahmad Soebagyo, mentioned various irregularities during the cruise, including the ship was circling in the same radius due to the malfunctioning of its engine automatic regulator buttons and the cancellation of a show event on the ship due to a prolonged electrical failure. According to a reporter, the engine broke down six times during the voyage.

== Disaster ==
Tampomas II departed from Tanjung Priok harbor on Saturday, 24 January 1981, at 07:00, and was estimated to arrive in Ujung Pandang on Monday, January 26, 1981, at 22:00 local time. A pilot skipper mentioned that one of the ship's engines had broken down before its departure.

The ship was carrying dozens of motor vehicles, including a SAKAI steam roller, Vespa scooters, etc., which were parked on the car deck. The manifest mentioned 200 motor cars, 1,055 registered passengers and 82 crew members on board. The estimated total passengers, including stowaways, was 1442.

Around 20:00 on 25 January, at 114°25'60"E, 5°30'0"S, near the Masalembu Islands in the Java Sea (in the administrative area of East Java Province), and in stormy weather, some parts of the engine developed fuel leaks, and cigarette butts coming down from the vents ignited the leaking fuel. Crew-members saw the fire and tried to snuff it out using portable fire extinguishers, but failed. The fire grew larger in the engine compartment because of the open deck doors, and caused a power cutoff for two hours. The emergency generator failed, and all efforts to extinguish the fire were halted because it was deemed impossible. Subsequently, fuel in the tanks of passengers' vehicles ignited, causing the fire to spread and resulting in all of the decks rapidly burning up. Thirty minutes after the fire started, the passengers were ordered to go to the upper deck and board the lifeboats. However, the evacuation process went slowly because there was only one door to the upper deck. Once they got to the upper decks, none of the crew nor the ship's officers directed them to the lifeboats. Some of the crew members lowered the lifeboats for themselves. There were only six lifeboats, each with a capacity of only 50 people. Some passengers desperately dived into the sea, and some frantically waited for rescue.

The first ship to conduct a rescue mission was the KM Sangihe, skippered by Captain Agus K. Sumirat. Sumirat had been Abdul Rivai's classmate in the class of 1959 when they were studying at Akademi Ilmu Pelayaran (Maritime Academy). Sangihe was travelling from Pare-pare to Surabaya for engine repairs. Sangihe's first deck officer, J. Bilalu, was the first to see a puff of smoke to the west and thought the smoke was coming from Pertamina's offshore oil rig. Sangihe's wireless operator, Abu Akbar, sent an SOS message at 08:15. KM Ilmamui joined the rescue effort at 21:00, followed four hours later by the tanker Istana VI and other ships, including Adhiguna Karunia and PT. Porodisa Line's KM Sengata.

In the morning of 26 January, the Java Sea was hit by torrential rain. The fire began to spread to the engine room, where there was unisolated fuel. As a result, in the morning of 27 January, there was an explosion in the engine room which created an entrance for the sea water to fill the compartments. The generator and the propeller room filled with seawater, which resulted in the ship developing a 45° list.

Finally, at 12:45 on 27 January (about 30 hours after the first spark), the ship sank to the bottom of the Java Sea, along with 288 people still occupying the lower decks.

The Captain of the ship, Abdul Rival, was the only crew member to help evacuate those on board; he sent a message to the skipper of Sangihe, "Please send me water and food, because I am going to stay on the ship until the last minute". The message was conveyed through Bakaila, a crew member who successfully crossed over to Sangihe. But the request was not fulfilled, and Rival died during the sinking.

== Victims ==
Early reports were that 757 people had been rescued and 439 died (143 recovered bodies and 294 missing), totalling 1196, in excess of the 1137 officially on board. However, the loss of life was likely to have been much higher (666 was suggested), due to the sale of unauthorised tickets as well as stowaways.

== Investigation ==
The Minister of Transportation, Roesmin Nurjadin, in his explanation to the press, said that an abnormal thing happened in the engine room. The disorder occurred in the vehicle deck space, especially on a two-wheeled vehicle located in the rear, when a shock wave from the sea that was strong enough to raise sparks and allow a fire to spread. Machinist Wishardi Hamzah said that Tampomas II did not have a smoke detection system. An investigation was opened in January 1981 by the Jakarta Harbourmaster.

The investigation, led by Attorney Bob Rush Efendi Nasution, did not provide meaningful results, because all errors were blamed on the crew. There is an impression that this case was intentionally covered up by the government at that time, although many in parliament demand a more serious investigation.

== Response ==
In a TV broadcast on 29 January, the Governor of South Sulawesi Andi Oddang declared three days of mourning and instructed the populace to lower flags to half-mast.

== In popular culture ==
- Iwan Fals created a song about the sinking entitled "Celoteh Camar Tolol dan Cemar" ("Babble of Foolish and Blackened Seagulls")
- Ebiet G. Ade created a song about the sinking entitled "Sebuah Tragedi 1981" ("A 1981 Tragedy"), found on the album "Langkah Berikutnya ("Next Step"), which was published in 1982

== See also ==
List of maritime disasters
