= U.S. prime rate =

Interest rate that most American banks charge their most creditworthy clients

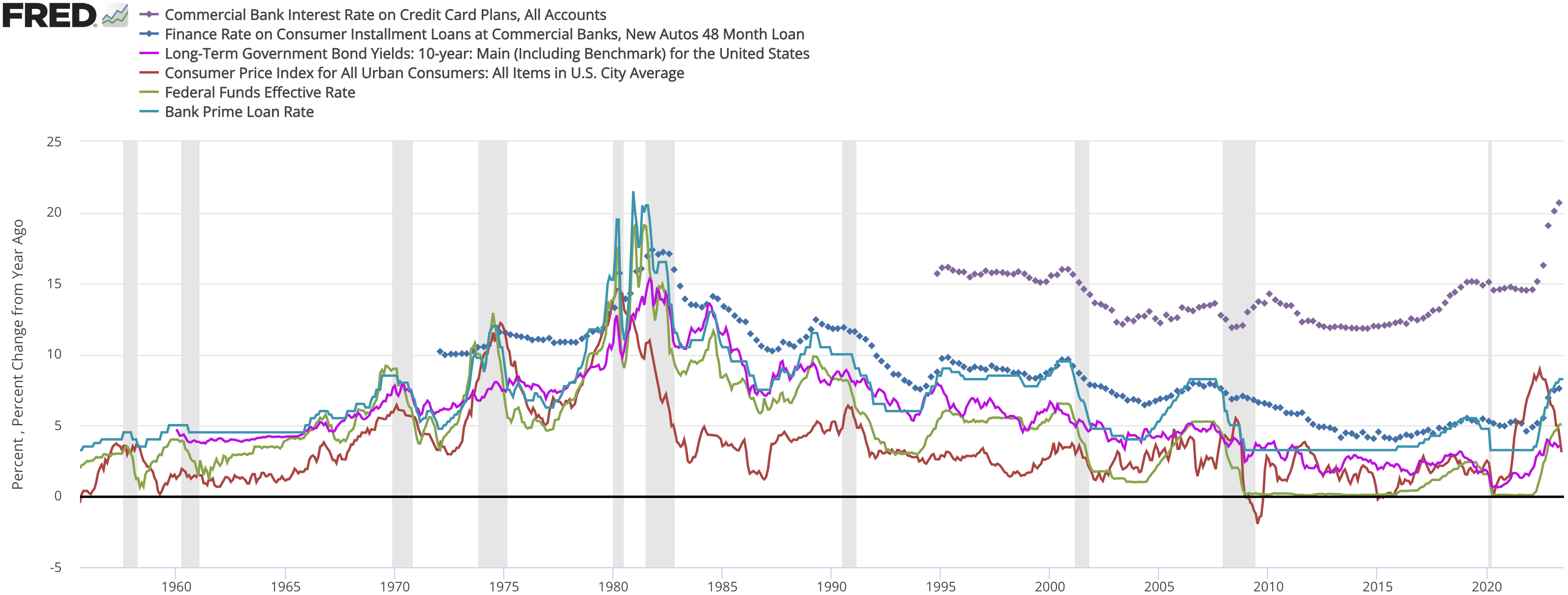
Prime Rate floats about 3% above the Federal Funds Rate Credit card interest rates Auto loan interest rate 48 months new autos Prime Rate 10 year Treasury bond United States Consumer Price Index Federal funds rate

The U.S. prime rate is in principle the interest rate at which a supermajority (three-fourths) of American banking institutions grant loans to their most creditworthy corporate clients. As such, it serves as the de facto floor for private-sector lending, and is the baseline from which common "consumer" interest rates are set (e.g. credit card rates). Traditionally, the rate is set to approximately 300 basis points (3 percentage points) over the federal funds rate. The Federal Open Market Committee (FOMC) meets eight times per year wherein they set a target for the federal funds rate.

In the United States, the prime rate is traditionally established by the Wall Street Journal. Every major bank sets its own prime rate. When 7 out of the 10 largest US banks change their prime rate, the Journal publishes a new prime rate.

== Uses ==
The prime rate is used often as an index in calculating rate changes to adjustable rate mortgages (ARM) and other variable rate short term loans. It is used in the calculation of some private student loans. Many credit cards with variable interest rates have their rate specified as the prime rate (index) plus a fixed value commonly called the spread.

== Wall Street Journal prime rate ==
WSJ Prime Rate Changes

The Wall Street Journal Prime Rate (WSJ Prime Rate) is a measure of the U.S. prime rate, defined by The Wall Street Journal (WSJ) as "the base rate on corporate loans posted by at least 70% of the 10 largest U.S. banks". It is not the "best" rate offered by banks. It should not be confused with the discount rate set by the Federal Reserve, though these two rates often move in tandem.

The print edition of the WSJ is generally the official source of the prime rate. The Wall Street Journal prime rate is considered a trailing economic indicator. Many (if not most) lenders specify this as their source of this index and set their prime rates according to the rates published in the Wall Street Journal. Because most consumer interest rates are based upon the Wall Street Journal Prime Rate, when this rate changes, most consumers can expect to see the interest rates of credit cards, auto loans and other consumer debt change.

The prime rate does not change at regular intervals. It changes only when the nation's "largest banks" decide on the need to raise, or lower, their "base rate". The prime rate may not change for years, but it has also changed several times in a single year.

=== Historical data for the WSJ prime rate ===
2001–2014
Date of Change	Prime Rate
2001 (4.75% - 9.00%)
04-Jan-01	9.00%
01-Feb-01	9.50%
21-Mar-01	9.00%
19-Apr-01	9.50%
16-May-01	9.00%
28-Jun-01	6.75%
22-Aug-01	6.50%
18-Sep-01	6.00%
03-Oct-01	5.50%
07-Nov-01	5.00%
12-Dec-01	4.75%
2002 (4.25% - 4.75%)
07-Nov-02	4.25%
2003 (4.00% - 4.25%)
27-Jun-03	4.00%
2004 (4.00% - 5.25%)
01-Jul-04	4.25%
11-Aug-04	4.50%
22-Sep-04	4.75%
10-Nov-04	5.00%
14-Dec-04	5.25%
2005 (5.25% - 7.25%)
02-Feb-05	5.50%
22-Mar-05	5.75%
03-May-05	6.00%
30-Jun-05	6.25%
09-Aug-05	6.50%
20-Sep-05	6.75%
01-Nov-05	7.00%
13-Dec-05	7.25%
2006 (7.25% - 9.00%)
31-Jan-06	7.50%
28-Mar-06	7.75%
10-May-06	9.00%
29-Jun-06	8.25%
2007 (7.25% - 8.25%)
18-Sept-07	7.75%
31-Oct-07	7.50%
11-Dec-07	7.25%
2008 (3.25% - 7.25%)
22-Jan-08	6.50%
30-Jan-08	6.00%
18-Mar-08	5.25%
30-Apr-08	5.00%
08-Oct-08	4.50%
30-Oct-08	4.00%
16-Dec-08	3.25%
2009 - 2014 (3.25%)

2015–present
Date of Change	Prime Rate
2015 (3.25% - 3.50%)
17-Dec-15	3.50%
2016 (3.50% - 3.75%)
15-Dec-16	3.75%
2017 (3.75% - 4.50%)
16-Mar-17	4.00%
15-Jun-17	4.25%
14-Dec-17	4.50%
2018 (4.50% - 5.50%)
22-Mar-18	4.75%
14-Jun-18	5.00%
27-Sep-18	5.25%
20-Dec-18	5.50%
2019 (4.75% - 5.50%)
01-Aug-19	5.25%
19-Sep-19	5.00%
31-Oct-19	4.75%
2020 (3.25% - 4.75%)
04-Mar-20	4.25%
16-Mar-20	3.25%
2021 (3.25%)
2022 (3.25% - 7.50%)
17-Mar-22	3.50%
05-May-22	4.00%
16-June-22	4.75%
28-July-22	5.50%
22-Sep-22	6.25%
03-Nov-22	7.00%
15-Dec-22	7.50%
2023 (7.75% - 8.50%)
02-Feb-23	7.75%
23-Mar-23	8.00%
04-May-23	8.25%
27-Jul-23	8.50%
2024 (7.50% - 8.50%)
19-Sep-24	8.00%
08-Nov-24	7.75%
19-Dec-24	7.50%
2025 (7.00% - 7.50%)
18-Sep-25	7.25%
30-Oct-25	7.00%
11-Dec-25	6.75%
