= July 1981 =

Month of 1981

<<	July 1981					>>
Su	Mo	Tu	We	Th	Fr	Sa
			1	2	3	4
5	6	7	8	9	10	11
12	13	14	15	16	17	18
19	20	21	22	23	24	25
26	27	28	29	30	31

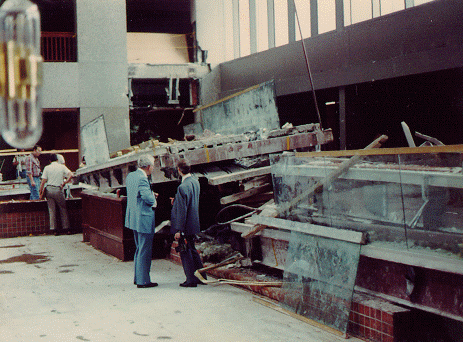
July 17, 1981: 114 killed in Hyatt Regency Hotel collapse in Kansas City

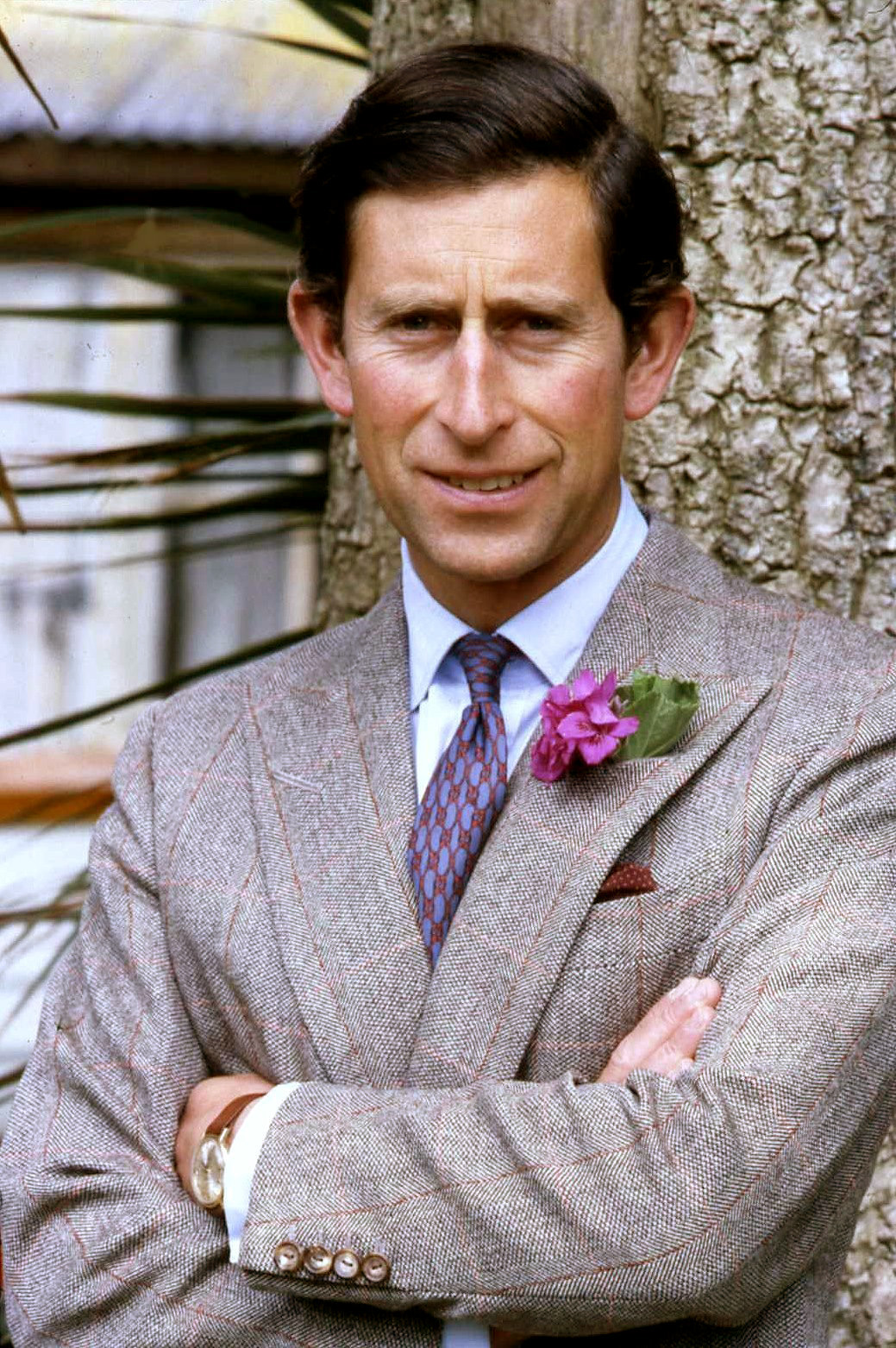
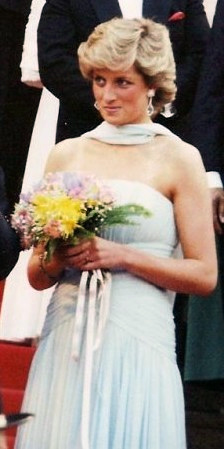
July 29, 1981: Prince Charles marries Diana Spencer in British royal wedding

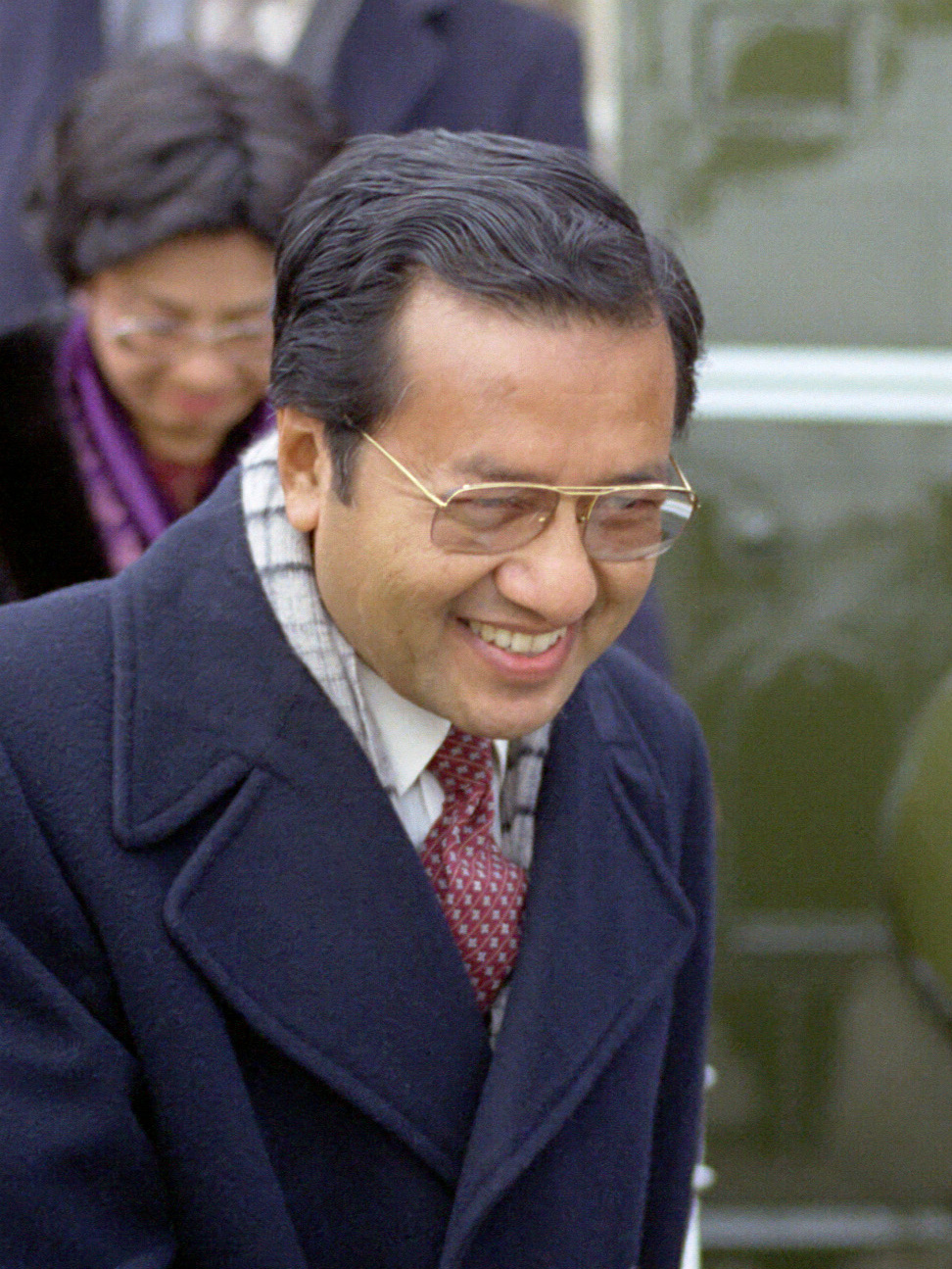
July 16, 1981: Mahathir Mohamad becomes the Prime Minister of Malaysia

July 27, 1981: Microsoft buys rights to MS-DOS, the secret to its success

The following events occurred in July 1981:

== July 1, 1981 (Wednesday) ==
- Typhoon Kelly struck the Philippines and killed more than 150 people in and around Legaspi City.
- The Canadian Union of Postal Workers walked out on strike at midnight. Mail delivery would be halted for six weeks, finally resuming on August 11.
- Eastern Airlines Flight 984 was scheduled to depart Guatemala City for Miami at 3:30 pm, but mechanical problems delayed the takeoff. As baggage was being prepared for loading on the Boeing 727, a time bomb exploded inside one of the suitcases at 4:15, when the jet would have been in flight over the Caribbean.
- Andrija Artukovic, Nazi collaborator who had served as the Minister of the Interior for the Independent State of Croatia before taking up residence at Seal Beach, California, was ordered deported to Yugoslavia to stand trial for war crimes.
- Four bodies were found in a home at 8763 Wonderland Avenue in the hills above Los Angeles, along with a seriously injured woman. All five had been bludgeoned with a steel pipe. Neighbors had heard screams earlier in the morning, but nobody called the police until 12 hours later. Pornographic movie star John Holmes and nightclub owner Eddie Nash were both indicted for the killings; both were acquitted.

== July 2, 1981 (Thursday) ==
- The United States Supreme Court ruled unanimously that then-President Jimmy Carter had acted within his authority in ending the Iran hostage crisis when he agreed in the Algiers Accords to release frozen Iranian assets no later than July 19, in return for the release of 52 American hostages from Iran. The decision, made only 8 days after the Court heard arguments, cleared the way for $2.3 billion to be transferred from U.S. banks to Iran. Earlier on the same day, eight of the former hostages sued Iran in federal court, seeking $5,000,000 apiece, despite a waiver of the right to sue as part of the same accords.

== July 3, 1981 (Friday) ==
- Chris Evert Lloyd defeated Hana Mandlíková in straight sets, becoming the first woman in 14 years to win the singles championship at Wimbledon without losing a single set. In seven matches, she lost only 26 games.
- A race riot began in Southall, London, as a group of white "skinheads" clashed with British Asians. The next day, black British youths in the Toxteth section of Liverpool fought with police, and within a week, disturbances would break out in other English cities.
- The New York Times became the first major newspaper to report on the existence of AIDS, with a report on page 20, headlined "Rare Cancer Seen in 41 Homosexuals". Initially referred to as "GRID" (for "Gay Related Immune Disorder"), the illness would later be named Acquired Immune Deficiency Syndrome. The news, picked up by CNN the next day, was based on an article in the Morbidity and Mortality Weekly Report, entitled "Kaposi's Sarcoma and Pneumocystis Pneumonia Among Homosexual Men- New York City and California".
- Died:
  - Ross Martin, 61, American TV actor best known as Artemus Gordon on The Wild Wild West. Born as Martin Rosenblatt in Poland, Martin was playing tennis at Ramona, California, when he collapsed.
  - Chen Wen-chen, 31, an assistant mathematics professor in the United States at Carnegie Mellon University in Pittsburgh, was killed by security police during a vacation in his homeland in Taiwan.

== July 4, 1981 (Saturday) ==
- Kenji Urada, an employee at the automated Kawasaki Heavy Industries factory, became what was reported as the first person to be killed by a robot. However, an American worker, Robert Williams of the Ford Motor Company plant in Flat Rock, Michigan, had been killed by a robot two years earlier, on January 25, 1979.
- After losing the first set, 4–6, to Björn Borg, John McEnroe won the men's singles championship at Wimbledon with three straight sets (7-6, 7–6 and 6-4), but not without outraging his hosts at the All England Lawn Tennis and Croquet Club by his outbursts against the officials.
- The first gay pride event in Britain was held outside London for the first time in solidarity with the Gemini Club in Huddersfield West Yorkshire. The event also featured the first national Pride march beginning at Leeds Road.

== July 5, 1981 (Sunday) ==
- After initial doubts about whether his Likud party had been defeated by the Labor Party of Shimon Peres, Prime Minister Menachem Begin was able to declare victory in the closest election in the history of Israel. Under the Israeli system of government, representation in Parliament was based upon the proportion of the overall balloting. With 718,941 votes, Likud had 37.1% for 48 seats, while the 708,356 for Labour was 36.6% for 47 seats, giving Begin the right to assemble the coalition in the 120-seat Knesset.
- Rajan Mahadevan recited pi to 31,811 digits before an audience in Mangalore. The event took 3 hours and 49 minutes, including a total of 26 minutes of breaks, and was sponsored by the local Lions Club International, Lion Seva Mandir. The record would stand until 1987, when Hideaki Tomoyoni repeated the first 40,000 digits.
- Died:
  - Pedro Henrique of Orléans-Braganza, 71, Brazilian farmer and claimant to the throne of the abolished monarchy of Brazil as great-grandson of Dom Pedro II, the last Emperor, who had been deposed in 1889. Pedro's son, Brazilian chemist Luiz Orléans-Braganza, became the new claimant to the throne.
  - Manuel Urrutia Lleó, 81, former President of Cuba who was installed, and later deposed, by Fidel Castro following the 1959 Revolution

== July 6, 1981 (Monday) ==
- On trial in Los Angeles under accusation of being the Hillside Strangler, Kenneth Bianchi took the witness stand in his own defense. After initially denying his involvement in the slayings of ten young women, Bianchi unexpectedly began a detailed confession and calmly described each of the murders in detail.

== July 7, 1981 (Tuesday) ==
- Infosys, a worldwide outsourcing and information technology service, was founded in Maharashtra, India.
- Piloted by Stephen Ptacek, the Solar Challenger, an airplane powered entirely by the sun, crossed the English Channel. Built by Paul MacCready, the plane, covered with 16,128 solar cells, took off from France at Cormeilles-en-Vexin, then traveled 160 miles (260 km) in 5 hours and 23 minutes and landed in England at RAF Manston, landing at 4:47 p.m.
- "I'm pleased to announce that upon completion of all the necessary checks by the Federal Bureau of Investigation, I will send to the Senate the nomination of Judge Sandra Day O'Connor of the Arizona Court of Appeals for confirmation as an Associate Justice of the United States Supreme Court." With those words, U.S. President Ronald Reagan named O'Connor as the 102nd person, and first woman, to ever serve on the Supreme Court of the United States.
- Born: MS Dhoni (Mahendra Singh Dhoni), Indian cricketer, in Ranchi, Bihar state (now Ranchi, Jharkhand state)
- Died: Peace Pilgrim (Mildred Norman), 72, American pacifist who attracted attention to her causes by walking across the United States; in an auto accident near Knox, Indiana

== July 8, 1981 (Wednesday) ==
- Lt. Adriano Bomba of Mozambique flew a Soviet-built MiG-17 jet fighter into South Africa and then signaled to intercepting forces that he wished to surrender. Bomba, a black African defector, was given asylum by the white minority government that ruled the nation during the apartheid era, in return for military intelligence.
- During an arson attack on a bus depot in Belfast in Northern Ireland, 16-year-old Catholic John Dempsey became the first of two teenagers in two days to be killed by British Army snipers. The next day, Danny Barrett, 15, was killed by a British soldier.
- Born: Anastasia Myskina, Russian tennis player, 2004 French Open winner; in Moscow
- Died: Irish Republican Joe McDonnell, 29, at the Long Kesh Internment Camp after a 61-day hunger strike

== July 9, 1981 (Thursday) ==
- Donkey Kong, a video game created by Nintendo, was released. The game marked the debut of Nintendo's then-future mascot, Mario.
- The Minitel videotex system for the general public was given its first test, in the town of Vélizy, France, before being taken nationwide.
- Died:
  - Ruth Brooks Flippen (born Ruth Albertina Brooks), 59, American television and motion picture screenwriter, 1975 Emmy Award winner
  - Meyer Levin, 75, American Jewish novelist

== July 10, 1981 (Friday) ==
- The Israel Defense Forces began a regular bombardment of Palestine Liberation Organization strongholds in Lebanon. The siege escalated after the Palestinian guerillas began shelling Israeli settlements. Until a July 24 ceasefire, 450 Palestinians and Lebanese, and 6 Israelis, died.
- Ken Rex McElroy was murdered in Skidmore, Missouri by several unknown gunmen as a group of 60 people, frustrated with McElroy's continued violations of the law, gathered. The example of vigilante justice would later be recounted in books and a made-for-TV movie. Although the U.S. Department of Justice believed that it had identified the shooter, it would drop its investigation 14 months later on September 2, 1982.
- The Bhagwan Shree Rajneesh, cult leader from India, purchased a 39-square-mile (100 km^{2}) ranch near Antelope, Oregon and named the haven Rajneeshpuram.

== July 11, 1981 (Saturday) ==
- Rioting in the UK reached its height, with thousands of people fighting with police in cities across England. In addition to London, violence flared in Liverpool, Birmingham, Sheffield, Nottingham, Hull, Manchester, Preston and Newcastle-upon-Tyne.
- The Writers Guild of America ended its 13-week strike, which had begun on March 2.

== July 12, 1981 (Sunday) ==
- Three days of torrential rains began in China's Sichuan Province, with up to 18.8 inches (480 mm) raising the level of the Yangtze River and its tributaries as much as 16.5 feet (5.0 m). Initial reports from the Xinhua news agency reported 3,000 deaths and 100,000 injuries. The official numbers would be revised two weeks later, but the toll was still high, with 753 dead, 558 missing, 28,140 injured and 1.5 million people left homeless.

== July 13, 1981 (Monday) ==
- American track and field athlete Ben Plucknett, the world record holder for the discus throw, was banned for life by the International Association of Athletics Federations, after his urine tested positive for anabolic steroids. Plucknett's July 7 record of 237 feet 4 inches (72.34 m), and an earlier mark of 233 feet 7 inches (71.20 m), were stricken, and the official world record reverted to the 233 feet 5 inches (71.15 m) mark set by Wolfgang Schmidt of East Germany.
- Troopers Merle J. Cook and Robert L. Pruitt and Corporal Cleo L. Tomlinson, Jr., of the Florida Highway Patrol died on duty in an aircraft accident while searching for two burglary suspects.
- Born: Ágnes Kovács, Hungarian swimmer, in Budapest
- Died: Irish Republican Martin Hurson, 24, at the Long Kesh Internment Camp after a 46-day hunger strike

== July 14, 1981 (Tuesday) ==
- Max Hugel, a millionaire who had been appointed by CIA Director William Casey to serve as Deputy Director for Clandestine Operations despite having "no visible qualifications", resigned hours after The Washington Post broke a story headlined, "Spymaster Is Accused of Improper Stock Practices".

== July 15, 1981 (Wednesday) ==
- Aspartame, the artificial sweetener marketed as NutraSweet, was approved for sale in the United States by the Food and Drug Administration. Initially, the product was cleared only for use at home, but would later be approved as a food additive.

== July 16, 1981 (Thursday) ==
- Mahathir Mohamad was sworn in as the fourth Prime Minister of Malaysia. Mahathir would serve for 22 years, retiring in 2003.
- Died: Harry Chapin, 38, folk singer and hunger activist, was killed in a car wreck near Jericho, New York on the Long Island Expressway. Chapin had shifted lanes into the path of a Rickel Home Centers truck, which was unable to avoid a collision with his car, and died of a ruptured aneurysm caused by the impact. Chapin's death came at 12:29 p.m., seven-and-a-half hours before he was scheduled to perform in a free outdoor concert at Eisenhower Park at East Meadow. A jury later found Chapin to be 40% at fault in the accident, with the driver primarily liable, and awarded $7,200,000 to his widow.

== July 17, 1981 (Friday) ==
- The Nissan Motor Company announced that it was phasing out the name "Datsun" for its cars and trucks sold outside Japan.
- More than 300 people were killed and 800 injured when aircraft from Israel bombed a residential area in West Beirut, where the headquarters of the Palestine Liberation Organization in Lebanon was based. Ten apartment buildings were destroyed. Most of the victims were civilians.
- The collapse of a hotel walkway killed 114 people at the Hyatt Regency Hotel in Kansas City, Missouri. At 7:05 pm, a fourth floor walk at the hotel broke from its moorings and dropped onto a second floor walk directly below, and then both structures fell into the hotel lobby. All three areas were crowded with people who had gathered for a dance. In addition to the 114 who died, 185 more were injured. Ultimately, the disaster was traced to a flaw in design and construction. While the original plan had been for the two walkways to hang separately, nuts and bolts intended to bear the weight of the fourth floor were holding the weight of both. The failure of a single nut under the stress led to the chain reaction.

== July 18, 1981 (Saturday) ==
- Jack Henry Abbott, a convicted murderer turned author of the bestseller In the Belly of the Beast, had been paroled in June with the influence of author Norman Mailer. Abbott and two friends walked into a Manhattan cafe called Binibon, where he got into an argument with Richard Adan over use of a restroom. Abbott stabbed Adan to death and then fled the scene. Ironically, Abbott's return to crime took place as the praise of his book was being printed in that Sunday's New York Times Book Review. Abbott would be captured two months later, convicted of the murder, and spend the rest of his life in prison until hanging himself in 2002.

== July 19, 1981 (Sunday) ==
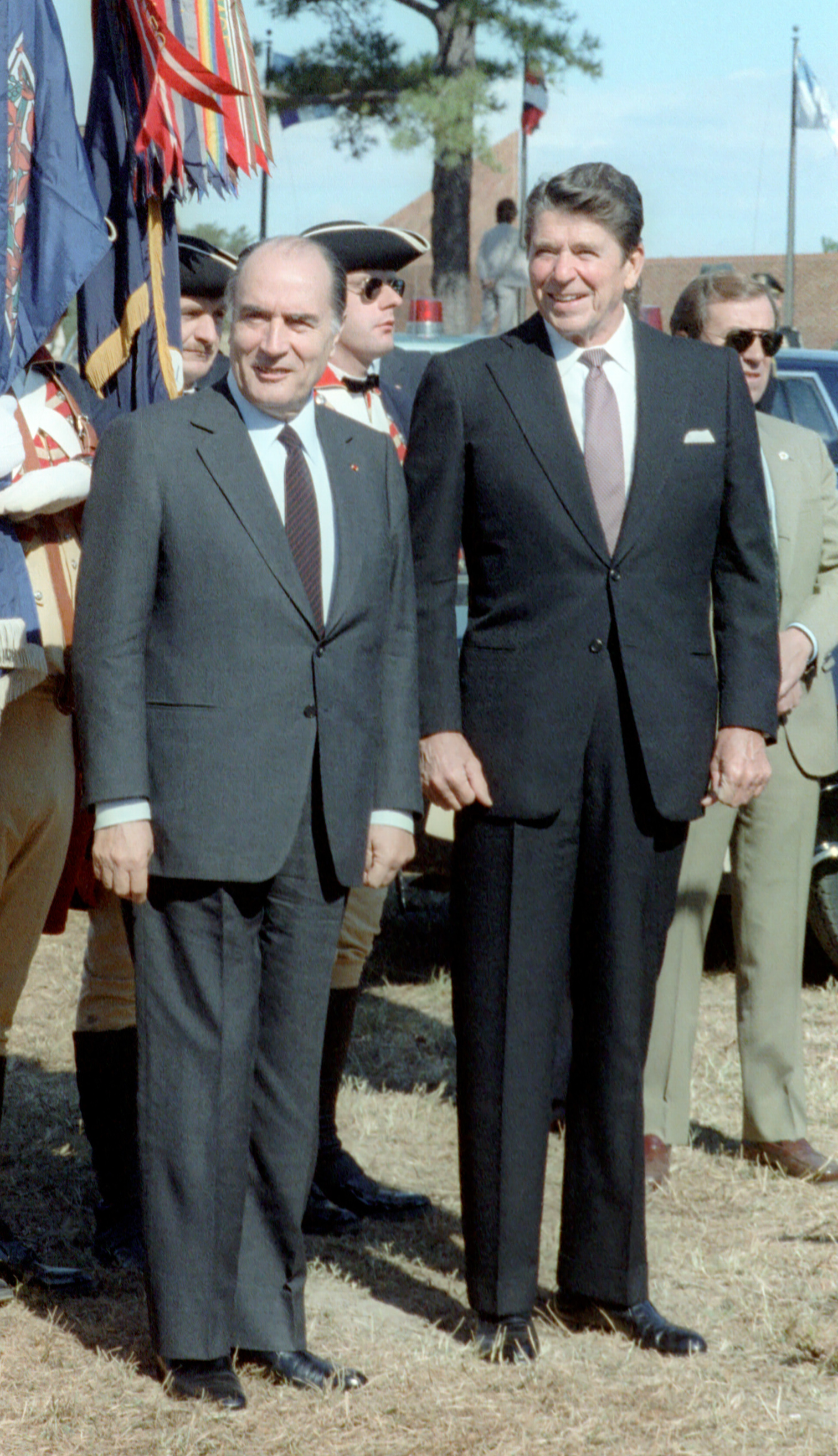
Presidents Mitterrand and Reagan

- The existence of the "Farewell Dossier", 4,000 pages of Soviet documents that had been supplied to France by former KGB Colonel Vladimir Vetrov (whose code name was "Farewell") was revealed to U.S. President Ronald Reagan by French President François Mitterrand at the summit of Western leaders in Ottawa. The material showed that the Soviets had, after years of infiltration, been stealing American technological research and development. While other advisers to the National Security Council were looking for ways to stop the leaks, Gus Weiss proposed the idea of creating defective technology and allowing it to be stolen. The first trial was for computer programs which, months after being applied to operate the Siberian gas pipeline, began to fail. (A critic notes that the USSR did not have computer-managed gas pipelines in the 1980s and that claim is highly improbable.) The existence of the Farewell Dossier would remain a secret until 1997.

== July 20, 1981 (Monday) ==
- David Alan Kirwan, a 24-year-old tourist at Yellowstone National Park, jumped into the alkaline (pH 9) and scalding (202 °F (94 °C)) Celestine Pool to save his friend's dog. The dog died within moments and its body dissolved in the hot spring. Kirwan, blinded and burned over his entire body, was airlifted to Salt Lake City and died the next day.
- Martina Navratilova became an American citizen at a ceremony in Los Angeles. Until then, the women's tennis star, who had defected from Czechoslovakia, had lived in fear that she would be kidnapped and returned for trial.
- Died: Lou Peters, Cadillac dealer from Lodi, California, whose cooperation with the FBI led to the conviction of organized crime leader Joe Bonanno earlier in the year. The Bureau named the Louis E. Peters Memorial Service Award in his honor.

== July 21, 1981 (Tuesday) ==
- Tohui the Panda was born in Chapultepec Zoo in Mexico City, the first giant panda ever to be born and survive in captivity outside of China. Tohui was the second child of Ying Ying, who accidentally crushed her first one.
- The U.S. Postal Service, the American Postal Workers Union and the National Association of Letter Carriers reached a $4.8 billion agreement and averted the threatened walkout of 500,000 post office employees. The prior contract had expired at 12:01 the day before, but workers remained on the job as negotiations continued.
- The International Cricket Conference (ICC) admitted Sri Lanka as its eighth full member (after Australia, England, India, New Zealand, Pakistan, South Africa, and the West Indies), making the team eligible for Test cricket competition.

== July 22, 1981 (Wednesday) ==
- FTC Commissioner Michael Pertschuk announced the most comprehensive regulations ever applied to the American funeral industry, ending deceptive practices after a nearly ten-year study. Among the changes were a requirement for funeral homes to itemize their prices, and a prohibition against a common practice of requiring the bereaved to buy a casket even for a cremation.
- Mehmet Ali Agca was sentenced to life imprisonment for his attempt to assassinate Pope John Paul II on May 13.

== July 23, 1981 (Thursday) ==
- A coal mine fire, burning since May 27, 1962, broke to the surface in the town of Centralia, Pennsylvania. Condemning and buying all the property in the town was less expensive than trying to extinguish the fire, so the 1,000 residents of Centralia were relocated over the next several years. The virtual ghost town had 20 residents by 2003.
- An artificial heart was implanted into a human being for the second time in history (the first was in 1969), as Dr. Denton Cooley placed the Akutsu-III into Willibrord Meuffels, a 26-year-old Netherlands man undergoing bypass surgery at St. Luke's Episcopal Hospital in Houston. Meuffels remained on the TAH for 55 hours until receiving a donor heart, dying from complications ten days later.
- Died:
  - Harvey Fletcher, 96, American inventor and pioneer in acoustical engineering.
  - Kazuo Taoka, 68, Japanese organized crime boss who built the Yamaguchi-gumi gang into Japan's largest yakuza group

== July 24, 1981 (Friday) ==
- In one of the largest alleged UFO sightings, thousands of people in China claimed to have observed a bright object surrounded by "Saturn-like rings" in Tibet, flying for seven minutes. China's official Xinhua News Agency reported the story eleven days later.
- American mediator Philip Habib brokered a cease-fire between Israel and the PLO, temporarily halting the Lebanese Civil War.
- Kosmos 1275, a Soviet satellite that had been launched on June 4, was struck by debris while in orbit 600 miles (970 km) over Alaska, breaking into more than 140 pieces of space junk.
- Born: Nayib Bukele, President of El Salvador since 2019; in San Salvador

== July 25, 1981 (Saturday) ==
- Anti-apartheid protestors in Hamilton, New Zealand forced the cancellation of the second game of the 16 game tour by the South African national rugby union team (the Springboks) and the host team, Waikato. Before the scheduled match could begin, 300 protestors occupied the field at Rugby Park, despite the presence of 4,700 police. The game was cancelled at 3:10 pm after word was received that a pilot had stolen a Cessna plane and was flying toward the stadium, which was crowded with 27,000 fans. Nevertheless, the controversial tour continued with a game four days later at Wellington.
- The very first World Games, a quadrennial international competition for non-Olympic sports, began in Santa Clara, California. Organized by Hal Uplinger, the events would run until August 3.
- Born: Yūichi Komano, Japanese soccer football defender with 78 caps for the Japan national team in Kainan, Wakayama Prefecture

== July 26, 1981 (Sunday) ==
- After six years, the FBI brought "Operation Donnie Brasco" to an end. Undercover agent Joseph D. Pistone had infiltrated the Bonanno crime family starting in 1975, using the alias Donnie Brasco and gathering evidence for the Bureau. When the family's boss, Dominic Napolitano, asked Pistone to carry out a hit against Bruno Indelicato, his FBI handlers decided that Pistone/Brasco would be discovered. Only after Pistone's assignment ended did FBI agents inform Napolitano that his trusted aide had been an informant. Napolitano would be killed by the Bonanno mob on August 17 for making the mistake.
- Swelled by a downpour that had happened hours earlier and far upriver, the Tanque Verde Falls in Arizona was the site of a flash flood that killed eight people without warning.
- Born: Maicon (Maicon Douglas Sisenando), Brazilian soccer football player, in Novo Hamburgo

== July 27, 1981 (Monday) ==
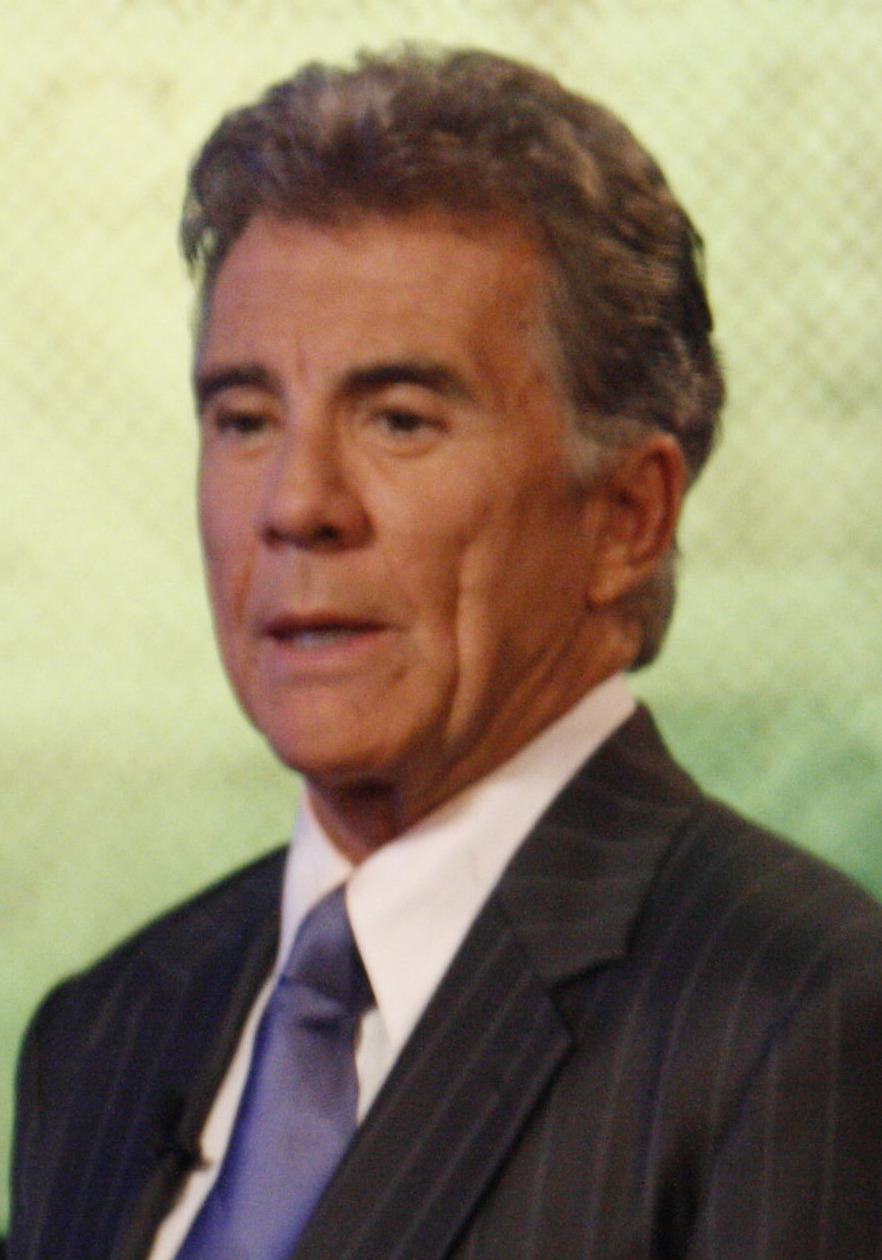
John Walsh

- Adam Walsh, age 6, was kidnapped from a Sears store in Hollywood, Florida, and murdered. His father, hotel executive John Walsh, became an activist for missing children and for crime prevention, and would later become host for the television program America's Most Wanted. Serial killer Ottis Toole, who confessed to the crime in 1983 and then recanted, died in 1996. Investigators concluded in 2008 that Toole had been the perpetrator and closed the case.
- Rod Brock, owner of Seattle Computer Products and of the 86-DOS disk operating system designed by one of its former employees (Tim Paterson), sold all rights to the program to Microsoft for $50,000. Renamed MS-DOS, the system earned Microsoft billions of dollars.
- In a nationally televised speech, President Reagan explained, in simple terms, his proposal for the largest tax cut in U.S. history, and asked for the public to "contact your Senators and Congressmen. Tell them of your support for this bipartisan proposal." Americans followed suit, and two days later, the bill passed the House 238–195, and the Senate 89–11.
- Betty Danielowski of Minnesota and her 9-year old nephew slipped from a rock and fell into Upper McDonald Creek in Glacier National Park in the U.S. state of Montana, and her husband Donald Danielowski jumped in to save them both, and the couple both drowned in the swift current. The child was saved by his father. The Danielowski's deaths were the second and third in less than a week in the same creek. Five days earlier, on July 22, a 7-year old child, Kevin Dolack of Glenview, Illinois, died after falling into the creek upstream.
- The perigee of the Moon, its shortest distance from the Earth, coincided with the week that the Earth, Moon and Sun were aligned. During the total solar eclipse that happened on Friday, July 31, the Moon occluded more of the view of the Sun than usually occurs during an eclipse.
- Born: Li Xiaopeng, Chinese gymnast, 4-time Olympic gold medalist, world championships in vault (1999, 2002, 2003) and parallel bars (1998, 2002, 2006), in Changsha
- Died:
  - Paul Brunton (pen name of Raphael Hurst), 81, British mystic
  - Douglas Crofut, 38, American industrial radiographer who was the first person to commit suicide by deliberate radiation poisoning. The U.S. Nuclear Regulatory Commission concluded that Crofut had exposed himself to gamma rays after stealing a capsule of iridium-192 from his workplace.
  - William Wyler (born Willi Wyler), 79, American film director and winner of 3 Oscars (The Best Years of Our Lives, Mrs. Miniver and Ben-Hur)

== July 28, 1981 (Tuesday) ==
- An earthquake of magnitude 7.3 struck the Kerman province of Iran, around Shahdad. Initial death estimates were as high as 5,000 people, but the United Nations later concluded that 1,500 had died in the sparsely populated province.
- Died:
  - Father Stanley Rother, 46, American missionary who had been a Roman Catholic priest in Santiago Atitlán, Guatemala, for 13 years, was murdered by Guatemalan soldiers.
  - Rolf Wütherich, 54, mechanic who had been passenger with James Dean in Dean's fatal car accident on September 30, 1955. Like Dean, Wütherich was killed while driving a Porsche at high speed, losing control in the German village of Kupferzell.

== July 29, 1981 (Wednesday) ==
- A worldwide television audience of over 750 million people watched the Wedding of Charles, Prince of Wales, and Lady Diana Spencer at St Paul's Cathedral in London.
- The Molesworth Street protest occurred in Wellington, New Zealand, where police batoned anti-Tour protesters who were reacting to the 1981 South Africa rugby union tour of New Zealand.
- Abolhassan Banisadr and Massoud Rajavi escaped Iran to Evreux, near Paris.
- Trevor Revell, 35-year-old magician and escape artist, was killed while performing at a Royal Wedding celebration in Portsmouth, England. Revell, buckled into a straitjacket, was hoisted 30 feet (9.1 m) into the air on a rope which was then set on fire. Revell escaped from the straitjacket, but the rope burned through before Revell could be lowered, and he fell headfirst onto concrete. Revell died at Queen Alexandra Hospital.
- Born: Fernando Alonso, Spanish race car driver, Formula One world champion in 2005 and 2006; in Oviedo
- Died: Robert Moses, 92, American urban planner who oversaw the growth of New York City and Long Island

== July 30, 1981 (Thursday) ==
- Dawda Jawara, the President of the Gambia, was deposed in a coup while a guest at the royal wedding in Britain. Kukoi Sanyang declared himself leader of the West African nation, but was driven out when the surrounding nation of Senegal intervened with 3,000 troops and restored Jawara to power. Later in the year, the two nations agreed to form the Senegambia Confederation, a merger that lasted ten years.
- An airplane crash killed three law enforcement officers in Pittsburg County, Oklahoma, while they were searching for marijuana fields from the sky. Ronnie Fox and detective David J. Sheehan of the McAlester, Oklahoma police, and the pilot, Oklahoma narcotics agent Bill Morgan, died after the aircraft went down in the Jack Fork foothills of the Ouachita Mountains. Investigators considered, but ruled out, the possibility that the plane had been shot down.
- Born:
  - Nicky Hayden, American motorcycle racing champion, in Owensboro, Kentucky (died 2017, cycling accident)
  - Hope Solo, American soccer goalkeeper and a two-time Olympic gold medalist, in Richland, Washington
- Died: Fernando Paz Castillo, 88, Venezuelan poet, literary critic, diplomat, and educator. He received the National Prize for Literature in 1967.

== July 31, 1981 (Friday) ==
- A total solar eclipse was visible over much of northern Asia, from Turkey to the Soviet Union and much of Mongolia, China and Japan. Because the Moon had made its closest approach to Earth only four days earlier, the diameter of the Moon as it occluded the view of the Sun was greater than would normally have been seen.
- The end of the 1981 Major League Baseball strike was announced in New York by federal mediator Kenneth Moffett, after major league owners and players came to an agreement. The All-Star game, set for August 9 in Cleveland, would mark the return of baseball, and regularly scheduled games would resume on August 10.
- Died:
  - Joe Gqabi, 52, African National Congress representative in Zimbabwe and former member of the Umkhonto we Sizwe, was assassinated as he backed out of his driveway in Harare; decades later, the Ukhahlamba district of South Africa would be renamed in his honour.
  - General Omar Torrijos, 52, military leader of Panama, and head of state from 1972 to 1978. Torrijos and six other people had taken off from Penonomé in a storm, bound for Coclesito, and the plane crashed into the Cerro Julio mountain.
