= Crofut =

Crofut is a surname. Notable people with the surname include:

- Bill Crofut (1935–1999), American musician
- Douglas Crofut (1942–1981), American radiographer
