= June 1981 =

Month of 1981

<<	June 1981					>>
Su	Mo	Tu	We	Th	Fr	Sa
	1	2	3	4	5	6
7	8	9	10	11	12	13
14	15	16	17	18	19	20
21	22	23	24	25	26	27
28	29	30

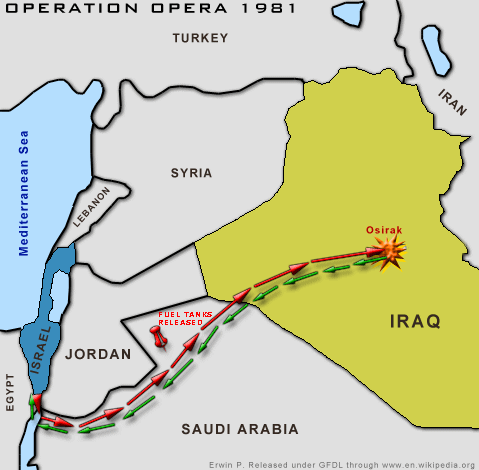
June 7, 1981: Israeli surprise attack destroys Iraqi nuclear reactor.

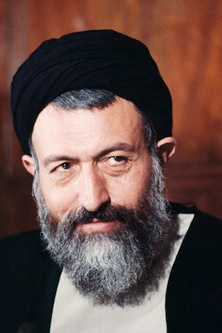
June 28, 1981: Time bomb kills Iran's leader Ayatollah Beheshti and 73 other leaders.

The following events occurred in June 1981:

== June 1, 1981 (Monday) ==
- A mobile laser weapon, intended to destroy missiles in flight, failed in testing by the U.S. Air Force at the United States Naval Weapons Center at China Lake in California. The high-intensity laser had been fired, from a flying KC-135A Stratotanker (similar to a Boeing 707), at a Sidewinder missile that was moving at 2,000 miles per hour (3,200 km/h). "The test failed," said Colonel Bob O'Brien, "and we don't know why."
- The first issue of China Daily, an English language newspaper operated by the Chinese Communist Party, was published. A sister paper to the official Chinese language People's Daily, the paper gave a nod to capitalism by carrying advertising.
- Born: Carlos Zambrano, pitcher for the Chicago Cubs and 3-time winner of Silver Slugger Award; in Puerto Cabello, Venezuela
- Died: Carl Vinson, 97, U.S. Congressman (D-Ga.) from 1914 to 1965, who was known as "The Father of the Two-Ocean Navy" for his successful efforts in expanding the U.S. Navy during the 20th century.

== June 2, 1981 (Tuesday) ==
- Ron Settles, 21, running back for California State University, Long Beach, was found hanged in his jail cell, three hours after he had been stopped in Signal Hill, California, for speeding, then booked on other charges. A coroner's jury later ruled 5-4 that the death was not a suicide. Represented by Johnnie Cochran, Settles's parents sued the city and eventually settled the case in January 1983 for $1,000,000.
- Died: Rino Gaetano, 30, Italian singer-songwriter, of injuries in an auto accident

== June 3, 1981 (Wednesday) ==
- Wayne Williams, 23, was taken into custody by the FBI, at his home at 1817 Penelope Road N.W. in Atlanta. Though not arrested, Williams was questioned for almost 12 hours by agents investigating the "Atlanta child murders" of 28 young people, most of them children. Released the next morning, Williams was questioned by reporters and his name became known worldwide. He remained free, though under surveillance, until his arrest on June 21, when he was charged with the murder of 27-year-old Nathaniel Cater.
- Died: Carleton S. Coon, 76, American anthropologist and archaeologist

== June 4, 1981 (Thursday) ==
- James Earl Ray, who allegedly committed the assassination of Martin Luther King Jr., was stabbed 22 times by four of his fellow inmates at the Brushy Mountain State Penitentiary near Petros, Tennessee. Ray survived the murder attempt, and went on for many years before dying on April 23, 1998, thirty years after the King assassination. Although Ray refused to identify the attackers, three African-American prisoners were later convicted of the attempt and had at least 20 years added to their prison sentences.

== June 5, 1981 (Friday) ==
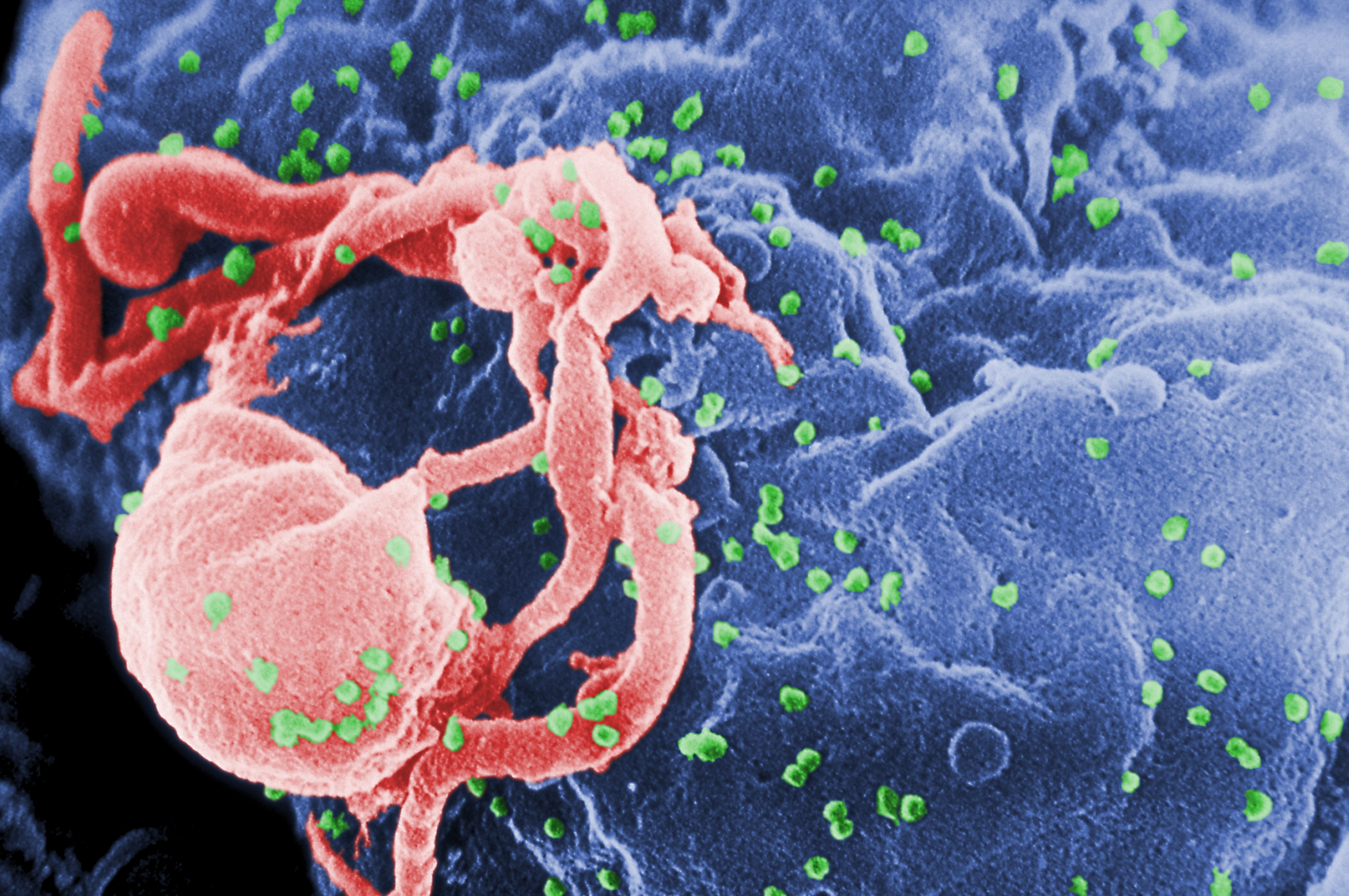
The AIDS virus, HIV

- The Centers for Disease Control and Prevention reported that 5 homosexual men in Los Angeles, California have a rare form of pneumonia seen only in patients with weakened immune systems (the first recognized cases of AIDS).

== June 6, 1981 (Saturday) ==
- Hundreds of train passengers were killed when seven cars of an overcrowded train fell off the tracks into the Bagmati River in India's Bihar state. Although initial estimates placed the death toll as high as 3,000 people, the figure would later be revised to about 800. The train had been en route from Banmankhi to Samastipur, carrying passengers inside and on the roofs of its cars, and the engineer reported that he had stopped on the bridge after seeing a cow on the tracks. At the same time, heavy winds tipped the cars, five of which were swept downriver.

== June 7, 1981 (Sunday) ==
- In carrying out its Operation Opera (also known as Operation Babylon), the Israeli Air Force destroyed Iraq's Osirak nuclear reactor in a raid that lasted 1 minute and 20 seconds. Eight F-16 jet fighters and six F-15s took off from the Etzion Airbase at 3:55 pm in Israel, arriving over the target in Iraq at 6:35 pm local time. Timed for a Sunday evening when more than 100 foreign scientists would be off for the day, the attack killed ten Iraqis and one Frenchman. Among the pilots was Ilan Ramon, who would later become Israel's first astronaut and would die on the last voyage of the space shuttle Columbia. Israel's Prime Minister Menachem Begin defended the raid despite worldwide condemnation, saying "There will never be another Holocaust in the history of the Jewish people. Never again, never again."
- Born:
  - Anna Kournikova, Russian tennis player, in Moscow
  - Larisa Oleynik, American actress (The Secret World of Alex Mack), in Santa Clara, California

== June 8, 1981 (Monday) ==
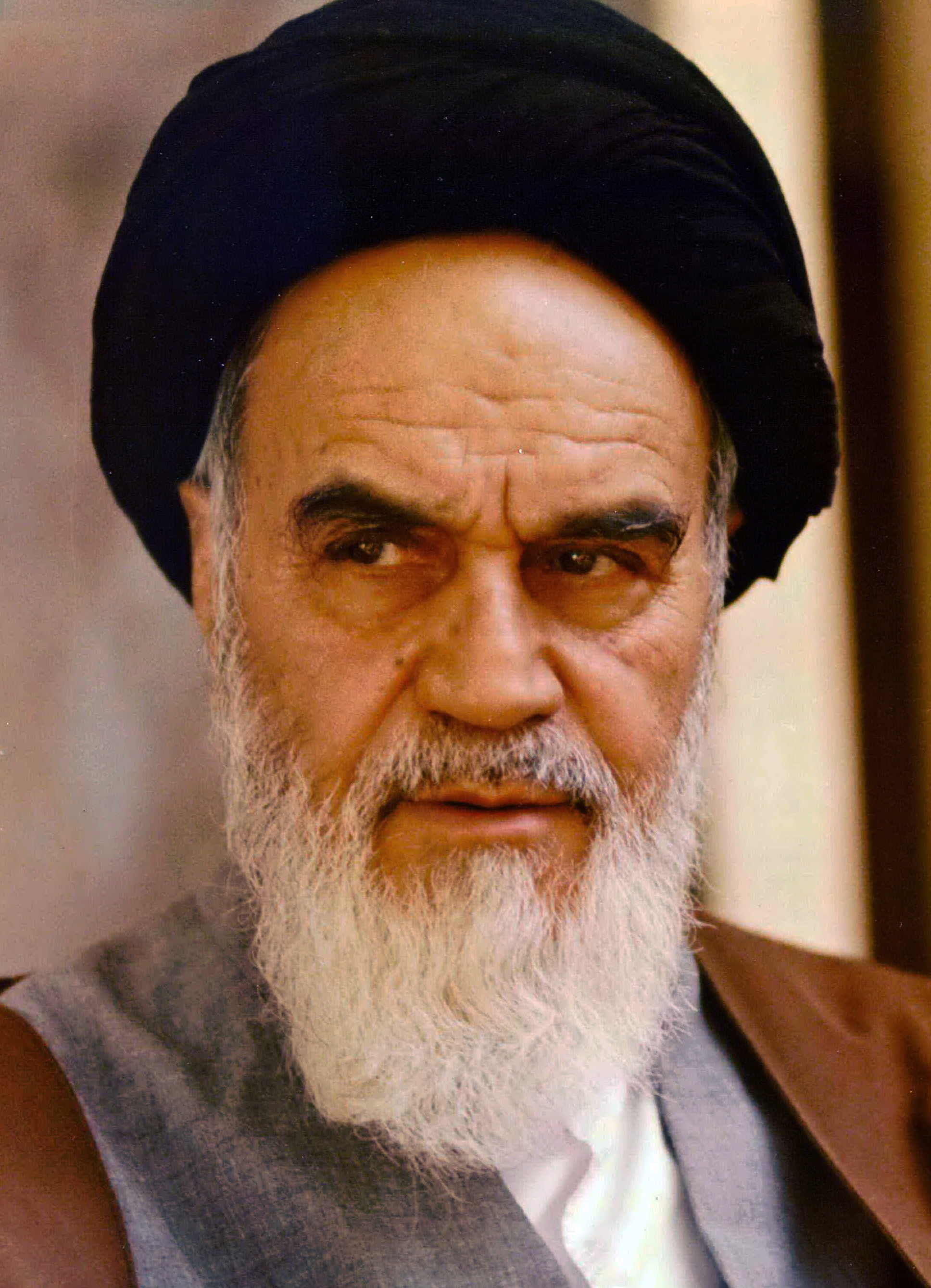
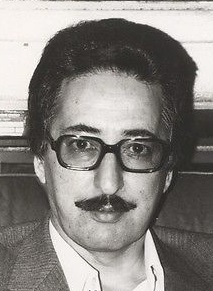
Iran's leader Khomeini and President Banisadr
- Iran's President, Abulhassan Banisadr made a speech at the Iranian Air Force base in Shiraz, exhorting officers and airmen to "resistance of dictatorship". The speech outraged Iran's de facto leader, the Ayatollah Khomeini, who removed Banisadr from command of the armed forces two days later. Banisadr went into hiding on June 12 as opponents called for his execution, finally escaping to France on July 29. Many of his supporters were arrested and executed in the months that followed the critical speech.
- By a vote of 4–2, the council of the city of Morton Grove, Illinois, passed ordinance No. 81-11, prohibiting the possession of handguns within city limits, and for residents to turn in their weapons to police

== June 9, 1981 (Tuesday) ==
- United Auto Workers President Douglas Fraser announced that UAW officials had voted unanimously to rejoin the AFL-CIO after a 13-year absence. In 1968, Walter Reuther had led the UAW to separate from the larger labor union after disagreements with AFL-CIO President George Meany.
- Born: Natalie Portman, Israeli-born American film actress, as Natalie Hershlag, in Jerusalem
- Died: Allen Ludden, 63, American game show host (Password), and husband of comedian Betty White

== June 10, 1981 (Wednesday) ==
- Six-year-old Alfredo Rampi fell into an unprotected artesian well while playing on a neighbor's property in Frascati, Italy. Over the next three days, the nation, and later the world, followed the attempt to save the boy's life. At one point, a rescuer was within reach of Alfredo, but the boy slipped 100 feet further down the well. By Saturday, Alfredo had died, and the property owner was arrested. The little boy's body was recovered on July 11.
- Died: Jenny Maxwell, 39, American film actress, murder victim

== June 11, 1981 (Thursday) ==
- A 6.8 earthquake struck Iran's Kerman province at 10:56 am local time, destroying the town of Golbaf and killing 1,027 people.
- In parliamentary elections in Ireland, The political party Fianna Fáil, led by Taoiseach (Prime Minister) Charles Haughey, lost its majority in the 166 seat Dáil Éireann. The Fine Gael assembled a coalition, and its leader, Garret FitzGerald, was elected the new Taoiseach by the Dáil on June 30, beating Haughey by a thin 81-78 margin.

== June 12, 1981 (Friday) ==
- Major League Baseball players began a strike at midnight. The first of 713 games to be cancelled was the 1:35 pm game between the Chicago Cubs and the visiting San Diego Padres. The last game before the walkout, the Seattle Mariners' 8–2 win over the visiting Baltimore Orioles, had ended at 9:54 pm local time on June 11. The strike would last until August 1.
- Raiders of the Lost Ark, which would become the highest-grossing film of the year, premiered in the United States, and subsequently was released in other nations.
- Born: Adriana Lima, Brazilian model, in Salvador, Bahia

== June 13, 1981 (Saturday) ==
- At the Trooping the Colour ceremony in London, 17-year-old Marcus Sarjeant fired six shots at Queen Elizabeth, who was riding on horseback. The gun was a cartridge pistol that fired blanks, and the Queen was able to bring her startled horse, "Burmese", under control, but the act demonstrated the vulnerability of Britain's reigning monarch. Serjeant, who testified that he had been unable to obtain a real pistol prior to the event, was convicted under the Treason Act 1842, and spent three years in jail, before quietly being released in October 1984. He subsequently changed his name and began a new life.
- Born: Chris Evans, American film actor (Captain America), in Sudbury, Massachusetts
- Died: George Walsh, 92, American silent film leading man

== June 14, 1981 (Sunday) ==
- The California Medfly Crisis began with a mistake made in the implementation of sterile insect technique, a means of controlling insect populations by releasing sterile bugs to mix with fertile ones of the same species during breeding season, thereby lowering the number of new larvae. When an infestation of millions of the Mediterranean fruit flies began destroying crops throughout the state, the California Department of Food and Agriculture discovered that the flies released on June 14 weren't sterile, and that the effort to reduce the population had inadvertently increased it.
- Voters in Switzerland, where women were not allowed to vote in national elections until 1971, approved an equal rights amendment to that nation's Constitution.

== June 15, 1981 (Monday) ==
- The State of Oklahoma forgot to execute convicted murderer James William White, who had been sentenced to die by lethal injection, in what would have been the first use in the United States of that form of capital punishment. A reporter from the UPI made a phone call to Oklahoma's Court of Criminal Appeals the next day to inquire about White's status. The Court discovered that nobody had filed an appeal required by state law, and that the state corrections department had incorrectly listed White's sentence as 999 years rather than death.
- In an 8–1 decision, the United States Supreme Court held in the case of Rhodes v. Chapman (452 U.S. 337) that the placing of two prison inmates in a cell designed for one was not a violation of the Eighth Amendment protection against cruel and unusual punishment, as long as overall conditions at the prison were adequate. The Court reversed rulings at the district and appellate court level in a class action lawsuit brought by inmates of the Southern Ohio Correctional Facility in Lucasville, Ohio.

== June 16, 1981 (Tuesday) ==
- U.S. Secretary of State Alexander Haig announced that the United States would, for the first time, sell weapons to the People's Republic of China.

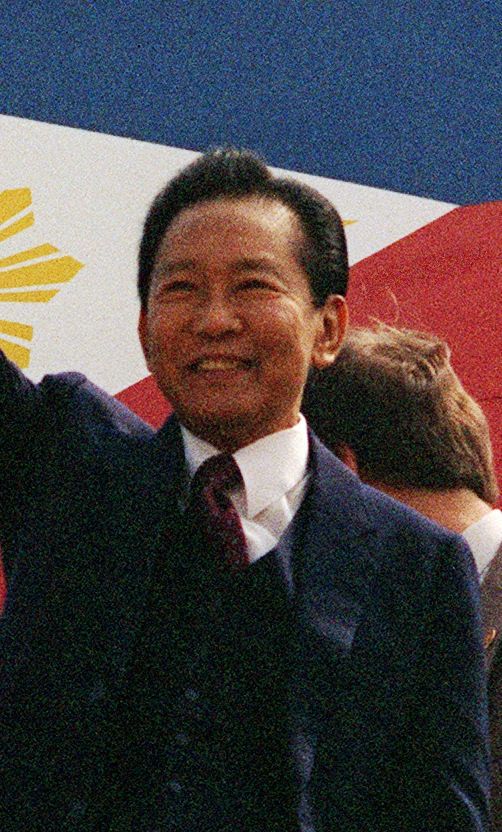
President Marcos

- Ferdinand Marcos was re-elected to a new six-year term as President of the Philippines, receiving a reported 18,309,360 votes, 86% of the total number cast. Alejo Santos had the highest total of eleven other candidates, with 1,716,499 or roughly 10%.
- Stanko Todorov, who had been Prime Minister of Bulgaria since 1971, was replaced by Grisha Filipov
- Died:
  - Jule Gregory Charney, 64, American meteorologist and mathematician
  - Edward Boatner, 83, African-American concert singer
  - John S. Knight, 86, American newspaper publisher

== June 17, 1981 (Wednesday) ==
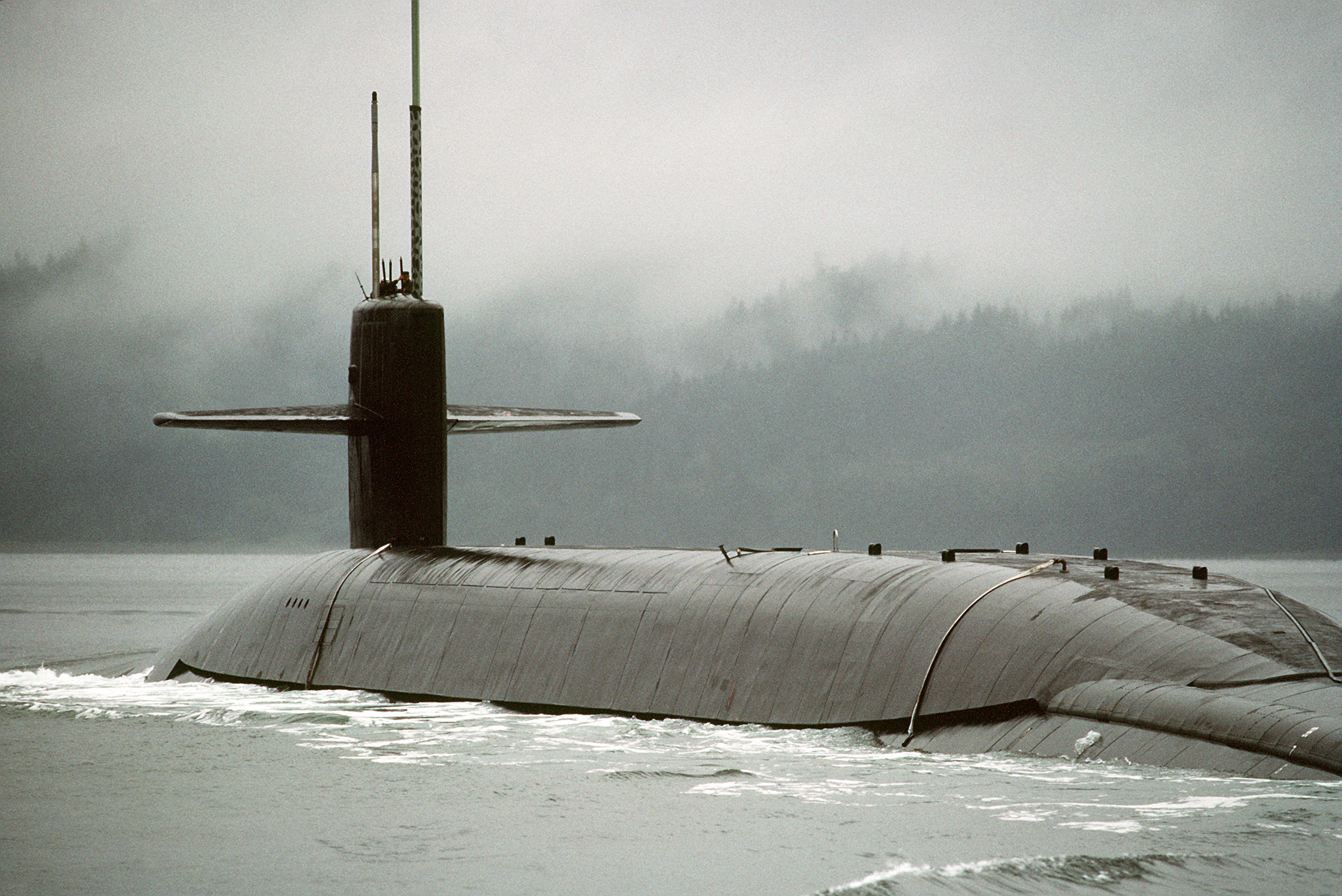
USS Ohio

- The largest submarine ever built up to that time, the 560 foot long USS Ohio, began its first sea trials, departing from the shipyards of Groton, Connecticut shortly before 5:00 am. Built at a cost of $1.2 billion, and capable of carrying 24 of the Trident missiles, which could each deliver five nuclear warheads, the sub was immediately shadowed by the Soviet surveillance ship Ekvator, which had anchored outside of U.S. territorial waters, 12 nautical miles off of the coast of Long Island.
- Pink Floyd performed at Earls Court with David Gilmour, Nick Mason, Roger Waters & Richard Wright and would not perform again as a quartet until July 2, 2005, over 24 years later.
- Born: Amrita Rao, Indian film actress, in Mumbai
- Died:
  - Yitzhak Zuckerman, 66, Polish leader of the Warsaw Ghetto Uprising who helped thousands of his fellow Jews escape the Nazi invasion, and continued to search for the Nazis after emigrating to Israel
  - Sir Richard O'Connor, 91, British general who led the fight against Italy in North Africa during World War II
  - Zerna Sharp, 91, American educator, who, beginning in 1924, created the "Dick and Jane" primers used for four decades in American schools.

== June 18, 1981 (Thursday) ==
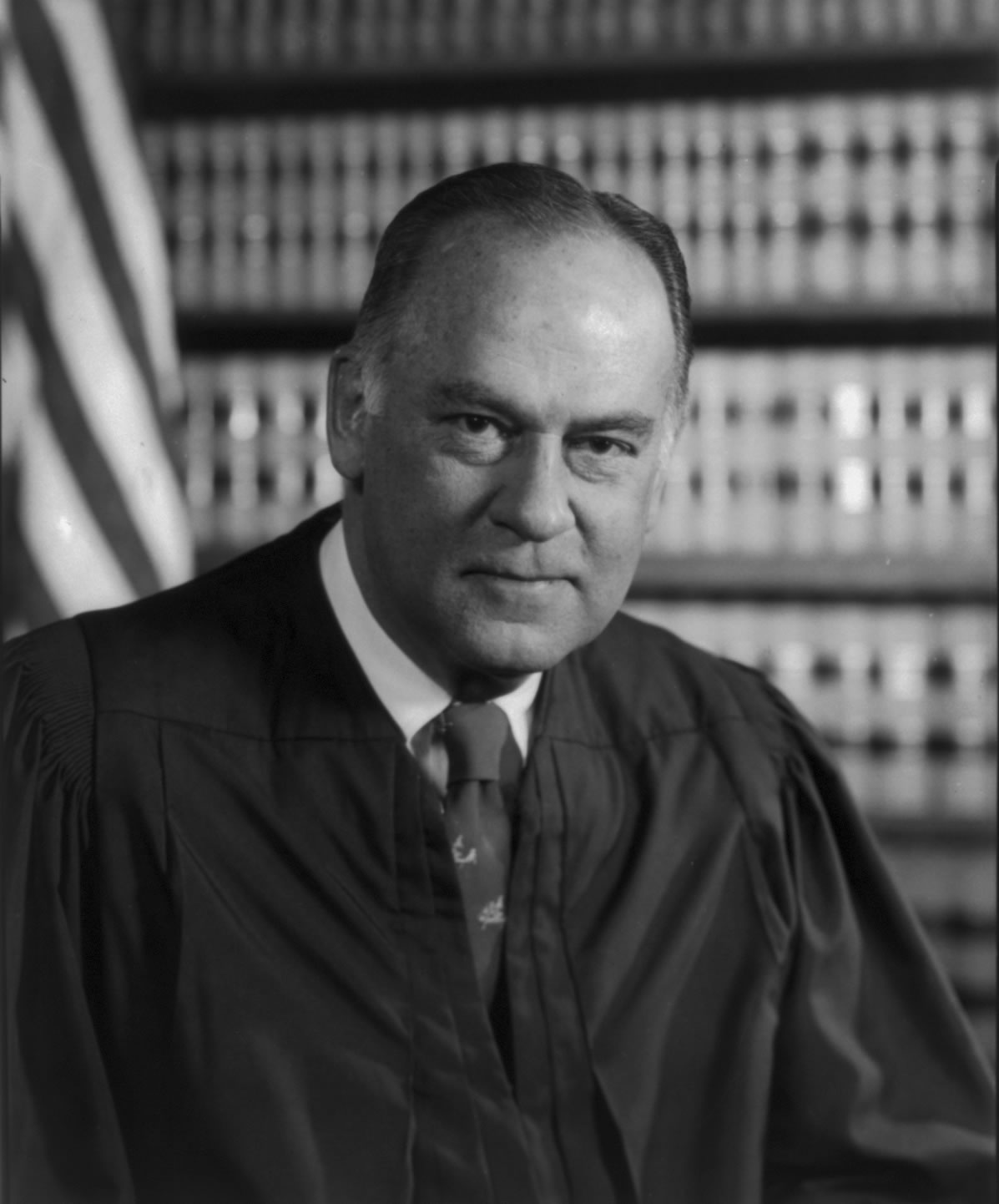
Justice Stewart

- Potter Stewart retired from the United States Supreme Court after a service that began in 1958, clearing the way for the appointment of the first woman to serve on "the highest court in the land". Stewart explained the next day that he had quit after receiving a letter in 1980 from Donna Gallus, a senior at Technical High School in St. Cloud, Minnesota. As part of a social studies assignment to write to a national figure, Gallus had asked why Stewart was still on the Court after 22 years, and that the letter, said Stewart, "sort of started me thinking".
- The F-117A Nighthawk "Stealth" fighter made its first flight, with Lockheed test pilot Hal Farley at the controls.
- The Organization of Eastern Caribbean States (OECS) was created by the signing of the Treaty of Basseterre, with Antigua and Barbuda, Dominica, Grenada, Montserrat, St. Christopher and Nevis, St. Lucia and St. Vincent and the Grenadines
- The first genetically-engineered vaccine, created by Genentech to protect livestock against hoof-and-mouth disease, was announced by U.S. Secretrary of Agriculture John Block in a visit to Sacramento.
- Open Doors smuggled one million contraband Chinese Bibles in one night to a beach near the city of Shantou in southern China on a mission they named Project Pearl.
- Born: Ella Chen (Chen Chia-Hwa), Taiwanese singer with S.H.E; in Pingtung
- Died: Pamela Hansford Johnson, 79, English poet, novelist, playwright, literary and social critic

== June 19, 1981 (Friday) ==
- Celine Dion made her debut at age 13, on a local Montreal talk show, the Michel Jasmin Show, in conjunction with her first single, Ce n'était qu'un rêve (literally, "It Was Just a Dream")
- In what was described as "a make-or-break proposition" for the European Space Agency and its efforts to have its own space program, the third launch of an Ariane rocket was successful (the 1979 mission reached orbit, but a 1980 launch failed). Lifting off from French Guiana, the 155 foot tall rocket carried into orbit the Meteostat 2 weather satellite, and India's first geostationary satellite, the APPLE (Ariane Passenger Payload Experiment).
- Superman II premiered in the United States, more than 7 months after its world premiere in Australia on December 4, 1980. Prior to its American debut, it had been seen in seven European nations, as well as Argentina and Japan.
- Born: Pervin Chakar (Pervîn Çakar), Kurdish operatic soprano, in Mardin, Turkey
- Died:
  - Henri Busignies, 76, electronics inventor who had 140 patents for aerial navigation
  - Lotte Reiniger, 82, German-born silhouette animator
  - Juan Jose Crespo, Basque nationalist, in the 66th day of his hunger strike at Carabanchel Prison

== June 20, 1981 (Saturday) ==
- In Tehran, demonstrations by the People's Mujahedin of Iran (PMOI) against the dismissal of Iran's President Banisadr became violent, and a wave of arrests and executions of PMOI members followed. According to some accounts, the Ayatollah Khomeini ordered the Islamic Revolutionary Guards to fire into the crowd and more than 100 demonstrators were killed. In another account, the PMOI battled with the Guards, with 15 dead on each side. In the first three weeks after the demonstration, 195 of Banisadr's supporters had been tried and executed. By year's end, the government had announced a total of 1,656 executions before a firing squad.
- Boxer Alexis Arguello, who had previously been featherweight world champion (1974–77) and junior lightweight champion (1978–80) became lightweight world champion, beating Jim Watt in a 15-round bout in London.
- Born Alisan Porter, American film actress (Curly Sue), in Worcester, Massachusetts

== June 21, 1981 (Sunday) ==
- France's Socialist Party won control of the 491 member Assemblée nationale in an election, more than doubling its number of seats from 117 to 285 for a majority. After 23 years in power, the coalition of Conservative parties dropped its share from 274 to 147. Pierre Mauroy, who had formed an interim government while elections were being held, was appointed Prime Minister of France by President François Mitterrand.
- In the deadliest accident to ever happen at Washington State's Mount Rainier National Park, 10 mountain climbers and their guide were killed when tons of ice fell without warning, sweeping them into a 100 foot deep crevasse, and burying them under 70 feet of ice. That afternoon, in the worst accident to ever happen at Oregon's Mount Hood, five mountain climbers were killed when a group of 16, linked by ropes for safety during their descent, fell 2,500 feet down the side of the mountain.
- The South African police claimed to have arrested eight leaders of the South African Youth Revolutionary Council.
- Born: Simon Delestre, French equestrian ranked thirty-sixth on the FEI Rolex Ranking List, in Metz.

== June 22, 1981 (Monday) ==
- On the opening day of the Wimbledon tennis tournament, American John McEnroe, ranked #2 in the world, stunned the crowd with an unprecedented display of temper. Beginning with the 12th game his first-round match against Tom Gullikson, McEnroe began berating the umpire, Edward James, when calls went against him. In the 9th game of the second set, McEnroe shouted to James "You can't be serious! You are an incompetent fool, an offense against the world!" McEnroe's antics continued all the way to his victory in the championship match.
- One day after Iran's Parliament, the Majlis, voted 177–1 in favor of a resolution finding President Abolhassan Banisadr incompetent to hold office, the Ayatollah Khomeini, de facto leader of Iran, dismissed him. "I did not want today to happen," Khomeini wrote in a published declaration addressed to Banisadr, "but you did not listen to my advice. You did not stop your interest in these corrupt and criminal groups and they drew you to your destruction..." The President was replaced by a triumvirate consisting of Ayatollahs Mohammed Beheshti and Hashemi Rafsanjani, and Prime Minister Mohammed Ali Rajai.

== June 23, 1981 (Tuesday) ==
- The Pawtucket Red Sox beat the Rochester Red Wings, 3–2, in the 33rd inning of a game that had started 67 days earlier. The game had been halted in the early morning of April 19, tied 2-2 after 32 innings and more than 8 hours of game time. The game ended 18 minutes after it resumed, with Dave Koza's single bringing in Cliff Speck for the game winner. Future MLB stars Cal Ripken and Wade Boggs participated for Rochester and Pawtucket, respectively.
- The first execution under the new criminal procedure law of the People's Republic of China took place at Nanjing. On June 10, rules were changed to allow death sentences to be approved by intermediate People's Courts, previously reserved to the nation's Supreme Court. A murderer named Luo, whose arrest, trial, conviction and appeal took place over an 8-day period, was publicly executed at a rally attended by 10,000 people.
- Died: Zarah Leander, 74, Swedish-born actress in German film, described as "the greatest screen idol of the Third Reich"

== June 24, 1981 (Wednesday) ==
- The phenomenon of Our Lady of Međugorje was first reported when six young people in Yugoslavia claimed to have seen an apparition of The Virgin Mary. Ivanka Ivankovic, who allegedly saw it first, was joined by her sister Vicka Ivankovic, Mirjana and Ivan Dragicevic, Marija Pavlovic and Jakov Colo. Although the local Catholic bishop, Pavo Zanic, felt that the apparitions had been "a case of collective hallucination", Pope John Paul II approved pilgrimages to the area in 1986, and tens of thousands of believers have visited Međugorje (now part of Bosnia and Herzegovina) since then.
- Soldiers in the army of Uganda killed 86 people, mostly women and children, in a massacre at the city of Arua.
- Died: Paul Butler, 89, multimillionaire who founded Butler Aviation Company and who was largely responsible for the creation of Oak Brook, Illinois. Butler, whose net worth was estimated at between 50 and 125 million dollars, was struck by a car while standing in the street in front of his home to take photographs.

== June 25, 1981 (Thursday) ==
- In a double-bout in Houston, WBC welterweight champion Sugar Ray Leonard made a technical knockout (TKO) of Ayub Kalule in the 9th round to win the WBA's junior middleweight boxing championship, and Thomas Hearns defended his title against challenger Pablo Baez. The double bill set up a September 16 bout between Leonard and Hearns
- In a 6–3 decision in the case of Rostker v. Goldberg, the U.S. Supreme Court ruled that women were exempt from draft registration
- Born: Simon Ammann, Swiss ski jumper, in Grabs, four-time Olympic gold medalist (2002 and 2010)

== June 26, 1981 (Friday) ==
- Hua Guofeng formally resigned as Chairman of the Chinese Communist Party, the position that he had held since the death of Mao Zedong in 1976.
- The film Stripes, starring Bill Murray and Harold Ramis, premiered in the United States, before being shown worldwide.

== June 27, 1981 (Saturday) ==
- The first game of paintball was played after two friends— writer Charles Gaines and stockbroker Hayes Noel— decided that a competitive sport could be made from using a "marker gun", designed originally at the request of the U.S. Forestry Service as a way to mark trees (for later removal) from a distance. Near Sutton, New Hampshire, Gaines and Noel organized two teams, each with six players armed with a Nel-spot 007 marker firing paintballs at each other.
- In a major break from the cult of personality that had been inspired by the late Chairman Mao Zedong, "Resolution on Certain Historical Issues of the Party Since the Founding of the PRC" was approved by the Central Committee of the Chinese Communist Party. A 119-page document faulted Mao for the Cultural Revolution that lasted from May 1966 until Mao's death in October 1976, described as "responsible for the most severe setback and heaviest losses suffered by the party, the state and the people", but added that "an error comprehensive in magnitude and protracted in duration... was the error of a great proletarian revolutionary."
- The Banjul Charter, or the African Charter on Human and Peoples' Rights, was adopted by the 51 members of the Organisation of African Unity (OAU) at its meeting in the capital of The Gambia, to take effect October 21, 1986

== June 28, 1981 (Sunday) ==
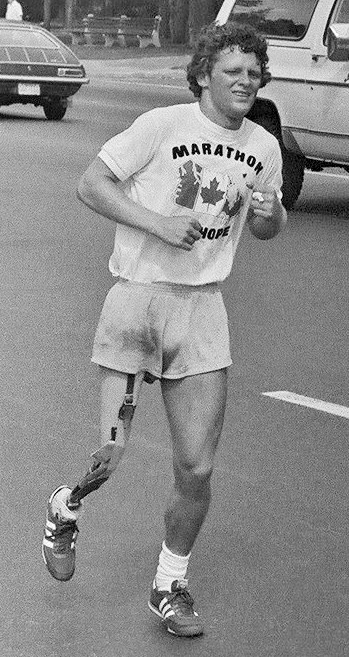
Terry Fox

- The Tehran headquarters of the Iran's Islamic Republican Party was destroyed at 9:05 pm by a powerful bomb that killed 74 government leaders during a meeting. The Ayatollah Mohammad Beheshti, Secretary-General of the party, Chief Justice, and second-in-command to the Ayatollah Khomeini, was speaking at the meeting when the bomb, hidden in a trash basket near the podium, exploded. The roof of the two story IRP hall collapsed, killing nearly all of the 90 people inside at the time. In addition to Beheshti, four cabinet ministers, six deputy ministers, and 27 members of parliament were killed.
- Giovanni Spadolini became the 65th Prime Minister of Italy. As leader of the Italian Republican Party (PRI), he was the first premier since 1945 to be from a party other than the Christian Democrats.
- Fifty members of the Lighthouse Gospel Tract Foundation in Arizona waited in vain for the Rapture, after predicting June 28, 1981 for the date of the return of Jesus. On July 10, the group's leader revised the new date to August 7, 1981.
- Born: Mara Santangelo, Italian tennis player, in Latina
- Died: Terry Fox, 22, Canadian athlete and cancer activist.

== June 29, 1981 (Monday) ==
- Hu Yaobang was elected as Chairman of the Chinese Communist Party, to succeed Hua Guofeng. After the position of Chairman was abolished the following year, Hu continued as General Secretary, until he was dismissed on January 16, 1987, and replaced by Zhao Ziyang.

== June 30, 1981 (Tuesday) ==
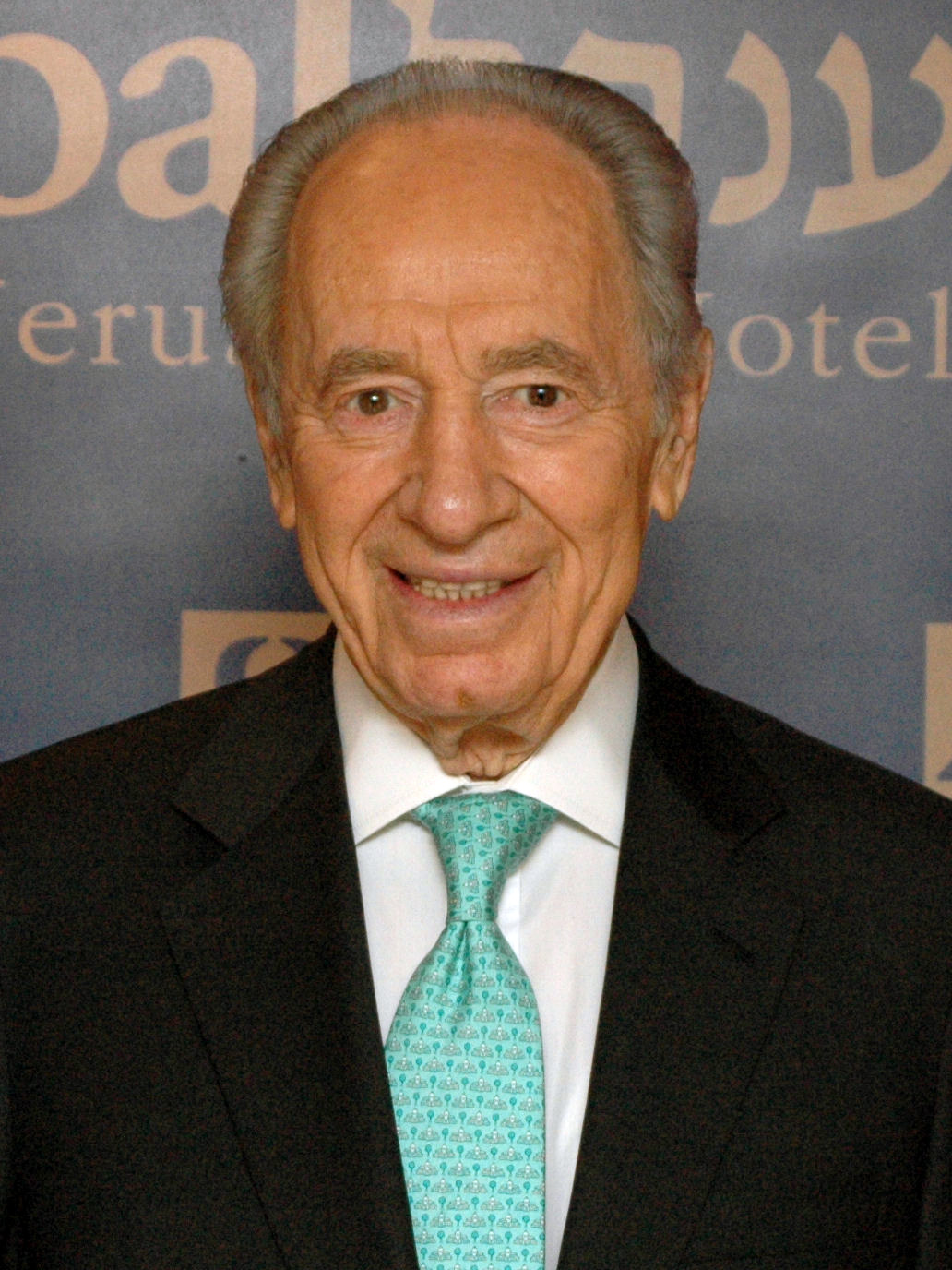
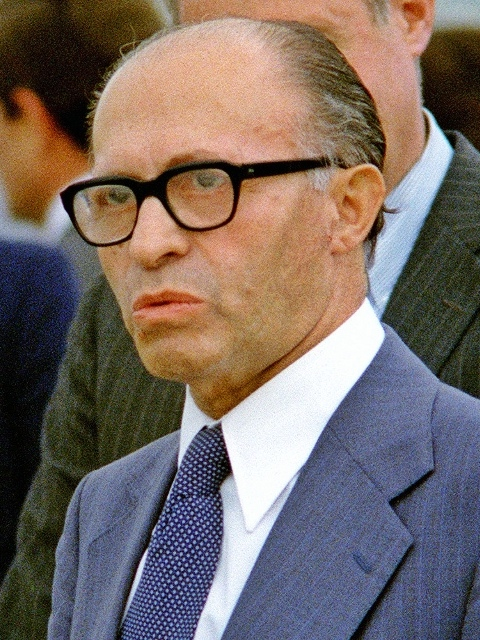
Challenger Shimon Peres and Israel's Prime Minister Menahem Begin
- In the closest election in Israel's history, Menachem Begin's Likud Party won 48 seats, and the Labor Party led by Shimon Peres had 47, with neither holding a majority in the 120 seat Knesset. Likud eventually negotiated a coalition with the National Religious Party (6), Agudat Israel (4) and TAMI (3) to reach 61 seats.
- Eight former guards of the Majdanek concentration camp were convicted of war crimes by a West German court, bringing to an end a trial that had begun on November 24, 1974.
