= South African Youth Revolutionary Council =

South African political organisation

The South African Youth Revolutionary Council (SAYRCO) was a South African political organisation. SAYRCO profiled itself as (for lack of a better term) a 'third force' in the anti-Apartheid struggle. It was associated with the Black Consciousness Movement.

== Foundation and exile ==
The group emerged from the non-ANC, non-PAC sector of the Soweto Student Representative Council (SSRC). The group was forced into exile after the 1976 Soweto uprising. They first arrived in Botswana, and later relocated to Nigeria. The group conducted fundraising tours in the United States, Western Europe and West Africa. In July 1979 the presidency of the group was passed from Tsietsi Mashinini to Khotso Seatlhoho. In this process the name SAYRC was adopted. As of 1981 SAYRCO obtained funding from the Nigerian government. Seatlhoho received military training from the Palestine Liberation Organization in Syria and Lebanon. SAYRCO called for more offensive forms of armed struggle against the Apartheid regime, criticizing the established anti-Apartheid movements of being too defensive.

== Armed struggle ==
The liberation of Zimbabwe open the possibilities for SAYRCO to launch its armed struggle inside South Africa. The ZANU-PF offered military training to SAYRCO cadres. The organisation attempted to enter South Africa and build an armed force there.

== Capture of Seatlhoho ==
On 18 June 1981 South African authorities arrested Seatlhoho and another SAYRCO member, Masabatha Loate. Seatlhoho was caught whilst in a meeting in Orlando East. They would be sentenced to ten and five years of imprisonment respectively. Seatlhoho's captured was heavily publicized by the regime, the news was carried in many newspapers. The Daily Telegraph ran a headline saying "The Scarlet Pimpernel of Soweto arrested!". On 21 June 1981 the South African police claimed to have arrested a total of 8 SAYRCO leaders.

Seatlhoho was jailed on Robben Island. After Seatlhoho's arrest the organisation appeared to have become defunct. The Nigerian government withdrew its support to the group, and returned to its former policy of supporting ANC and PAC (which, unlike SAYRCO, enjoyed recognition from the Organization of African Unity).
