= May 1981 =

Month of 1981

<<	May 1981					>>
Su	Mo	Tu	We	Th	Fr	Sa
					1	2
3	4	5	6	7	8	9
10	11	12	13	14	15	16
17	18	19	20	21	22	23
24	25	26	27	28	29	30
31

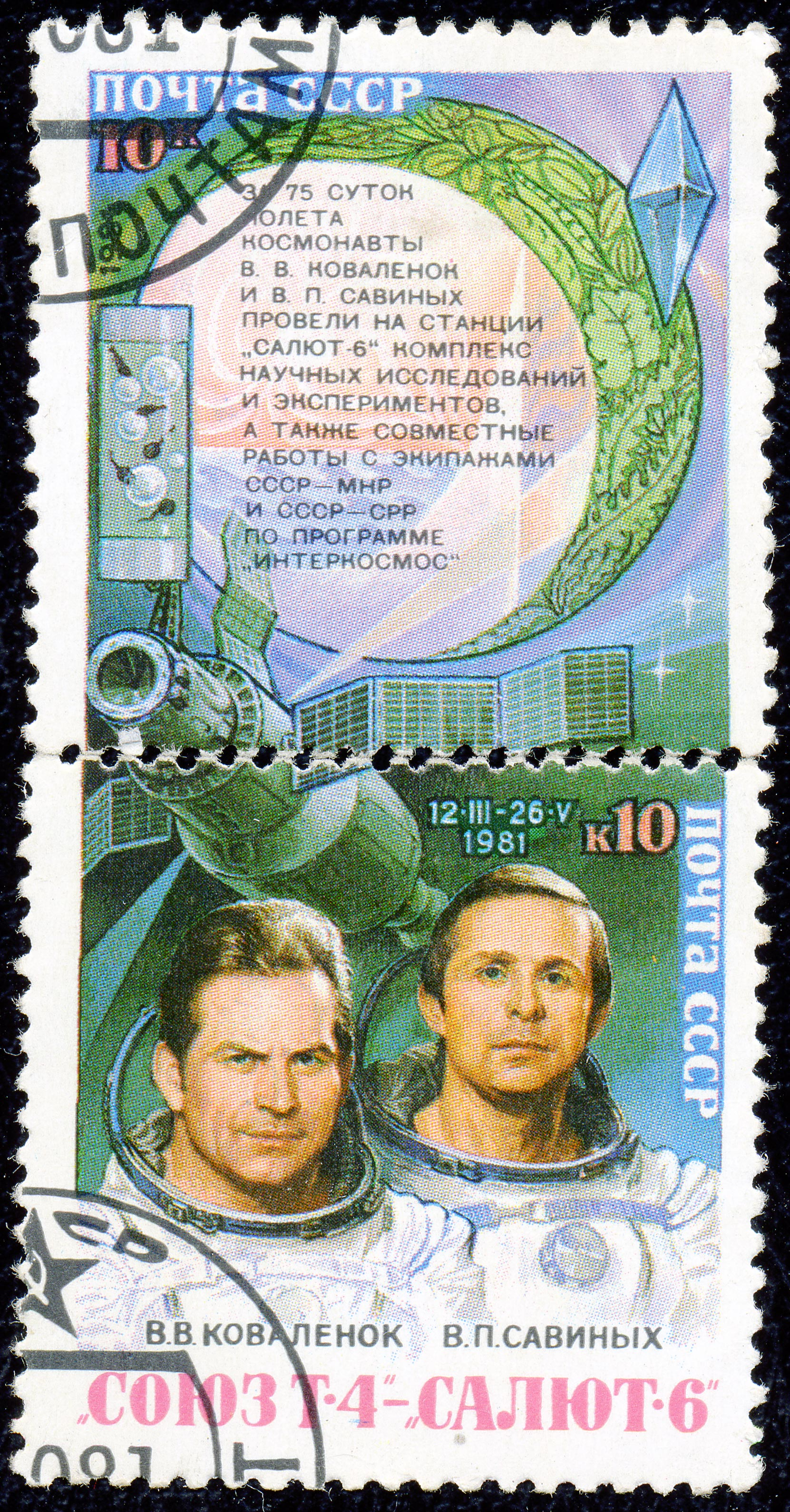
May 26, 1981: Kovalyonok and Savinykh, back after record 75 days in orbit

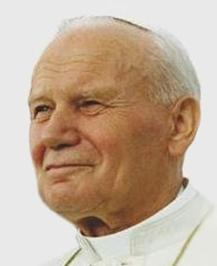
May 13, 1981: Pope John Paul II survives wounding in assassination attempt

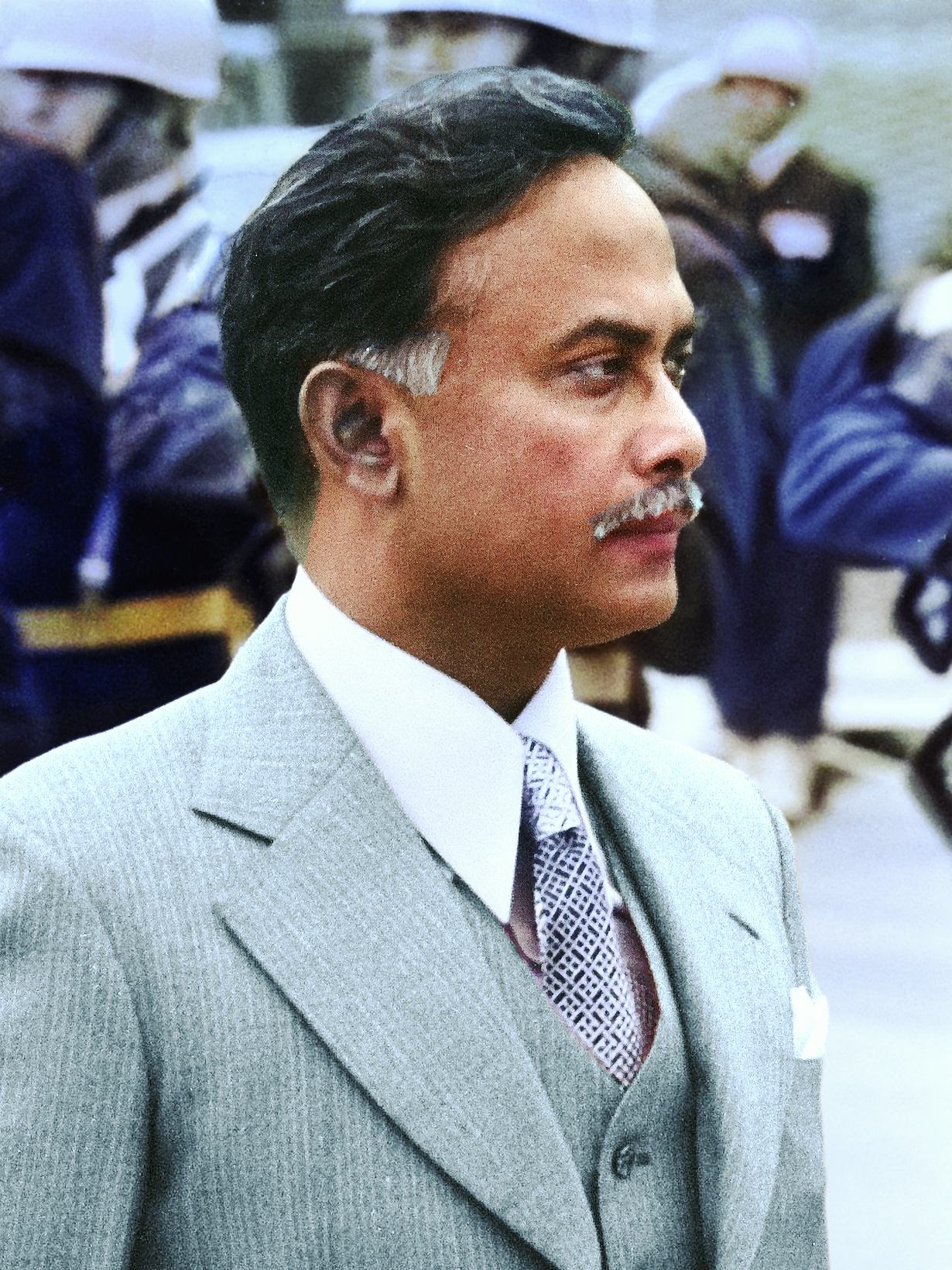
May 30, 1981: President Rahman of Bangladesh assassinated

The following events occurred in May 1981:

== May 1, 1981 (Friday) ==
- The first frequent-flyer program was introduced, with American Airlines launching "AAdvantage." People flying on "AA" were rewarded with credits that could be amassed and used for free travel. Soon, other airlines would follow suit.
- An 8-year-old boy in Spain became the first victim of toxic oil syndrome, dying from acute respiratory insufficiency after eating food prepared in a cooking oil that contained aniline. Before the source was located, 20,643 cases would be documented and 312 other people would die of aniline poisoning within the first year.
- U.S. Senator Harrison Williams of New Jersey was convicted on felony charges of bribery and conspiracy, and sentenced to 3 years in prison. Senator Williams refused to resign until his conviction was upheld on appeal, and would not quit until March 11, 1982.
- In response to pressure from the United States, Japan's Ministry of International Trade and Industry (MITI) enacted a voluntary restraint agreement (VRA), reducing the number of car sales to the U.S. to 1,680,000 units. The VRA would stay in effect until March 1, 1985.
- Born: Alexander Hleb, Belarusian footballer with 80 caps for the Belarus national football team; in Minsk, Byelorussian SSR, Soviet Union

== May 2, 1981 (Saturday) ==
- Aer Lingus Flight 164 from Dublin to London was hijacked by Laurence James Downey, whose motive was to learn the 3rd of the Three Secrets of Fátima. After dowsing himself with gasoline and threatening to set himself afire, Downey ordered the Boeing 737 to fly to the French city of Le Touquet and held the 113 people on board hostage, demanding publication of his manifesto, and for Pope John Paul II to disclose the third secret. French anti-terrorist police rushed aboard the airliner after 8 hours and took Downey into custody, without the secret being revealed. Downey would live to see the Vatican's release of the secret on June 26, 2000.

== May 3, 1981 (Sunday) ==
- Symeon of Thessaloniki was proclaimed a saint of the Greek Orthodox Church by unanimous decision of church officials.

== May 4, 1981 (Monday) ==
- The U.S. Federal Communications Commission announced that it had set aside the 40 MHz range of the radio spectrum for future use by cellular telephone systems, with each market to receive two equal blocks, one of which would be granted to the local telephone service provider, and the other to the highest bidder. The number of available channels for communication had been 44 since 1946, and was increased to 666 by the ruling.
- Born: Jacques Rudolph, South African cricketer in 48 test matches and 45 one-day internationals for the South Africa national team; in Springs, Transvaal Province
- Died: Paul Green, 87, American playwright known for The Lost Colony and In Abraham's Bosom

== May 5, 1981 (Tuesday) ==
- While in orbit in the Salyut 6 space station, Soviet cosmonaut Vladimir Kovalyonok saw what he described as an unidentified flying object that resembled a transparent barbell, kept the same speed as the station, and then exploded. Kovalyonok would describe the experience 12 years later in an interview.
- Born: Craig David, English R&B singer with 14 Brit Awards from the British Phonographic Industry; in Southampton, Hampshire
- Died:
  - Bobby Sands, inmate at the Maze Prison, convicted activist of the Provisional Irish Republican Army, and a Member of Parliament, died on the 66th day of his hunger strike, at the age of 27. Sands had gone into a coma and succumbed at 1:17 am local time. British policy toward hunger strikers had been changed in 1974 to prohibit forced feeding or other medical intervention.
  - Alphonse Indelicato, 50; Dominick Trinchera, 44; and Philip Giaccone, 48, three high ranking bosses in the Bonanno crime family, were shot to death after being invited to a meeting at the 20/20 Nightclub in Brooklyn by Joseph Massino of the Rastelli family. Massino's men then disposed of the bodies.

== May 6, 1981 (Wednesday) ==
- Citing Libya's support of international terrorism, the United States ordered the closure of the Libyan Embassy building in Washington, D.C. Ambassador Ali Houderi was summoned to the U.S. State Department, and told to withdraw the 27 diplomats and their families within one week. The U.S. Embassy in Libya had closed in 1980. Diplomatic relations were restored in 2004.
- Maurice Papon, the Minister of the Budget of France, was revealed by the newspaper Le Canard enchaîné to have been a collaborationist with the Nazi German occupation forces in Vichy France during World War II. Documents discovered by Le Canard showed Papon's signature on orders deporting French Jews to Germany. Papon would later be tried for and convicted of crimes against humanity.
- The Vietnam Veterans Memorial Fund announced that it had accepted the design of 21-year-old architecture student Maya Ying Lin for the memorial in Washington D.C. Lin's proposal was #1026 out of 1,421 reviewed by a panel of judges.
- A U.S. Air Force C-135 plane, similar to a Boeing 707, exploded at 10:45 while at an altitude of 28,000 feet. All 21 USAF personnel on board were killed, and the wreckage was scattered over an area near Frederick, Maryland.
- Died: Frank Fitzsimmons, 72, President of the International Brotherhood of Teamsters since 1967, died of lung cancer. Roy Williams succeeded him on May 15.

== May 7, 1981 (Thursday) ==
- Stand-up comedian Jerry Seinfeld, of Massapequa, New York, performed for a national audience for the first time, introduced by Johnny Carson on The Tonight Show. His routine, taped in the evening, aired an hour into that night's show. Seinfeld's national television debut had been in 1980 on three shows of the TV comedy Benson.
- A school bus accident in Surakarta, Indonesia, killed 31 people, mostly children, when the driver ignored a signal at a railroad crossing.

== May 8, 1981 (Friday) ==
- A sinkhole in Winter Park, Florida began forming near South Denning Drive and West Fairbanks Avenue at 8 p.m. By Saturday, it had "swallowed" the home of 67-year-old beautician Mae Rose Owens, along with six cars at German Car Service, a Porsche dealership, and part of the municipal swimming pool before stabilizing.
- Maureen Mosie, believed to be the last victim of the "Trans-Canada Highway Killer", was found beaten to death at Kamloops in British Columbia. Beginning on October 19, 1973, and continuing for more than seven years, 28 young women and girls, in British Columbia and Alberta, most of them hitchhikers, were raped and murdered. The crimes remain unsolved.
- Died: Uri Zvi Grinberg, 84, Israeli poet and journalist who wrote in Yiddish and in Hebrew

== May 9, 1981 (Saturday) ==
- Direct elections were held in Nepal for the first time for the Rashtriya Panchayat.
- India's Prime Minister, Indira Gandhi overwhelmingly won a vote of confidence, 275–90, following a ten-hour debate that had started the afternoon before.
- Died: Nelson Algren, 72, American novelist known for The Man with the Golden Arm

== May 10, 1981 (Sunday) ==
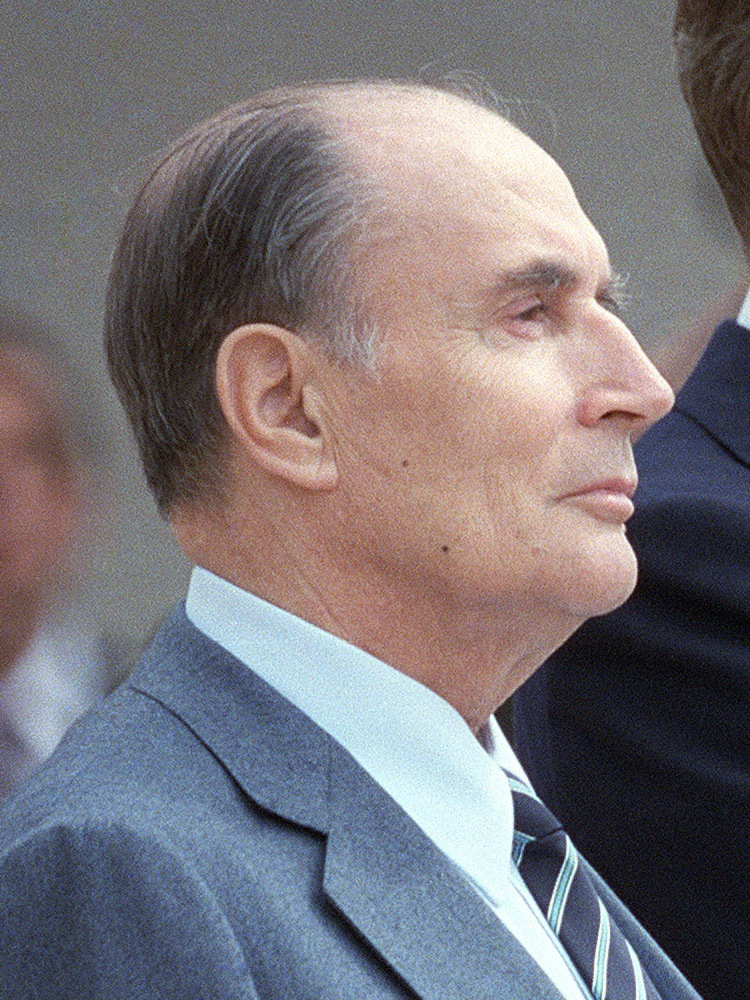
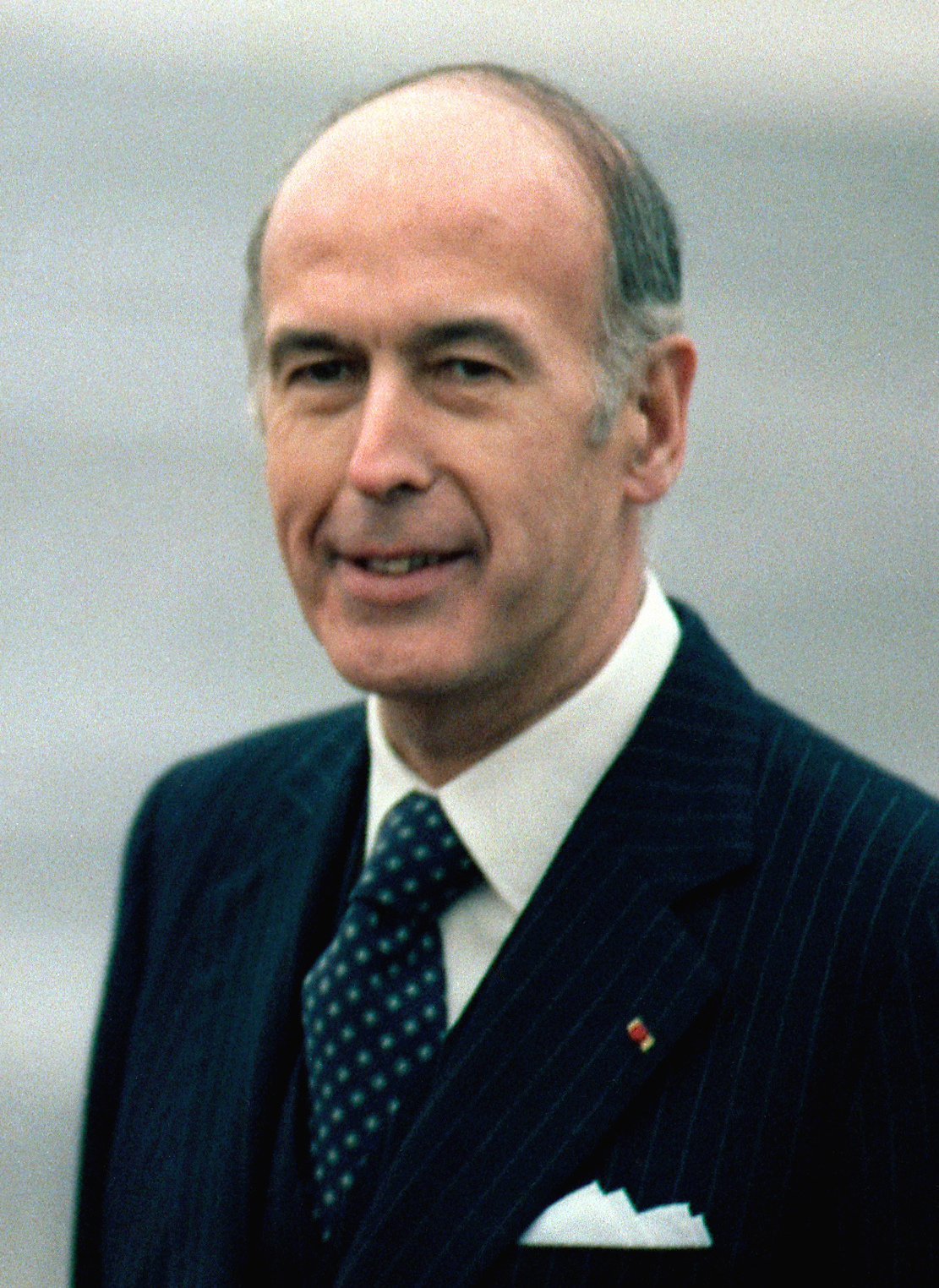
François Mitterrand vs. Valéry Giscard d'Estaing
- In the second round of the presidential elections in France, François Mitterrand beat President Valéry Giscard d'Estaing, receiving 15,708,262 votes to Giscard's 14,642,306. Mitterrand had been defeated for the presidency in 1965 and in 1974 before winning a seven-year term as the first socialist President of the French Fifth Republic.
- Joseph Christopher, an American serial killer who killed twelve people was arrested, and charged with the murders of four soldiers earlier in the year. He had been hospitalized on May 6 after a suicide attempt; the "Midtown Slasher", bragged to a nurse about his crimes.

== May 11, 1981 (Monday) ==
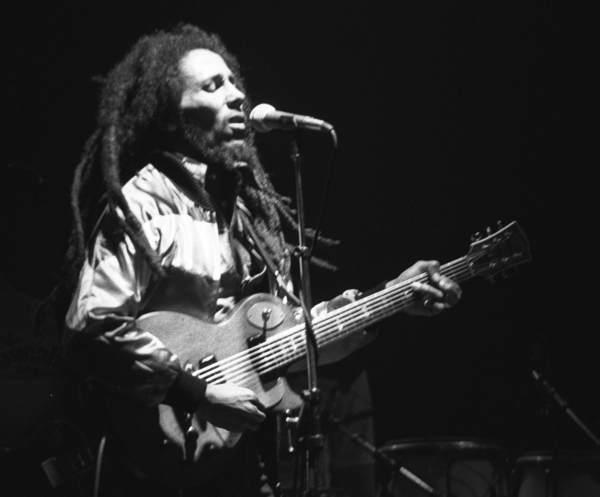
Bob Marley

- Andrew Lloyd Webber's hit musical Cats was performed for the first time, beginning an 8,949 show run at the New London Theatre, closing on May 11, 2002. The Broadway production would open at the Winter Garden Theatre on September 23, 1982.
- Born:
  - Lauren Jackson, Australian-born pro basketball player, MVP of the WNBA in 2003, 2007 and 2010, and of Australia's WNBL in 1999, 2000, and 2004; in Albury, New South Wales
  - Daisuke Matsui, Japanese footballer with 32 caps for the Japan national team; in Kyoto
- Died: Bob Marley, 36, Jamaican reggae singer and musician, died of skin cancer that metastasized to his lungs and his brain.

== May 12, 1981 (Tuesday) ==
- U.S. Secretary of Health and Human Services Richard Schweiker announced the Reagan administration's plan to balance the budget by reducing social security benefits paid for early retirement from 80% of the full rate to 55%. The proposal was so unpopular that both Republicans and Democrats agreed on it, voting 96–0 on a resolution to condemn the idea.
- Dzung Ngoc Tu, a 25-year-old student at Cornell University, was disappeared from Warren Hall, becoming the first of eight murdered by serial killer Michael Bruce Ross from 1981 to 1984.
- Born: Rami Malek, American film and TV actor, 2019 winner of the Academy Award, BAFTA Award and Golden Globe for portraying Freddie Mercury in Bohemian Rhapsody, 2016 Emmy Award winner for Mr. Robot; in Torrance, California
- Died:
  - Benjamin H. Sheares, 73, President of Singapore since 1971
  - Francis Hughes, 25, Irish hunger striker at Maze Prison

== May 13, 1981 (Wednesday) ==
- Pope John Paul II was shot and seriously wounded by Mehmet Ali Ağca, a Turkish gunman, as he entered St. Peter's Square in Vatican City to address a general audience. At 5:17 pm local time (11:17 am EST), the Pontiff was wounded by Agca, who fired from a distance of 15 feet. Bystanders Ann Odre of the United States, and Rose Hill of Jamaica, were also injured.
- Born: Andrey Polukeyev, Russian sprinter; in Sosnovsky District, Chelyabinsk Oblast, Russian SFSR, Soviet Union

== May 14, 1981 (Thursday) ==
- Fifty-three people were killed and 233 others injured in the collision between an express train and the rear of another passenger train, near Kyongsan in South Korea. The first train had backed up 300 yards after striking a stalled motorcycle, and the second was unable to stop in time after rounding a blind curve.
- The Boston Celtics defeated the Houston Rockets, 102–91, to win the National Basketball Association championship, 4 games to 2.

== May 15, 1981 (Friday) ==
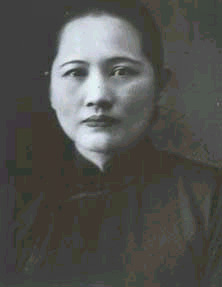
China's Honorary President Soong

- Dying of leukemia, Soong Ching-ling, 90, was named as the ceremonial head of state of the People's Republic of China. The widow of Sun Yat-sen, she was the first person to hold the office since Liu Shaoqi (Liu Shao-chi) was deposed as president in 1967. She died two weeks later.
- Len Barker pitched the first perfect game in Major League Baseball since 1968, in the Cleveland Indians' 3–0 victory over the Toronto Blue Jays. A crowd of only 7,290 saw the game in Cleveland. Barker's catcher, Ron Hassey, would also play in the next perfect game, pitched on July 28, 1991, by Dennis Martínez in the Expos' 2–0 win over the Dodgers.
- Born:
  - Patrice Evra, Senegalese-born French footballer with 81 appearances for the France national team; in Dakar
  - Justin Morneau, Canadian-born MLB baseball player, 2006 American League MVP for the Minnesota Twins and 2014 National League batting champion for the Colorado Rockies; in New Westminster, British Columbia
  - Zara Phillips Tindall, British princess, granddaughter of Queen Elizabeth II, and 2006 equestrian sports champion at the Eventing World Championship; in London to Princess Anne and Mark Phillips
- Died: Odd Hassel, 83, Norwegian chemist and 1969 Nobel Prize in Chemistry laureate

== May 16, 1981 (Saturday) ==
- Soyuz 40, carrying the first Romanian cosmonaut, Dumitru Prunariu, and veteran Leonid Popov, docked with the Salyut-6 space station, two days after launching. The pair were greeted by Vladimir Kovalyonok and Viktor Savinykh, who had been in outer space since March 12.

== May 17, 1981 (Sunday) ==
- Sheikh Hasina, the daughter of Bangladesh founder Sheikh Mujibur Rahman returned from India despite strong opposition from the incumbent president Ziaur Rahman after more than five years exile that began after Mujib's assassination. More than one million of her supporters turned out to welcome her return, and she urged the nation to work toward restoring democracy. On May 30, President Ziaur Rahman would be assassinated. As leader of the Awami League, Sheikh Hasina would become Prime Minister of Bangladesh in 2009.
- Died: Jeannette Piccard, 86, former high altitude balloonist and, in 1974, the first of eleven women ever ordained as priests in the Episcopal Church

== May 18, 1981 (Monday) ==
- The first news article about AIDS appeared on page 7 of the New York Native, a gay bi-weekly newspaper, under the headline "Disease Rumors Largely Unfounded." Larry Mass, a physician and contributor to the Native, had been alerted to an increase in reported cases of pneumocystis pneumonia among gay men, and broke the news two weeks before it was officially announced in the CDC's Morbidity and Mortality Weekly Report.
- Died: William Saroyan, 72, American playwright, screenwriter, novelist and short story writer known for The Human Comedy and The Time of Your Life

== May 20, 1981 (Wednesday) ==
- The first major biotechnology contract was signed, as the Massachusetts General Hospital and the West German pharmaceutical firm Hoechst AG, agreed for the German corporation to pay the hospital $70,000,000 over ten years in return for genetic research.
- Born: Iker Casillas, Spanish footballer and World Cup winning goalkeeper, with 167 caps for the Spain national team; in Móstoles, Madrid Province
- Died: Harry Vaughn, 87 controversial aide to U.S. President Harry Truman

== May 21, 1981 (Thursday) ==
- The World Health Organization approved the International Code of Marketing of Breast-milk Substitutes by a vote of 118 to 1. The lone vote against the code came from the United States.
- François Mitterrand was inaugurated as President of France for the first of two terms of seven years each.
- The New York Islanders won their second consecutive Stanley Cup, beating the Minnesota North Stars 5–1 in Game 5 of the series.
- The mysterious death of a 15-month-old infant became the first sign that ICU Nurse Genene Jones was murdering her young patients.
- Transamerica Corporation was forced to re-sell United Artists to its current owner, Metro-Goldwyn-Mayer for $380 million because of the failure of the 1980 film Heaven's Gate. MGM in turn would create two divisions from the merger, MGM/UA Communications Co. and MGM/UA Entertainment Company.
- Born:
  - Anna Rogowska, Polish pole vaulter and 2009 women's world champion; in Gdynia
  - Josh Hamilton, American MLB baseball outfielder, 2010 American League MVP and 2008 American League RBI leader for the Texas Rangers; in Raleigh, North Carolina

== May 22, 1981 (Friday) ==
- A break in the investigation of the Atlanta Child Murders came a few hours before the scheduled end of days of unproductive stakeout of bridges over the Chattahoochee River. At 2:52, with a little more than three hours left before the operation of monitoring of bridges was to be halted at 6:00 am, FBI agents and Atlanta police saw a white Chevrolet station wagon at a bridge on the James Jackson Parkway, heard a loud splash, and watched the car drive to the other side of the bridge. Stopping the car, they identified the driver as Wayne Williams. The suspect was allowed to go on, but was kept under surveillance. Two days later, the body of Nathaniel Cater was found in the river. Cater had last been seen with Williams on the night before the incident, and animal hairs on his body were consistent with those belonging to Williams's dog.
- Serial killer Peter Sutcliffe, known as the Yorkshire Ripper, was convicted of 13 counts of murder, and sentenced to life imprisonment, with no parole for at least 30 years.

== May 23, 1981 (Saturday) ==
- The first victim of the Ripper Crew, four men who were part of a satanic cult in Chicago, was abducted in the suburb of Elmhurst, Illinois. Her mutilated body was found ten days later, one breast having been cut off. The pattern would continue over the next 17 months, with at least six other women who were kidnapped and had a breast slashed, only two of whom survived. Robin Gecht, Ed Spreitzer, and brothers Andrew and Thomas Kokoraleis would eventually be convicted of various attacks. Andrew Kokoraleis would be executed on March 16, 1999.
- Born: Dessa (stage name for Margret Wander), American singer for the group Doomtree; in Minneapolis, Minnesota
- Died: George Jessel, 83, American vaudevillian, film actor and producer, radio and TV comedian

== May 24, 1981 (Sunday) ==
- Jaime Roldós Aguilera, the 40-year-old President of Ecuador, was killed in a plane crash, along with his wife, the nation's Defense Minister, and six other people. President Roldós was on the way to the town of Zapotillo for a ceremony when the Avro 748 crashed into the side of a mountain. Vice President Osvaldo Hurtado was sworn in as the 34th President of Ecuador and would serve out the rest of Roldos's five-year term until 1984. In his 2004 book Confessions of an Economic Hit Man, author John Perkins would state his belief that the crash was an assassination carried out after Roldós threatened the oil companies that operated in Ecuador.
- The body of Heather Scaggs, the last victim of "The Trailside Killer", was found in a remote part of the Big Basin State Park in California. Scaggs had last been seen alive on May 2, when she got in a car with her coworker, David Carpenter, and he became the prime suspect. Investigators would link Carpenter's .38 caliber revolver to the murder of Scaggs and to six other hikers who had been murdered over the previous seven months.
- Spanish commandos rescued all 70 hostages taken in the takeover of the Central Bank of Barcelona.

== May 25, 1981 (Monday) ==
- Dressed as Spider-Man, professional acrobat Dan Goodwin climbed up the side of the 1,454 foot high Sears Tower in Chicago, using climbing hooks and ropes, reaching the top after 7 1/2 hours. Police unsuccessfully tried to stop him by lowering a window-washing scaffold, but Goodwin moved sideways with the aid of suction cups along the glass facade. At the 55th floor, Goodwin and the police negotiated a deal, allowing him to climb to the roof of the 110 story tower, and then to be arrested.
- The Gulf Cooperation Council (GCC) was created in Riyadh by Saudi Arabia, the United Arab Emirates, Kuwait, Oman, and Qatar as an economic and military alliance.
- The hijacking of a Turkish Airlines jet, with 90 hostages, on board, ended after passengers attacked the group. The DC-9, with 119 people on board, had landed in Bulgaria at Burgas, after being seized while en route from Istanbul to Ankara.
- Died: Rosa Ponselle, 84, American soprano for the New York Metropolitan Opera

== May 26, 1981 (Tuesday) ==
- The crash of an EA-6B Prowler jet on the USS Nimitz killed 14 sailors, injured 48, and caused $100,000,000 in damage to the nuclear powered aircraft carrier. Autopsies showed later that the pilot had had six times the normal level of the stimulant brompheniramine in his blood, and that several of the deckhands had traces of marijuana. The United States Navy would adopt a zero tolerance policy toward drugs and would become the first branch of the American services to begin regular drug-testing.

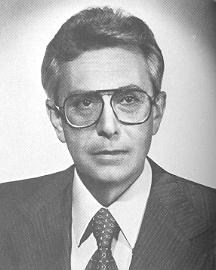
Prime Minister Forlani

- Italy's Prime Minister Arnaldo Forlani and his entire cabinet resigned, days after Forlani had released the list of names of members of the P-2 secret society. Forlani stayed on until a new government could be formed by Giovanni Spadolini.
- Soviet cosmonauts Vladimir Kovalyonok and Viktor Savinykh became the last people to leave the Salyut 6 space station, and return to Earth after a then-record 75 days in outer space.
- Ronald Reagan became the oldest man to serve as President of the United States, reaching the age of 70 years and 109 days. Dwight D. Eisenhower had been 70 years, 108 days old on his last day of office, January 20, 1961.

== May 27, 1981 (Wednesday) ==
- Roger Wheeler, President of Telex Corporation and owner of World Jai Alai, was shot to death by gunmen after finishing a round of golf at the Southern Hills country club in Tulsa, Oklahoma. In 2001, almost 20 years after the crime had been committed, mob hitman John Martorano would plead guilty to Wheeler's murder.
- Julius Erving who led the 76ers to the 1981 Eastern Conference Finals was named the NBA Most Valuable Player for the only time in his stay in the NBA,

== May 28, 1981 (Thursday) ==
- Bambi Bembenek murdered Christine Schultz, her husband's first wife, in Milwaukee. She would be convicted of murder in 1982 and would spend ten years in prison, punctuated by 10 months of freedom in 1990 and 1991 after an escape to Canada from the Taycheedah Correctional Institution. Bembenek's case would inspire two made-for-TV movies and many books.
- Jean Ratelle, who played 13 seasons with the New York Rangers and 7 seasons with the Boston Bruins retired. At the time of his retirement he was the NHL's sixth all time scorer with 1,267 points.
- Born:
  - Adam Green, American anti-folk musician; in Mount Kisco, New York
  - Aaron Schock, American politician who became U.S. Representative for Illinois in 2009 at the age of 27 as the youngest member of the 111th U.S. Congress; in Morris, Minnesota
  - Laura Bailey, American voice actress; in Biloxi, Mississippi
- Died:
  - Mary Lou Williams, 71, American jazz composer
  - Cardinal Stefan Wyszyński, 79, Polish Roman Catholic cleric and Archbishop of Warsaw
  - Lem Billings, 65, long-time confidant of John F. Kennedy

== May 29, 1981 (Friday) ==
- Indonesian author Pramoedya Ananta Toer had two novels banned by the government of Indonesia on grounds that the two books Bumi Mamusia (This Earth of Mankind) and Anak Semua Bangsa (Child of All Nations) were an attempt to spread Communist teachings throughout that nation.
- Born: Andrei Arshavin, Russian footballer, captain of the Russia national football team as midfielder, with 75 caps in international play; in Leningrad
- Died: Soong Ching-ling, 90, widow of Sun Yat-sen and Honorary Chairman of the People's Republic of China, died 13 days after being appointed to the position by the National People's Congress

== May 30, 1981 (Saturday) ==
- Ziaur Rahman, President of Bangladesh, was assassinated as he spent the night in Chittagong. Taking place at 4:00 am local time, the attack was planned by Major General Muhammed Manzur. Lt. Col. Motiur Rahman shot and killed the pajama-clad President Ziaur.

== May 31, 1981 (Sunday) ==
- Buster Douglas, who would become the world heavyweight boxing champion in 1990, began his professional career, knocking out Dan Banks in the third round in a bout in Columbus, Ohio.
- Born: Jake Peavy, American MLB pitcher, 2007 National League Cy Young Award winner, 2004 and 2007 MLB ERA leader while with the San Diego Padres; in Mobile, Alabama
- Died: Giuseppe Pella, 79, Prime Minister of Italy for five months in 1953 and 1954
