= Douglas Crofut =

American radiographer (1942–1981)

Douglas Harris Crofut
- Born: November 6, 1942; Okmulgee County, Oklahoma, U.S.
- Died: July 27, 1981 (aged 38); Tulsa, Oklahoma, U.S.
- Cause of death: Injuries caused by unknown gamma radiation exposure
- Burial place: West Lawn Cemetery, Henryetta, Oklahoma, U.S.
- Occupation: Industrial radiographer

Douglas Harris Crofut (November 6, 1942 – July 27, 1981) was an American radiographer who inspected oil and natural gas pipelines. He died in intensive care as a result of radiation burns and radiation poisoning. His death was the first of its kind in the United States since the 1940s, when radiation deaths occurred during the Manhattan Project at Los Alamos, New Mexico. It is the only U.S. death attributable to an unknown source of radiation, and the only known case in the U.S. of a suspected suicide undertaken via radiation exposure.

== Personal life ==
Prior to injury, Douglas Crofut was a 38-year-old unemployed industrial radiographer who specialized in using gamma rays to inspect pipeline welds. He was reported to have last worked with sources of radiation in October 1980, when he was employed with a Houston-based pipeline inspection firm. Some of Crofut's neighbors described him as a "loner".

== Injury ==
On January 22, 1981, Crofut was brought to a hospital in Okmulgee, Oklahoma, by his sister, who noticed that he was suffering from radiation burns and external bleeding from his left arm and torso. Crofut's sister reported that the burns were of such severity that his left nipple had been burnt away. Doctors determined that Crofut had suffered a massive exposure to an unknown source of radiation. In late January, Crofut was transferred to another hospital (St. Francis Hospital in Tulsa) due to his condition as a result of severe radiation burns.

By mid-March of that year, Crofut appeared to show some signs of improvement. His medical status was upgraded to 'fair', and it was reported that skin grafts were being considered. However, doctors were uncertain of his ultimate prognosis. It was believed that the radiation Crofut had received was "probably lethal". His deep burns continued to worsen, requiring intermittent hospitalization over the next six months. Officials reported that Crofut's radiation injuries had "destroyed [Crofut's] bone marrow, burned off his left nipple, and ate deep into his body like a cancer."

== Death ==
Crofut continued to undergo treatment for the burns to his chest and left arm in the months following his initial injury. On June 1, 1981, he was placed into intensive care due to an ongoing infection, which resulted in his death on July 27.

Due to the "extremely rare" circumstances of Crofut's injury, his story was followed by the media, who reported his death to be "agonizing". One doctor stated that his cells "were degenerating before our very eyes". Following his death, Crofut's attorney, Richard Gibbons, described the radiation burns as "grotesque" and "painful", saying "the area that I looked at was the left side of his chest and it was the most of the left side from his belt line up above his breast. The meat was just completely eaten out and gone for a depth of at least 2 inches". Gibbons said the burns kept growing, finally "eating away until it got to a vital organ—probably his heart. The man was in such obvious pain."

Karl Seyfrit, who was director of the US Nuclear Regulatory Commission (NRC) office in Arlington, Virginia, at the time of Crofut's death, stated that he knew of no other deaths directly attributable to a radioactive source, and Crofut was believed to be the first American to die of radiation injuries since the early days of atomic bomb experimentation.

== Investigation ==
Shortly after Crofut first sought medical care, when it was determined he had been exposed to a powerful source of radiation, his injuries were investigated by the NRC. Initially, officials were concerned that other individuals may have been injured by the same source as Crofut. Both his sister and ex-wife were tested, with neither showing signs of radiation poisoning.

NRC tests performed on Crofut indicated he had been exposed to gamma rays, either from iridium-192 or cobalt-60. The estimated dosage was believed to be 356 or 405 rads (3.56 or 4.05 Gy), respectively (at around 400 rads (4 Gy), roughly 50% of people exposed will die). The NRC believed Crofut's injuries were consistent with radiation exposure occurring between December 15, 1980, and January 10, 1981.

One particularly unusual circumstance concerned the difficulty in determining the radioactive source which had caused Crofut's injuries. The NRC discovered that on December 30, 1980, an industrial radiographic device (along with its protective container) had been reported stolen from a locked truck belonging to a pipe-line inspection company. This incident occurred at the residence of a second radiographer, only a half-mile away from Crofut's home in Henryetta, Oklahoma. The stolen source contained a capsule of iridium-192, the type suspected of causing injury to Crofut. The NRC believed the device was an unlikely item to have been intentionally stolen, citing there was no known personal use for such a device, nor was there a market to sell it to without raising suspicions.

Ultimately, the stolen iridium-192 source turned up on the back porch of a third radiographer also living in Crofut's neighborhood. Neither of the two other radiographers was believed to have been involved in the theft or in Crofut's injuries.^{[Note]} Crofut himself denied any knowledge of the stolen radiographic device, and an NRC spokesman stated Crofut had never been employed by the company from whose truck the iridium disappeared and he had not been directly tied to the theft.

No other potential sources of radiation were identified by the NRC, and the source of radiation which injured Crofut still remains unknown. The NRC investigation was eventually closed without drawing any conclusions. An NRC official reportedly described the situation as "weird", and "one with a lot of quirks in it that so far defy explanation."

== Suicide theory ==
Following Crofut's injury and eventual death, a number of NRC investigators and other officials commented to the media that they suspected Crofut may have intentionally self-inflicted his radiation injuries. He had previously been a radiographer, getting fired from the job less than a year before his death, and had working knowledge of how the machines worked and how dangerous they were. Given his background as a radiographer it was suspected he could have somehow gained access to one of the machines used and using his knowledge from when he operated one, removed the iridium capsule from its heavy lead shielding and placed it into his shirt pocket for at least five minutes, receiving what ultimately proved to be a fatal dosage of radiation.

The NRC further suggested the potential for self harm after looking into Crofut's personal and professional background. One past example which was cited occurred on December 13, 1979, when Crofut was fired from Tulsa Gamma Ray Inc. (now TGR Industrial Services) for alcohol intoxication. Crofut was reported to have been found intoxicated, kneeling over a radiation-emitting device and exposing himself to hazardous rays. However, this incident was reported to have left Crofut with no documented injuries. On another occasion, a neighbor claimed that Crofut had been witnessed dousing gasoline over his body with a rag and then making an unsuccessful attempt to ignite himself with a match. Additionally, NRC officials believed Crofut to be an alcoholic who was deeply in debt and had difficulty keeping a job. He was reported to have a record of sixteen arrests between 1974 and 1980, with most being liquor law violations, such as public intoxication.

== Accidental exposure theory ==
Following his death, Richard Gibbons stated that he would consider potentially taking legal action as a result of Crofut's radiation exposure. Gibbons mentioned Crofut's last workplace in New Mexico as a potential source of exposure, as well as the possibility that Crofut could have unknowingly come into contact with the stolen iridum-192 device at some point in Henryetta. It remains unknown if Crofut himself believed that his injuries came as a result of workplace exposure or by some unknown exposure to the stolen iridium-192 source, prior to it being re-located.

== See also ==
- Demon core
- Harry Daghlian
- Louis Slotin
- List of unsolved deaths

== Notes ==
Sources disagree as to whether the stolen iridium-192 source was located prior to Crofut being hospitalized (most giving January 5 as the date it was located) or whether it was located only after Crofut had already been hospitalized (on January 22).
