= Pigasus Award =

Annual award given by James Randi

- Pigasus Award
- Awarded for: Paranormal fraud
- Country: United States
- Presented by: James Randi
- First award: 1982
- Website: http://web.randi.org/

The Pigasus Award is the name of an annual tongue-in-cheek award, which was presented by the late James Randi, a skeptic. The purpose of the award was to expose parapsychological, paranormal, and psychic frauds whom Randi had noted over the previous year. Randi usually made his announcements of the awards from the previous year on April 1 (April Fools' Day).

== History ==
The award was originally called the Uri trophy, after Uri Geller, and was first announced in the appendix of Randi's book Flim-Flam!. The 1982 edition lists the award's "recipients" in 1979, 1980 and 1981.

In Flim-Flam!, Randi states:

The trophy consists of a stainless-steel spoon bent in a pleasing curve (paranormally, of course) and supported by a base of plastic. Please note that the base is flimsy and quite transparent. I am personally responsible for the nomination of the candidates. The sealed envelopes are read by me, while blindfolded, at the official announcement ceremony on April 1. Any baseless claims are rationalized in approved parapsychological fashion, and the results will be published immediately without being checked in any way. Winners are notified telepathically and are allowed to predict their victory in advance.

— (Randi 1982, pp. 327f)

The bent spoon trophy is a reference to Geller's claimed spoon-bending abilities.

The logo of a winged pig was designed for Randi's website by German artist Jutta Degener in 1996. The name "Pigasus" was chosen by Randi from suggestions e-mailed to him. The term is a portmanteau pun combining the word pig with the mythological Pegasus, a reference to the expression "when pigs fly".

Randi did not present any Uri Award for a number of years after its inception in Flim-Flam! In 1997, it was revived and the name was changed to "Pigasus" after the winged pig. Randi announced the recipients through his e-newsletter, SWIFT!, in which he said "The awards are announced via telepathy, the winners are allowed to predict their winning, and the Flying Pig trophies are sent via psychokinesis. We send; if they don't receive, that's probably due to their lack of paranormal talent."

There were no Pigasus Awards for 1997, 1998, 2000, and 2002.

== Categories ==
Flim-Flam! specifies that the winner of the Pigasus Award falls in one of four possible categories:

1. The scientist who said or did the silliest thing relating to parapsychology in the preceding twelve months.
2. The funding organization that supports the most useless parapsychological study during the year.
3. The media outlet that reported as fact the most outrageous paranormal claim.
4. The "psychic" performer who fools the greatest number of people with the least effort in that twelve-month period.

The 2003 Pigasus Awards featured only categories 1 and 4. The 2005 awards added a fifth category "for the most persistent refusal to face reality".

== Recipients ==
=== Category 1 – Scientist ===
- 1979 – William A. Tiller, who said that although the evidence for psychic events was very shaky and originates with persons of doubtful credibility, it should be taken seriously because there is so much of it.
- 1980 – Isaac Bashevis Singer, for declaring a belief in demons.
- 1981 – Charles Tart, for discovering that the further in the future events are, the more difficult it is to predict them.
- 1996 – Scientist/physicist Ed May, who headed the CIA "remote viewing" project.
- 1999 – The Kansas State Board of Education for removing the teaching of evolution from the state's educational agenda.
- 2001 – University of Arizona Psychology professor Gary Schwartz for studies in parapsychology.
- 2003 – South African Minister of Health Manto Tshabala-Msimang for endorsing alternative medicine for treating AIDS.
- 2004 – Rogerio Lobo, professor/chairman of the department of obstetrics and gynecology at Columbia University who co-signed a paper titled Does Prayer Influence the Success of in Vitro Fertilization-Embryo Transfer?
- 2005 – Brenda Dunne, Princeton Engineering Anomalies Research Lab manager, for the doublespeak of promoting studies whose "experimental results display increases in information content that can only be attributed to the influence of the consciousness of the human operator", while simultaneously insisting that PEAR is "not in the business of demonstrating 'paranormal' abilities".
- 2006 – Biologist Rupert Sheldrake for research funded by Trinity College, Cambridge on his theory of "telephone telepathy", supposed precognition experienced by the recipients of telephone calls and e-mails, (i.e. knowing who is calling before picking up the phone or viewing the caller ID.)
- 2007 – Intelligent Design promoter and professor of biochemistry at Lehigh University Michael Behe for his book The Edge of Evolution: The Search for the Limits of Darwinism.
- 2008 – Colin A. Ross, for claiming that he can shoot electromagnetic radiation from his eyes.
- 2009 – Mehmet Oz, for his promotion of energy therapies such as Reiki.
- 2010 – NASA engineer Richard B. Hoover and the Journal of Cosmology; Hoover for claiming unfounded evidence for microscopic life found on meteorites and the Journal of Cosmology for publishing articles advancing the scientifically unsupported idea that life began before the first stars formed and was spread throughout the early universe on meteors.
- 2011 – Daryl Bem, for his shoddy research that has been discredited on many accounts by prominent critics, such as Drs. Richard Wiseman, Steven Novella, and Chris French.
- 2013 – Stanislaw Burzynski, for "[selling] expensive cancer cures by administering ‘antineoplastons’, costing his customers tens of thousands of dollars, and which have never been shown to be efficacious in controlled trials."

=== Category 2 – Funding ===
- 1979 – The McDonnell Foundation, who gave $500,000 to Washington University in St. Louis to study spoon-bending children. (See Project Alpha)
- 1980 – The Millennium Foundation for giving $1 million to parapsychological research. (The award was withdrawn in 1982 when the foundation decided, instead, to invest the million dollars in a "psychically discovered" oil site, which turned out to be dry.)
- 1981 – The Pentagon for spending $6 million to determine whether or not burning a photograph of a Soviet missile would destroy the missile. (Randi 1982, pp. 327–329)
- 1996 – Robert Bigelow for funding John E. Mack and Budd Hopkins, and for purchasing the so-called Skinwalker Ranch in Utah known for alleged UFO attacks, "interdimensional portals", and cattle mutilations.
- 1999 – The Human Resources Administration of the City of New York, for training welfare recipients to work as telephone psychics.
- 2001 – The University of Paris for awarding a doctorate in Sociology to Élizabeth Teissier for a 900-page thesis on the validity of astrology.
- 2004 – The United States Air Force Research Laboratory, who paid $25,000 to Eric W. Davis at a Las Vegas company called Warp Drive Metrics to study the "conveyance of persons by psychic means" and "transport through extra space dimensions or parallel universes."
- 2005 – City Council of Auckland, New Zealand, for a NZ$2,500 (US$1,800) grant to the Foundation For Spiritualist Mediums "to teach people to communicate with the dead".
- 2006 – Templeton Foundation for spending US$2.4 million and ten years research on a study researching the effectiveness of prayer.
- 2007 – The White House, described by Randi as "faith-based".
- 2008 – Logan Craft, Walt Ruloff, and John Sullivan, producers of Expelled: No Intelligence Allowed.
- 2009 – Iraq's Interior Ministry, for spending tens of millions on bomb-detecting dowsing rods, the ADE 651.
- 2010 – CVS/pharmacy, for their supporting of homeopathic medication.
- 2011 – Syracuse University, for their continuing promotion and support of facilitated communication.
- 2012 – Pumpkin Hollow Retreat Center, for their funding and promotion of the spurious "contemporary healing modality which evolved from the process of laying-on of hands" called Therapeutic Touch.

=== Category 3 – Media ===
- 1979 – Prentice Hall and American International Pictures, for The Amityville Horror, labeled as "A True story".
- 1980 – The reality television series That's Incredible!, for declaring a simple magic trick to be genuine. (The performer, James Hydrick, later admitted it to be false.)
- 1981 – TV station KNBC of Los Angeles, for accepting the Tamara Rand hoax as real without checking into it.
- 1996 – Awarded collectively to a number of media outlets for perpetuating the Roswell UFO incident.
- 1999 – Television host Bill Maher for endorsing a series of psychics.
- 2004 – The film What the Bleep Do We Know!?.
- 2005 – ABC's Primetime Live for its credulous "John of God" special, about Brazilian "psychic surgeon" João Teixeira
- 2006 & 2007 – Daytime talk show host Montel Williams for promotion of Sylvia Browne.
- 2008 – Late-night cable television, for carrying advertisements for pseudoscientific products and services, in particular, Enzyte.
- 2009 – The Oprah Winfrey Show
- 2010 – Mehmet Oz for his promotion of quack medical practices.
- 2011 – TLC, for airing a collection of shows that promote belief in the paranormal.
- 2012 – Syfy, for promoting paranormal fringe-belief through various shows on its network.

=== Category 4 – Performer ===
- 1979 – Philip Jordan, who was hired by Tioga County, New York, Public Defender R. L. Miller to assist in choosing jurors by their "auras".
- 1980 – Dorothy Allison, a psychic housewife who was called upon to solve a series of murders in Atlanta, Georgia. She failed to do anything but give the police 42 different names for the murderer.
- 1981 – Tamara Rand, professional psychic, who claimed she had predicted an assassination attempt on Ronald Reagan months before the incident when she actually did it a day after the event.
- 1996 – Sheldan Nidle, who predicted the end of the world on December 17, 1996, then explained that it came, but we were all unaware of it.
- 1999 – Nostradamus
- 2001 – John Edward
- 2003 and 2004 – Sylvia Browne
- 2005 – Allison DuBois, inspiration of NBC TV show Medium.
- 2006 – Uri Geller
- 2007 – Swiss performer Vincent Raven for his tricks on The Next Uri Geller program.
- 2008 – Jenny McCarthy, for being a spokesperson for the anti-vaccination movement.
- 2009 – Chip Coffey, for his television show Psychic Kids.
- 2010 – Televangelist Peter Popoff, for offering "supernatural debt relief".
- 2011 – Theresa Caputo, for "engaging in utter nonsense".
- 2012 – Alex Jones, for his continued promotion of medical quackery and unfounded conspiracy theories on his radio show.

=== Category 5 – Refusal to face reality ===
- 2005 – Journal of Reproductive Medicine, for refusal to denounce the now-discredited Cha/Wirth paper, Does Prayer Influence the Success of in Vitro Fertilization-Embryo Transfer, that JRM published. (Paper co-signer Rogerio Lobo won the 2004 Pigasus Scientist award.)
- 2008 – Kevin Trudeau
- 2009 – Scientologists
- 2010 – Andrew Wakefield, the researcher who launched the modern anti-vaccine panic with unfounded statements linking the MMR vaccine with autism that were not borne out by any research.
- 2011 – James Van Praagh, who pushes theories about ghosts despite being debunked by Randi several times.
- 2012 – Mehmet Oz, for his continued promotion of quack medical practices, paranormal belief, and pseudoscience.

== See also ==
- Bent Spoon Award "presented to the perpetrator of the most preposterous piece of paranormal or pseudoscientific piffle"
- List of mocking awards
