= Dorothy Allison (psychic) =

American psychic

- Born: December 29 1924; Jersey City, New Jersey, United States
- Died: December 1 1999 (aged 74); Belleville, New Jersey, United States
- Occupation: Self proclaimed Psychic Detective
- Known for: Work on the Atlanta murders of 1979-1981, Appearances on TV series Unsolved Mysteries and Secrets of the Unknown

Dorothy Allison (December 29, 1924 – December 1, 1999) was a self-proclaimed psychic detective from New Jersey.

== Biography ==
She was born and raised in Jersey City, New Jersey.

Allison was credited by some sources with assisting a number of police investigations over the years, including the 1967–1968 search for a missing boy (later found drowned) in Nutley, New Jersey, the 1974 kidnapping of Patty Hearst, and the 1976 Son of Sam murders. In October 1980, she went to Atlanta to assist police investigating the then-ongoing series of murdered children, but police said she ultimately did no more than give them 42 possible names for the murderer, none of which proved helpful.

Many others considered her a fraud. Two police detectives in Paterson, New Jersey, accused her of offering them money to say that she had been helpful in the 1979 search for a missing boy, later found murdered (Allison denied the charge). She was a frequent target of scientific skeptic James Randi, who cited her failure in the Atlanta case when naming her for one of his earliest "Uri Awards" (later called the Pigasus Awards) in April 1981.

Allison published a book about her activities, called A Psychic Story, in 1980. In May 1988, she was featured on the television series Unsolved Mysteries and, later that year, Secrets of the Unknown. Dorothy was also featured on Psychic Investigators, Season 3, Episode 3, What Lies Below.

A resident of Nutley, she died of heart failure on December 1, 1999, at Clara Maass Medical Center in Belleville, New Jersey.
