= February 1981 =

Month of 1981

<<	February 1981					>>
Su	Mo	Tu	We	Th	Fr	Sa
1	2	3	4	5	6	7
8	9	10	11	12	13	14
15	16	17	18	19	20	21
22	23	24	25	26	27	28

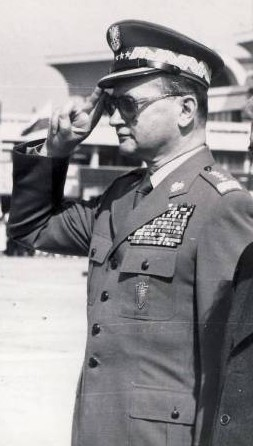
February 9, 1981: General Jaruzelski takes over in Poland

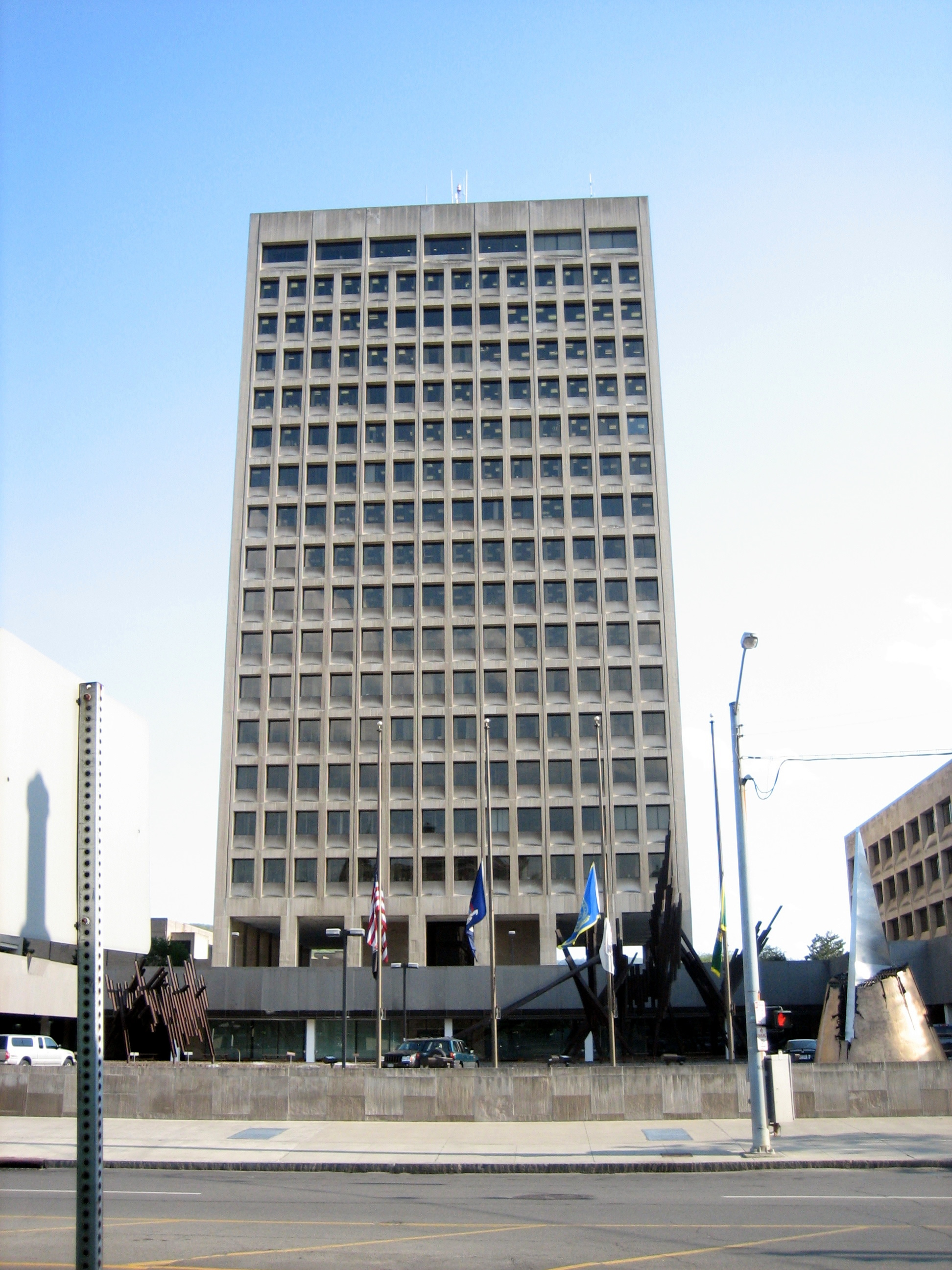
February 5, 1981: Toxic waste renders government building uninhabitable for 13 years

The following events occurred in February 1981:

== February 1, 1981 (Sunday) ==
- In the third match of the best 3-of-5 final of cricket's World Series Cup between Australia and New Zealand at Melbourne, Australian bowler Trevor Chappell and his brother, team captain Greg Chappell, became infamous for the way that the match was won. On instructions from Greg, Trevor forwent an overarm throw and rolled the ball along the ground to New Zealand's final batter, Brian McKechnie, to preserve Australia's 235–229 victory. The rules were changed afterward to ban the practice.
- The National Football League season extended to February for the first time as the NFC all-stars beat the AFC 21–7 in the Pro Bowl at Honolulu. The Super Bowl has been played in February every year since 2002.
- Died: Donald W. Douglas, 88, American aviation pioneer, founder of Douglas Aircraft, later McDonnell Douglas

== February 2, 1981 (Monday) ==
- For the first time in PGA Tour history, there was a five-way tie at the end of the scheduled rounds of golf, with Hale Irwin, Ben Crenshaw, Bobby Clampett, John Cook, and Barney Thompson all taking 209 strokes on 54 holes at the Bing Crosby National Pro-Am. Cook beat Irwin on the third extra hole and won the $40,500 prize, more than his entire earnings the year before.

== February 3, 1981 (Tuesday) ==
- Dr. Gro Harlem Brundtland was named as the first female Prime Minister of Norway after the ruling Norwegian Labour Party chose her as its new leader to succeed Odvar Nordli, who resigned for health reasons.
- Died: Margaret McNamara, 65, American founder of the Reading is Fundamental (RIF) program

== February 4, 1981 (Wednesday) ==
- An annular solar eclipse was visible in Tasmania (Australia), New Zealand and the South Pacific, and was the 27th eclipse of Solar Saros 140.
- U.S. Congressman Jon Hinson (R-Mississippi) was arrested, along with a 28-year-old male employee of the Library of Congress, at a restroom in a Congressional office building, and charged with homosexual sodomy, a criminal offense under the laws in effect at that time. Hinson resigned his seat a month later.
- The Kishtwar National Park was established in the Jammu and Kashmir State in India. The park covers a total area of 42,500 hectares or about 164 square miles (420 km^{2}).

== February 5, 1981 (Thursday) ==
- A fire broke out at 5:33 a.m. at the State Office Building in Binghamton, New York, and ended up contaminating the entire 18-story building with toxic polychlorinated biphenyl (PCBs), causing what is considered to be the first indoor environmental disaster in the United States. The resulting cleanup job took more than 13 years and cost $53,000,000.
- Died: Ella T. Grasso, 61, Governor of Connecticut 1974–1980, and the first woman to be elected to become a U.S. governor without her husband preceding her.

== February 6, 1981 (Friday) ==
- In Uganda, the National Resistance Army, led by Yoweri Museveni, began a rebellion against the government with an attack on army barracks in Kabamba. The Ugandan Bush War continued for almost five years before Museveni's forces succeeded in toppling the government and Museveni became President of Uganda.
- At a dinner for two at Buckingham Palace, The Prince of Wales proposed marriage to Lady Diana Spencer.
- Died: Frederika, 63, Queen Consort of Greece (the Hellenic kingdom) until the 1964 death of her husband, King Paul

== February 7, 1981 (Saturday) ==
- A fire that killed 70 circus goers, most of them children, broke out during a matinee performance of the Venus Circus in Bangalore, India, with the big top tent burning while 2,000 people attended. Seventy people, mostly children, were killed during the panic.
- A Tupolev Tu-104 carrying 70 (or 52) Soviet military officers from Leningrad to Vladivostok, crashed during takeoff, killing everyone aboard, including 24 admirals and generals. The fatalities, which the Soviet government acknowledged four days later, included Admiral Emil Spiridonov, Commander of the Soviet Pacific Fleet, and Lt. Gen. Georgi Pavlov, Commander of the Pacific Air Wing.

== February 8, 1981 (Sunday) ==
- Twenty-one people were killed and 54 seriously injured at a soccer football match at Piraeus in Greece. Olympiacos had defeated visiting AEK Athens, 6–0, and fans rushing to a blocked stadium exit were trampled. This still stands as the worst tragedy in the history of Greek sport.
- The decapitated body of 29-year-old Leroy Carter, Jr., was found in Golden Gate Park in San Francisco, the apparent victim of a ritual killing. Carter had apparently been sleeping near the park's Alvord Lake when he was attacked. Reportedly, the head had been removed "with precision style" and the mutilated bodies of several chickens were located fifty yards away. Carter's severed head was located near the lake six weeks later, but the murder remains unsolved.

== February 9, 1981 (Monday) ==
- Józef Pińkowski was fired from his job as the Prime Minister of Poland at a session of the United Workers' Party Central Committee, and replaced by the Minister of Defense, General Wojciech Jaruzelski.
- Born:
  - The Rev (James Owen Sullivan), American drummer for metal band Avenged Sevenfold; in Huntington Beach, California (d. 2009).
  - Tom Hiddleston (Thomas William Hiddleston), English actor; in Westminster, London.
- Died: Bill Haley, 55, American rock and roll pioneer, famous for "Rock Around the Clock"

== February 10, 1981 (Tuesday) ==
- Eight people died and 350 were injured at a fire that broke out at 8:00 pm on the 8th floor of the Las Vegas Hilton hotel, and then spread upward to the 22 stories above. Philip Bruce Cline, a 23-year-old busboy who had at first been praised for alerting guests to the blaze, was later convicted of arson and murder, and received eight life sentences in prison.
- Born: Holly Willoughby, English television presenter, in Brighton, East Sussex

== February 11, 1981 (Wednesday) ==
- A misunderstanding at the Sequoyah Nuclear Generating Station Unit #1 near Chattanooga, Tennessee led to a nuclear accident in which 105,000 gallons of radioactive water flooded the containment building and contaminated thirteen Tennessee Valley Authority employees. After being asked to verify that a containment spray valve was properly closed, an auxiliary operator opened the valve instead, diverting the water to a sprinkler system and giving those inside "a chilly but slightly radioactive shower".
- Died: Charles F. Fogarty, 59, Chairman and CEO of Texasgulf. Inc., along with seven others in the crash of a company aircraft. The plane crashed at 6:42 pm as it approached Westchester, Connecticut, on the way back from Toronto.

== February 12, 1981 (Thursday) ==
- The discovery, of a previously unknown symphony by Wolfgang Amadeus Mozart, was announced in Munich by Dr. Robert Münster, a spokesman for the Bavarian State Library. Written 216 years earlier, in 1765, when Mozart was nine years old, Symphony in F major, K. Anh. 223 (19a) was purchased by the library from an unidentified seller who had found it "among some private papers in Bavaria last fall".

== February 13, 1981 (Friday) ==
- Australian press baron Rupert Murdoch purchased the venerable (founded 1785) London newspaper, The Times, and its companion publication, The Sunday Times, after three weeks of negotiation with union leaders. The papers' owner, the Thomson Organization, had announced it would cease publication of both newspapers on Saturday, March 14, if a buyer could not be found.

== February 14, 1981 (Saturday) ==
- In Ireland, a fire killed 48 people and 214 others at the Stardust Cabaret discothèque in Dublin. More than 700 people were present for a Valentine's Day party when flames were observed at 2:00 a.m. Although a 1982 investigation concluded that the fire was intentionally set, a reopened inquiry ruled out arson in 2009, but in 2024 an inquest declared the deaths to be unlawful killings.

== February 15, 1981 (Sunday) ==
- NASCAR driver Richard Petty came from fifth place to win the Daytona 500, after the four drivers ahead of him lost their leads by getting their tires changed. With 26 laps left, Bobby Allison changed the right side tires, and in a process that Petty later described as "follow the leader", Buddy Baker, Dale Earnhardt and Ricky Rudd did the same. Petty and his crew elected to use his final pit stop for fuel only, and "The King" won Daytona for the 7th and last time.
- Born:
  - Olivia Theresa Longott, American R&B singer, in Brooklyn
  - Jenna Morasca, winner of Survivor, in Bridgeville, Pennsylvania
- Died: Michael Bloomfield, 37, electric blues guitarist

== February 16, 1981 (Monday) ==
- Twenty minutes before Pope John Paul II arrived to celebrate mass with 70,000 people at Pakistan's National Stadium in Karachi, a hand grenade exploded in a stairway behind the VIP grandstand, killing the man who had been carrying it. The Pope was on the first stop of a 12-day tour of Asia, after departing Rome earlier that day. After delivering the mass, he flew on to Manila.

== February 17, 1981 (Tuesday) ==
- U.S. President Reagan "dramatically altered the political landscape" by issuing Executive Order 12291. Executive branch agencies could not issue new rules and regulations without first submitting proposals to the Office of Information and Regulatory Affairs (OIRA), along with a cost-benefit analysis that could demonstrate that "the potential benefits to society for regulation outweigh the potential costs".
- Born:
  - Joseph Gordon-Levitt, American actor, in Los Angeles
  - Paris Hilton, American socialite, in New York City;

== February 18, 1981 (Wednesday) ==
- In a 35-minute speech to a joint session of Congress, President of the United States Ronald Reagan outlined the details of a package of reforms that would reduce both inflation and unemployment by reducing federal government spending and cutting the federal income tax rate. The annual inflation rate, 13.58% at the beginning of 1981, had dropped to 6.16% by 1983 and 1.91% by 1987. The unemployment rate, 7.5% when Reagan took office, rose to a high of 10.8% at the end of 1982, falling to 5.3% at the end of Reagan's term.
- Born:
  - Andrei Kirilenko, Russian pro basketball player ("AK47"), in Izhevsk
  - Ivan Sproule, Northern Irish footballer, in Castlederg
- Died: Jack Northrop, 85, founder of Lockheed Corporation and Northrop Corporation

== February 19, 1981 (Thursday) ==
- Entertainer Frank Sinatra was cleared of longstanding rumors that he had ties to organized crime, 18 years after the Nevada Gaming Commission had revoked his license to operate a casino. In 1963, mobster Sam Giancana had visited Sinatra's Cal-Neva Lodge in Lake Tahoe, and the license had been suspended. A factor in the commission's 4–1 vote in favor of Sinatra was a statement of support from U.S. President Ronald Reagan, with an attorney authorized to say that Reagan "considers him an honorable person — completely honest and loyal".

== February 20, 1981 (Friday) ==
- A collision between Aerolíneas Argentinas Flight 342 and the antenna on Tower One of the World Trade Center was averted when an alert air traffic controller, Donald Zimmerman, ordered the pilot to turn right and to climb. With 58 people on board, the Boeing 707 had descended to 1,500 feet (460 m) in a heavy fog. At 10:05 pm, the plane had been 75 seconds away from impact when Zimmerman was able to contact the pilot.
- Died: Nicolas de Gunzburg, 76, French fashion editor for Vogue and Harper's Bazaar

== February 21, 1981 (Saturday) ==
- In a broadcast made from Radio Veritas in Manila, Pope John Paul II made what was described as "the most far-reaching call for interfaith dialogue ever made by a pontiff", proposing to meet with representatives of the world's major religions. "The church of Jesus Christ in this age experiences a profound need to enter into contact and dialogue with all these religions", said the Pope, and that Christians must commit to discussions "so that mutual understanding and collaboration may grow, so that moral values may be strengthened, so that God may be praised in all creation".

== February 22, 1981 (Sunday) ==
- Amateur pilot Charles Newton and his wife Judy were flying in a small engine plane when he suffered a fatal heart attack. Mrs. Newton, who did not know how to fly and was unsure of her location, was saved after a flight instructor in Statesville, North Carolina, Phillip Hazel, took to the air in a plane of his own. After locating her, Hazel then gave Mrs. Newton step-by-step instructions on airplane flight and guided her to a safe landing at the Statesville airport.
- Died: Joe Smith, 97, American comedian who teamed with Charlie Dale (1885–1971) as the comic duo Smith & Dale.

== February 23, 1981 (Monday) ==
- The 23-F coup attempt began at 6:25 pm in Madrid when Spain's Congress of Deputies was taken over by 200 members of the Guardia Civil. A disgruntled Spanish Army officer, Lieutenant Colonel Antonio Tejero Molina led the seizure of the Cortes building and took 347 legislators hostage. The Deputies were voting on whether to approve Leopoldo Calvo Sotelo as the new Prime Minister. The attempted coup failed seven hours later after King Juan Carlos refused to cooperate with the plotters, and then received the support of the rest of the military. The King appeared on television at 1:24 the next morning and announced the end of the crisis. Lt. Col. Tejero, Lt. Gen. Jaime Milans del Bosch, and the King's aide, General Alfonso Armada, were later arrested.
- Died: Shep Fields, 70, American band leader

== February 24, 1981 (Tuesday) ==
- The element bohrium (Bh), with 107 protons, was confirmed for the first time, by a team of scientists in Darmstadt, led by Peter Armbruster and Gottfried Münzenberg. The isotope Bh-262 was the fusion of bismuth-209 and chromium-54.
- For the first time, the seat of a member of the United States Congress was declared vacant by reason of disability. Gladys Noon Spellman, U.S. representative from Maryland, had been comatose since suffering a stroke shortly before her re-election in November. By voice vote, with no objection, the House of Representatives passed a resolution noting that "Mrs. Spellman has been unable to take the oath of office due to a decapacitating illness" and that her position should be declared vacant. Steny Hoyer was elected on May 19 to succeed Spellman, who never recovered but lived until 1988.
- At Buckingham Palace, Britain's Prince Charles and Lady Diana Spencer confirmed that they were engaged and that they would be married in late July.
- The 6.7 M_{s} Gulf of Corinth earthquake affected Central Greece with a maximum Mercalli intensity of VIII (Severe). Twenty-two people were killed, 400 were injured, and damage totaled $812 million.
- Born: Lleyton Hewitt, Australian professional tennis player, ranked #1 in the world by the ATP from 2001 to 2003; in Adelaide

== February 25, 1981 (Wednesday) ==
- A bank robbery was made of a branch of the New York Bank for Savings at Rockefeller Center, by a 9-year-old boy who used a .22 caliber pistol and got away with $118, then surrendered to the FBI two days later. "Robert M." was tried in the state's juvenile court system and found guilty of bank robbery on June 8 and placed on supervised probation in the custody of his family.
- Marking what a music commentator later suggested as the "official date of death" of disco music, the National Academy of Recording Arts and Sciences announced that after two years, there would no longer be a Grammy Award for the genre.

== February 26, 1981 (Thursday) ==
- Joey Coyle, an unemployed longshoreman in Philadelphia, was driving behind an armored car when its doors opened and two bags of money fell out. Coyle retrieved the bags and found that he was in possession of more than $1,200,000 in cash. Over the next six days, he spent or gave away an estimated $196,000 before being caught by the FBI. He was later acquitted of theft, and his story was the basis for the 1993 film Money for Nothing.
- A new record for penalty minutes in a National Hockey League game was set when the Boston Bruins hosted the Minnesota North Stars. The first fight, between Boston's Steve Kasper and the Stars' Greg Smith, broke out seven seconds into the game. Eventually seven Minnesota and five Boston players were ejected, Stars' coach Glen Sonmor fought with a fan, and 406 minutes were assessed. The Bruins won, 5–1. The record would stand for 23 years until broken on March 5, 2004, in the Philadelphia Flyers 5–3 win over the Ottawa Senators, with 419 minutes assessed.
- Died: Don Koehler, American salesman and, at 8 feet and 2 inches (249 centimeters) height, the tallest person in the world. His death left Zeng Jinlian, an 8'1" Chinese girl, as the tallest person in the world.

== February 27, 1981 (Friday) ==
- A daring prison escape was carried out in France when a pair of men forced helicopter pilot Claude Fourcade to fly to Fleury-Mérogis Prison, where armed robbers Gerard Dupre and Daniel Beaumont were incarcerated. At gunpoint, Fourcade landed at a soccer field on prison grounds, took off again with Dupre and Beaumont on board, eluded a chase by police helicopters, and landed at a Paris athletic field where the gang escaped in a waiting car. Dupre was recaptured in Paris on March 6 while Beaumont was arrested in Spain four months later on July 9.
- Born: Josh Groban, American singer, in Los Angeles

== February 28, 1981 (Saturday) ==
- A hunger strike that captured worldwide attention began at the Maze Prison in Northern Ireland. IRA member Bobby Sands ate an orange, and then refused to eat again until the inmates were allowed to wear civilian clothing. Other IRA prisoners joined the hunger strike along the way. Sands would die on May 5, 1981, and nine other inmates would starve themselves to death until the strike's halt in October.
