= William A. Tiller =

Academic

William A. Tiller (Toronto, Canada, September 18, 1929 – Scottsdale, Arizona, February 7, 2022) was a professor of materials science and engineering at Stanford University. He wrote Science and Human Transformation, a book about concepts such as subtle energies beyond the four fundamental forces, which he believes act in concert with human consciousness. Tiller appeared in the 2004 film What the Bleep Do We Know!?.

== Education and career ==
Tiller gained his academic reputation for his scientific work in the field of crystallization. He studied at the University of Toronto and obtained his B.A.Sc. in 1952 with a degree in Engineering Physics from the Faculty of Applied Science and Engineering. He also obtained M.A.Sc. and a Ph.D. degrees from the same university. Altogether, he worked nine years as an advisory physicist with the Westinghouse Research Laboratories and 34 years in academia. From 1964 to 1992 William A. Tiller was a professor in the Department of Materials Science and Engineering at Stanford University, and during this time he held the position of department chairman from 1966 to 1971. In 1970, he was awarded a Guggenheim Fellowship grant in Natural Sciences – Engineering. In 1992 he became professor emeritus. Tiller was a Physics Fellow of the American Association for the Advancement of Science.

=== Pigasus Award ===
In his 1982 book, James Randi identified Tiller as the 1979 "scientist who had said the silliest thing" relating to parapsychology in that year; for this Tiller was awarded the Pigasus Award for 1979.

== Psychoenergetics ==
After his retirement in 1998, he pursued esoteric concepts in psychoenergetics.

== Selected publications ==
He has published several books, over 250 conventional scientific papers and further 100 topics on psychoenergetics.

=== Books ===
- The Science of Crystallization: Macroscopic Phenomena and Defect Generation, Cambridge University Press, 1991, ISBN 978-0-521-38828-3
- The Science of Crystallization: Microscopic Interfacial Phenomena, Cambridge University Press, 1991 (reprinted 1995), ISBN 978-0-521-38827-6
- Psychoenergetic Science: A Second Copernican-Scale Revolution, Pavior Publishers, 2007, ISBN 978-1-4243-3863-4
- Some Science Adventures with Real Magic, Pavior Publishers, 2005, ISBN 1-929331-11-8
- Conscious Acts of Creation: The Emergence of a New Physics, Pavior Publishers, 2001, ISBN 1-929331-05-3
- Science and Human Transformation: Subtle Energies, Intentionality and Consciousness, Pavior Publishers, 1997, ISBN 0-9642637-4-2
- Foreword to Matrix Energetics: The Science and Art of Transformation, Atria Books, 2007, Richard Bartlett, ISBN 978-1-58270-163-9
- Deep Reality: Why Source Science May Be the Key to Understanding Human Potential, Waterside Productions, 2020, Douglas Matzke and William A Tiller, ISBN 9781949001730

=== Selected papers ===
- The effects of emotions on short-term power spectrum analysis of heart rate variability. McCraty R, Atkinson M, Tiller WA, Rein G, Watkins AD. – American Journal of Cardiology, 1996 Feb.
- Pearson, Eric M.; Halicioglu, Timur; Tiller, William A. (1985-11-01). "Laplace-transform technique for deriving thermodynamic equations from the classical microcanonical ensemble". Physical Review A. 32 (5): 3030–3039. Bibcode:1985PhRvA..32.3030P. doi:10.1103/PhysRevA.32.3030. ISSN 0556-2791. PMID 9896445.
- Boyers, David G.; Tiller, William A. (1973-07-01). "Corona discharge photography". Journal of Applied Physics. 44 (7): 3102–3112. Bibcode:1973JAP....44.3102B. doi:10.1063/1.1662715. ISSN 0021-8979.
- What are subtle energies? WA Tiller – Journal of Scientific Exploration, Vol. 7, No. 3, 1993.
- Electronic device-mediated pH changes in water. WE Dibble Jr, WA Tiller – Journal of Scientific Exploration, Vol. 13, No. 2, 1999.
