= March 1981 =

Month of 1981

| << | March 1981 | | | | | >> |
| Su | Mo | Tu | We | Th | Fr | Sa |
| 1 | 2 | 3 | 4 | 5 | 6 | 7 |
| 8 | 9 | 10 | 11 | 12 | 13 | 14 |
| 15 | 16 | 17 | 18 | 19 | 20 | 21 |
| 22 | 23 | 24 | 25 | 26 | 27 | 28 |
| 29 | 30 | 31 |

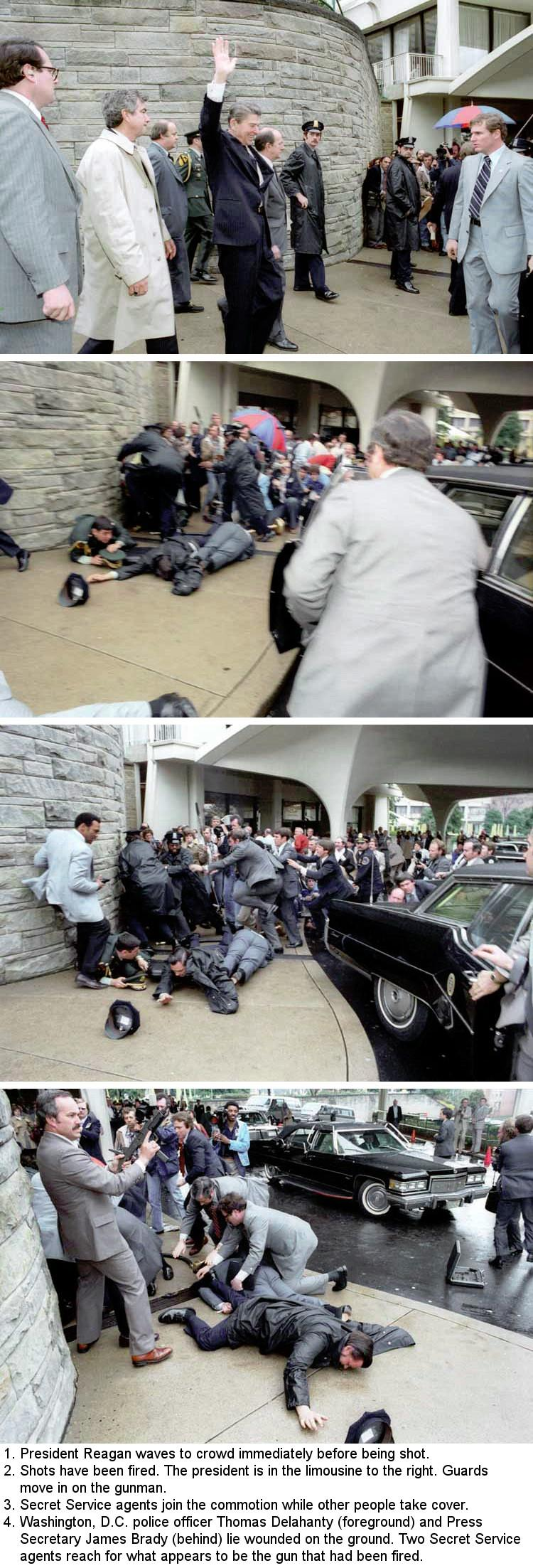
March 30, 1981: U.S. President Reagan shot and wounded by John Hinckley Jr.

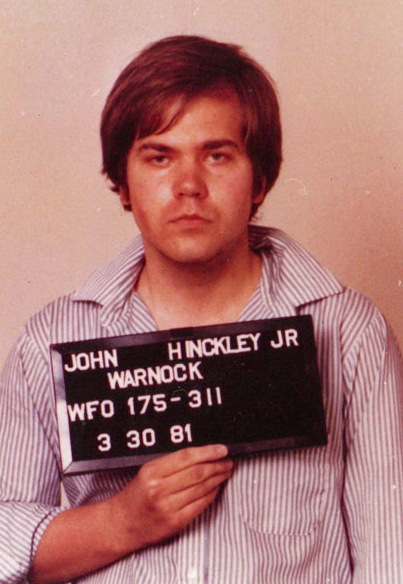
Hinckley

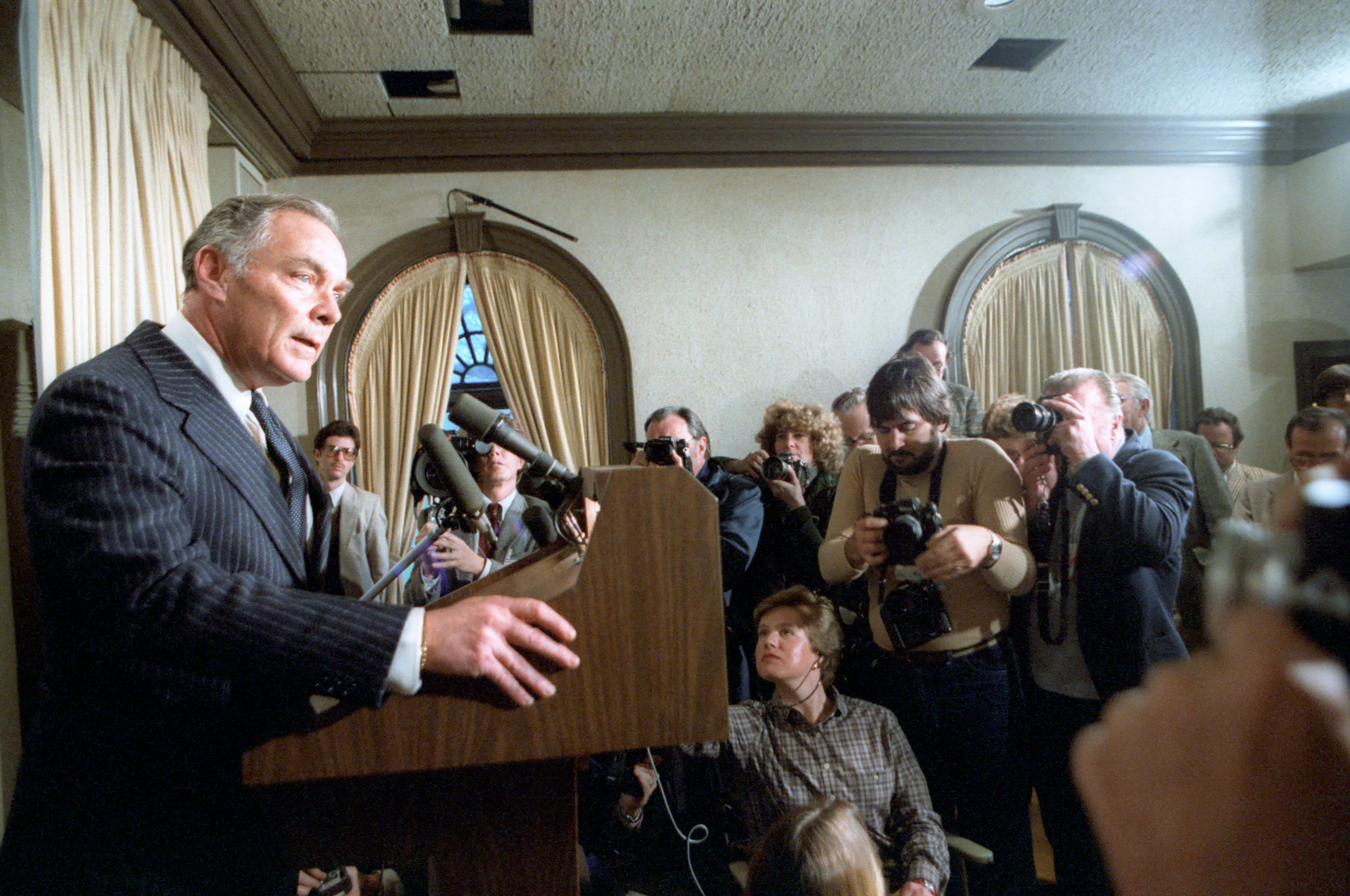
Secretary Haig "in control"

The following events occurred in March 1981: 13

== March 1, 1981 (Sunday) ==
- Bobby Sands, a Provisional Irish Republican Army member incarcerated at the Maze prison, began a hunger strike seeking a change in the treatment of the other IRA member inmates. Sands would die 65 days later, on May 5, and was followed in death by nine other prisoners.
- Robert Goizueta became CEO of Coca-Cola. During his tenure, the Cuban-born businessman tripled the company's sales, and introduced both the successful "Diet Coke" and the disastrous "New Coke"
- Born: Adam LaVorgna, American TV actor (7th Heaven); in New Haven, Connecticut

== March 2, 1981 (Monday) ==
- The asteroids 4923 Clarke and 5020 Asimov were discovered on the same night by astronomer Schelte J. Bus, and named by him in honor of authors Arthur C. Clarke and Isaac Asimov.
- Inventors Jim Bornhorst and Rusty Brutsche applied for a patent on Vari-Lite, a "computer controlled lighting system having automatically variable position, color, intensity and beam divergence", which would become a standard feature in concerts and stage productions. The system, which received U.S. Patent No. 4,392,187, would be unveiled on September 25 during a concert in Barcelona by Genesis in its Abacab tour.
- Pakistani International Airways Flight 326 was hijacked by three gunmen shortly after takeoff from Karachi.
- Valéry Giscard d'Estaing announced that he would run for re-election as President of France.
- Born: Bryce Howard, American film actress (Gwen Stacy in Spider-Man 3); in Los Angeles
- Died: Ahmed Badawi, 54, Egyptian Defense Minister, in a helicopter crash at the Siwa Oasis.

== March 3, 1981 (Tuesday) ==
- At the Hotel Rütli in Zürich, Turkish national Musa Serdar Çelebi offered Mehmet Ali Ağca 1.5 million dollars to kill Pope John Paul II. Ağca carried out the plan, shooting the Pope on May 13.
- At the 26th Congress of the Communist Party of the Soviet Union, all 14 voting members and 8 non-voting members of the Politburo were re-elected to five-year terms, the first time that there had been no change in the Soviet leadership by a party congress. Those re-elected included First Secretary Leonid I. Brezhnev, Yuri Andropov, Konstantin Chernenko and the youngest of the group, Mikhail S. Gorbachev.
- Chun Doo Hwan was inaugurated to his first elected term as President of South Korea. Chun commuted the sentences of 5,221 prisoners, with at least 3,400 released from incarceration.
- Born: Lil' Flip, American rapper, as Wesley Weston Jr.; in Houston
- Died: Rebecca Lancefield, 86, pioneering American microbiologist

== March 4, 1981 (Wednesday) ==
- Six days after he had come into possession of $1.2 million in cash that had fallen from an armored car, Joey Coyle was arrested at JFK International Airport, where he had been preparing to fly to Mexico City. Coyle was acquitted of theft less than a year later. He committed suicide on August 15, 1993, a month before the release of a film based on his story, Money for Nothing
- CBS Sports paid $48,000,000 for the rights to broadcast the NCAA men's basketball tournament for three years, outbidding the NBC network, which had built the popularity of the playoffs since 1969. Bryant Gumbel would later comment, "I thought, How weird. We make the tournament a big deal and basically give it away."
- Died: Yip Harburg, 84, American lyricist (Over the Rainbow), was killed in an auto accident

== March 5, 1981 (Thursday) ==
- Continental Airlines Flight 72 was briefly hijacked by a man who had been fired the day before from his job at the Los Angeles International Airport. Victor Malasauskas brought a 9-mm automatic pistol with him after buying a seat in first-class on the flight bound from LAX to Phoenix. An alert flight attendant saw that he had a concealed weapon, and all but four passengers and two flight attendants were able to get off of the airplane before he realized that he had been spotted. The last of the hostages escaped later in the day. Malasauskas, whose claim that he had a bomb turned out to be false, was later sentenced to 20 years in prison.

== March 6, 1981 (Friday) ==
- After 19 years as the anchorman of the CBS Evening News, Walter Cronkite signed off for the last time. Cronkite had anchored the show since April 16, 1962.
- Born: Ellen Muth, American actress (Dead Like Me); in Milford, Connecticut

== March 7, 1981 (Saturday) ==
- John W. Hinckley Jr. was met at the airport in Denver by his parents, who followed the advice of his psychiatrist and barred him from returning home. The senior Hinckley would later testify, in what he would describe as "the greatest mistake of my life" that he gave his son "a couple of hundred dollars" and told him "O.K., you're on your own. Do whatever you want to." Twenty-three days later, the younger Hinckley carried out an assassination attempt against the President of the United States.
- Eugenia Charles, the Prime Minister of Dominica, announced the arrests of former Prime Minister Patrick John and Defence Force Commander Frederick Newton. Charles said that a coup had been planned for March 14, and she added "I would hope that death would be the penalty, but I can't say that for sure."
- Died:
  - Bosley Crowther, 75, American film critic for the New York Times
  - Hilde Krahwinkel Sperling, 72, American tennis player, French Open champion 1935-37
  - Chet Bitterman, 28, American missionary taken hostage in Colombia
  - Mel C. Yorba, 18, first person to ever be murdered at Disneyland
  - Kiril Kondrashin, 67, Soviet conductor who defected to the Netherlands in 1978

== March 8, 1981 (Sunday) ==
- An accident at the Tsuruga Nuclear Power Plant in Japan led to the spill of thousands of gallons of radioactive wastewater. Fifty-six plant employees were exposed to radiation after being sent to mop up the leak. The incident was not revealed to the public until six weeks later, on April 21.
- In Argentina, an express train, that was bringing 800 passengers back from vacation, crashed into two derailed fuel tanker cars, killing 45 people and injuring 120. The "Firefly" express was returning to Buenos Aires from the seaside resort of Mar del Plata.

== March 9, 1981 (Monday) ==
- The first successful human heart-lung transplant was performed. A team at the Stanford University Medical Center, led by Dr. Bruce Reitz, used a new technique that retained a portion of the recipient's right atrium. The recipient was Mary Gohlke, a 45-year-old woman from Mesa, Arizona, with end-stage primary pulmonary hypertension. The donor was a 15-year-old boy who had died from severe head trauma two days earlier
- Dan Rather began a nearly 24-year tenure as lead anchorman for the CBS Evening News, lasting until he was pressured to retire on March 9, 2005.
- Born: Antonio Bryant, NFL wide receiver; in Miami
- Died:
  - Max Delbrück, 74, German biophysicist, 1969 Nobel Laureate
  - Steven Judy, 24, Indiana murderer, fourth person to be executed in the United States since the death penalty was reinstated in 1977

== March 10, 1981 (Tuesday) ==
- The eleven-year controversy over Roger Coleman began when the body of Wanda Fay McCoy was discovered in her home in Grundy, Virginia. Coleman, her brother-in-law, was convicted of her rape and murder based on blood and hair evidence, as well as testimony from a cellmate, and sentenced to death. Coleman fought for a new trial and maintained his innocence all the way to his execution in the electric chair on May 21, 1992. More than 13 years later, DNA testing confirmed that the pubic hairs found on the victim had indeed been those of Coleman, and that the blood found on his pants had been that of McCoy. "
- U.S. Patent No. 4,255,811 was issued to Dr. Roy L. Adler under the title "Key Control Block Cipher System" for a data encryption algorithm developed by him in 1974 while he was employed at IBM. Besides being applied in cryptography, the 128-bit encoding algorithm was also used in creating more secure keycard entry systems.
- Born: Samuel Eto'o, Cameroonian footballer; in Nkon

== March 11, 1981 (Wednesday) ==
- The start of an uprising, that would lead to the breakup of Yugoslavia and the independence of the Republic of Kosovo, began with student discontent over inefficient food service at the University of Pristina. Tired of being made to wait in line, for hours, for poor quality food, students began demonstrating. Within days, the protests over conditions for students turned into discontent over the treatment of the ethnic Albanian population by the Serbian majority, and then to rioting and demands for an independent Kosovar nation.
- Joseph Sardler, 32, of Mount Airy, North Carolina, had his sight restored after five years of blindness. Sardler had fallen down a flight of stairs and banged his head, then regained the vision in his left eye. His physician, Dr. J. Dale Simmons, reported that Sadler "can read now and recognize things that he could not before."
- Born:
  - LeToya Luckett, American singer and member of Destiny's Child; in Houston
  - David Anders, American TV actor known for Alias; in Grants Pass, Oregon
- Died: Maurice Oldfield, 65, British intelligence expert and Chief of MI-6 from 1973 to 1978

== March 12, 1981 (Thursday) ==
- Women, children and other inhabitants of the El Salvador village of El Junquillo (in the Morazan Department) were murdered on orders of Salvadoran Army Captain Carlos Medina Garay, at the conclusion of a nine-day long military operation against rebellious forces. The details of the massacre were brought out in an investigation more than a decade later by the "Commission on Truth", which had been created as part of a 1992 peace agreement.
- Timothy Hill, 13, disappeared in Atlanta, 10 days after his 15-year-old friend Joseph Bell had vanished, as the two became the latest victims of the murder of children in Atlanta. Hill's body would be found on March 30, and Bell's on April 19. They would prove to be the last of 23 African-American children (16 or younger) to be murdered in Atlanta over a nearly two-year period. Wayne Williams, who was suspected in the killings, was charged with and convicted of the murders of two adult victims.

== March 13, 1981 (Friday) ==
- The first world speedcubing championship tournament, requiring participants to properly align the squares of a Rubik's Cube in the shortest amount of time, took place in Munich. Jury Fröschl won the first competition with a time of 38 seconds.
- The Colombian guerrilla organization M-19 kidnapped Martha Nieves Ochoa Vasquez, the sister of Medellin Cartel druglord Jorge Luis Ochoa. The rival Colombian traffickers formed a temporary alliance, which they called Muerte a Secuestradores, ("Death to Kidnappers") and announced the imminent execution of any guerrilla kidnappers. After being threatened with reprisals, M-19 released Martha Nieves unharmed several months later.

== March 14, 1981 (Saturday) ==
- The hijacking of Pakistan International Airlines Flight 326 ended, as gunmen freed more than 100 hostages who had been held captive on the jet for nearly two weeks. Three gunmen had seized the Boeing 720 jet during a flight from Karachi to Peshawar on March 2 and commandeered the jet to Kabul, and one passenger was murdered. Pakistan released 55 prisoners to secure the release of the hostages.
- DePaul University's basketball team, unbeaten and ranked No. 1 during most of the season, was upset by St. Joseph's University, 49-48, in the second round of the NCAA tournament.
- Nineteen residents of the Royal Beach Hotel in Chicago, a "skid row" apartment for transients, died in fire caused by faulty wiring.

== March 15, 1981 (Sunday) ==
- Philip C. Testa, crime boss of the Philadelphia mob and nicknamed "The Chicken Man", was murdered by a car bomb as he attempted to walk into his home at 2117 Porter Street.
- Francis Hughes became the second inmate at Maze Prison to begin a hunger strike, joining fellow Provisional IRA member Bobby Sands in refusing food. Hughes would also become the second of the strikers to die, succumbing on May 12, one week after the death of Sands.
- Born: Young Buck (stage name for David D. Brown), American rapper; in Nashville
- Died: René Clair, 82, French film director

== March 16, 1981 (Monday) ==
- Ronald Biggs, a participant in the Great Train Robbery of 1963 in Great Britain, had been living freely in Brazil after escaping from prison in 1965. Biggs was kidnapped after being lured to a restaurant in Rio de Janeiro on the pretext that he was to be photographed for a book, then put on a yacht and taken to Barbados. The government of Barbados refused to allow Biggs to be extradited back to the United Kingdom, and Biggs was allowed to return to Brazil after six weeks. Biggs voluntarily returned to Britain at the age of 71 and stayed in prison from 2001 to 2008.
- Born: Curtis Granderson, American baseball player, 2016 Roberto Clemente Award winner; in Blue Island, Illinois

== March 17, 1981 (Tuesday) ==
- In Italy, the scandal of Propaganda Due began when police raided the villa of Licio Gelli villa at Arezzo, and discovered a list of 962 members of the secret society "P2", suspected in the embezzlement by Roberto Calvi of hundreds of millions of dollars from the Banco Ambrosiano.
- Born: Nicky Jam (stage name for Nick Rivera Caminero), Puerto-Rican American singer; in Lawrence, Massachusetts

== March 18, 1981 (Wednesday) ==
- The television show The Greatest American Hero premiered on ABC, starring William Katt as Ralph Hinkley, an ordinary teacher who was given super powers, but not the knowledge of how to control them. Less than two weeks later, after John W. Hinckley Jr. shot U.S. President Ronald Reagan, the character was renamed "Ralph Hanley" for episodes already filmed, and then "Mr. H." for the rest of the season. The show's theme song, Believe It or Not (sung by Joey Scarbury) became a hit single, rising to No. 2 on the Billboard Top 40.
- Born: Fabian Cancellara, Swiss bicyclist and three time world champion on time trial (2006, 2007, 2008 Olympics, 2009); in Wohlen bei Bern

== March 19, 1981 (Thursday) ==
- Two workers died and four were injured after a test of the Space Shuttle Columbia, becoming the first of 16 deaths associated with the American space shuttle program. After a test-firing of the engines and the sounding of the "all clear", the group of six Rockwell International technicians had walked into a chamber of the shuttle, unaware that the area was filled primarily with nitrogen gas, and almost no oxygen. John Bjornstad died immediately, and Forrest Cole was taken off life support on April 1. The Columbia itself would be destroyed on February 1, 2003 on its 28th mission, killing all seven of the astronauts on board.
- Arkansas became the first state to require the teaching of "Creationism", as Governor Frank White signed into law Senate Resolution 590, "An act to require balanced treatment of creation-science and evolution-science in public schools". The act, challenged later in McLean v. Arkansas, had passed the state Senate 22-2 and the state House 69-18.
- Born: Kolo Touré, Ivorian footballer; in Bouake

== March 20, 1981 (Friday) ==
- The first world congress of the International Physicians for the Prevention of Nuclear War convened, in Airlie, Virginia, with 80 physicians from 12 nations in attendance, and on the same day, the first American conference regarding a nuclear freeze campaign convened at Georgetown University. Journalist John Barron alleged later that both events, which came a month after Soviet General Secretary Leonid Brezhnev had called for a moratorium on building nuclear weapons, had been masterminded by the KGB, the Soviet intelligence agency.
- Died:
  - Gerry Bertier, 27, who was later portrayed in the 2000 film Remember the Titans, was killed in an automobile accident
  - Irving Jaffee, 74, American speed skater, gold medalist in 5,000m and 10,000m in 1932 Winter Olympics.

== March 21, 1981 (Saturday) ==
- Michael Donald, a young African-American male who had been selected at random by a pair of racists, was kidnapped and murdered in Mobile, Alabama by James Llewelyn Knowles and Henry F. Hayes, two members of the United Klans of America who said later that they had been outraged when a mistrial had been declared in the trial of a black criminal defendant. Donald's mother sued the Klan organization and won a seven million dollar verdict, effectively bankrupting the white supremacist group.

== March 22, 1981 (Sunday) ==
- Jügderdemidiin Gürragchaa became the first person from Mongolia to travel into outer space, launched on Soyuz 39 along with Vladimir Dzhanibekov. The two cosmonauts returned to earth after almost 8 days on the Salyut 6 space station.
- Born: Shawn Mims, American rapper (This Is Why I'm Hot); in New York City
- Died:
  - Jack McCain, 70, commander of Pacific forces in Vietnam War, and father of U.S. Senator John McCain, died while returning from Europe
  - Jumbo Elliot, 65, American track and field coach

== March 23, 1981 (Monday) ==
- The cost of mailing a letter in the United States went up 20%, as the price of a first-class stamp was increased from 15 cents to 18 cents. The price increase had taken effect the day before, when American post offices were closed.
- Died:
  - Field Marshal Sir Claude Auchinleck, 96, British military leader during World War II
  - Beatrice Tinsley, 40, British astronomer
  - Mike Hailwood, 40, British motorcyclist and ten time world motorcycle racing champion, in an auto accident

== March 24, 1981 (Tuesday) ==
- The Federal Republic of Germany (West Germany) carried out the largest crusade against Nazis since that nation's founding in 1949, raiding hundreds of homes of suspected Neo-Nazi members and confiscating party literature and propaganda, much of it written by Ernst Zündel.

== March 25, 1981 (Wednesday) ==
- Tamil separatist leader Selvarajah Yogachandran, better known by his code name of "Kuttimani", carried out the largest robbery, to that time, in the history of Sri Lanka. In an operation planned jointly by his TELO organization and the Tamil Tigers, Kuttmani and his gunmen ambushed an armored truck that was taking cash from Neervely to Jaffna, killed its guards, and took 7,900,000 Sri Lankan rupees, worth roughly $400,000 at the time, to finance the rebel movement. Kuttmani and his henchmen became the subject of a massive manhunt, and were arrested eleven days later.
- Popular YouTube Vlogger Casey Neistat is born.

== March 26, 1981 (Thursday) ==
- Comedian Carol Burnett won a verdict of 1.6 million dollars against the National Enquirer for libel. In its issue of March 12, 1976, the Enquirer had run a story entitled "Carol Burnett and Henry K. in Row", alleging that Burnett had been disruptive "in a Washington restaurant", and implying that she had been intoxicated.
- The British Social Democratic Party was launched at the Connaught Rooms in London.
- Born: Jay Sean, British rapper; as Kamaljit Singh Jhooti in London

== March 27, 1981 (Friday) ==
- Beginning at 8:00 in the morning, millions of workers in Poland, representing the majority of that nation's labor force, walked off of their jobs for four hours in a demonstration of support for the Solidarity movement. The employees then returned to their posts at noon.
- The United Mine Workers went on strike at 12:01 am, with 160,000 American coal miners walking off of their jobs.
- At 3:10 pm in Cocoa Beach, Florida, eleven construction workers were killed when the five story tall Harbour Cay Condominiums building collapsed. A bucket of wet concrete had slipped from a crane and fallen through the building's roof, and into the floors below.
- Goaltender Ron Loustel played in his sole NHL game, allowing 10 goals against, the most of any goalie who played only 1 NHL game.
- Born: Cacau, Brazilian-German football player; as Claudemir Jerônimo Barreto
- Born: JJ Lin, Taiwan based R&B singer; as Lín Jùn Jié in Singapore
- Died: Jüri Kukk, 41, Estonian professor of chemistry, died in a Soviet labor camp from effects of a hunger strike.

== March 28, 1981 (Saturday) ==
- Phil Mahre became the first American to ever win the world championship in skiing.
- Garuda Indonesia Flight 206 was hijacked and flown from Indonesia to Thailand.
- Born: Gareth David-Lloyd, Welsh TV actor known for portraying Ianto Jones on Torchwood;, in Bettws, Newport

== March 29, 1981 (Sunday) ==
- The first London Marathon was held, with 7,500 runners. The race was won jointly by Dick Beardsley of the United States and Inge Simonsen of Norway, who both crossed the finish line at 2:11:48.
- General Roberto Viola was sworn in as President of Argentina, succeeding General Jorge Videla. Viola would be overthrown on December 11.
- Died: Eric Williams, Prime Minister of Trinidad and Tobago since 1956. He was succeeded by George Chambers.

== March 30, 1981 (Monday) ==
- At 2:27 pm, U.S. President Ronald Reagan was shot and wounded as he walked out of the Washington Hilton hotel to his limousine. John Hinckley Jr. fired six shots from a Röhm RG-14 .22 caliber pistol, striking Press Secretary James Brady and Washington D.C. police officer Thomas Delahanty with the first two bullets, Secret Service Agent Tim McCarthy with the fourth, and the presidential limousine with the last two shots. The sixth bullet ricocheted off of the limo and struck Reagan in the underarm. Reagan was rushed into surgery at 3:24 pm and remained in the hospital for two weeks.
- The 53rd Annual Academy Awards ceremony, scheduled for that evening, was postponed to the following day.
- Indiana University won the 1981 NCAA men's basketball championship, defeating the University of North Carolina 63-50 after the NCAA elected against postponing the matchup. Virginia defeated L.S.U. 78-74 to win third place in the consolation game, which was discontinued after 1981.
- Born: Park Ji-Sung, South Korean footballer; in Seoul
- Died:
  - Thor Nis Christiansen, 23, Danish-American serial killer
  - Sherman Edwards, 61, American musical songwriter
  - DeWitt Wallace, 91, co-founder of Reader's Digest magazine
  - Edith Wilson, 84, gospel singer who also portrayed Aunt Jemima in television commercials

== March 31, 1981 (Tuesday) ==
- At 2:40 pm in Bangkok, Indonesian commandos successfully rescued all hostages on board the hijacked Garuda Indonesia Flight 206, after getting permission from Thailand authorities.—2:40 pm in Bangkok
- Chicago's Mayor Jane Byrne and her husband moved into the Cabrini–Green public housing project in an unprecedented demonstration of commitment to the needs of her lower income constituents. Byrne took up residence in Apartment 402 at 1160 Sedgewick Road for several months.
- The 53rd Annual Academy Awards ceremony was held in Los Angeles, honoring films released in 1980.
- Died:
  - Enid Bagnold, 91, British author, playwright and socialite
  - Frank Tieri, 77, former boss of New York City's Genovese crime family and the first mobster to be convicted under the RICO Act, died two months after being found guilty of extortion and racketeering. Tieri, already using bottled oxygen and a wheelchair, was admitted to New York's Mount Sinai Hospital after his illness worsened in prison.
