= April 1981 =

Month of 1981

<<	April 1981					>>
Su	Mo	Tu	We	Th	Fr	Sa
			1	2	3	4
5	6	7	8	9	10	11
12	13	14	15	16	17	18
19	20	21	22	23	24	25
26	27	28	29	30

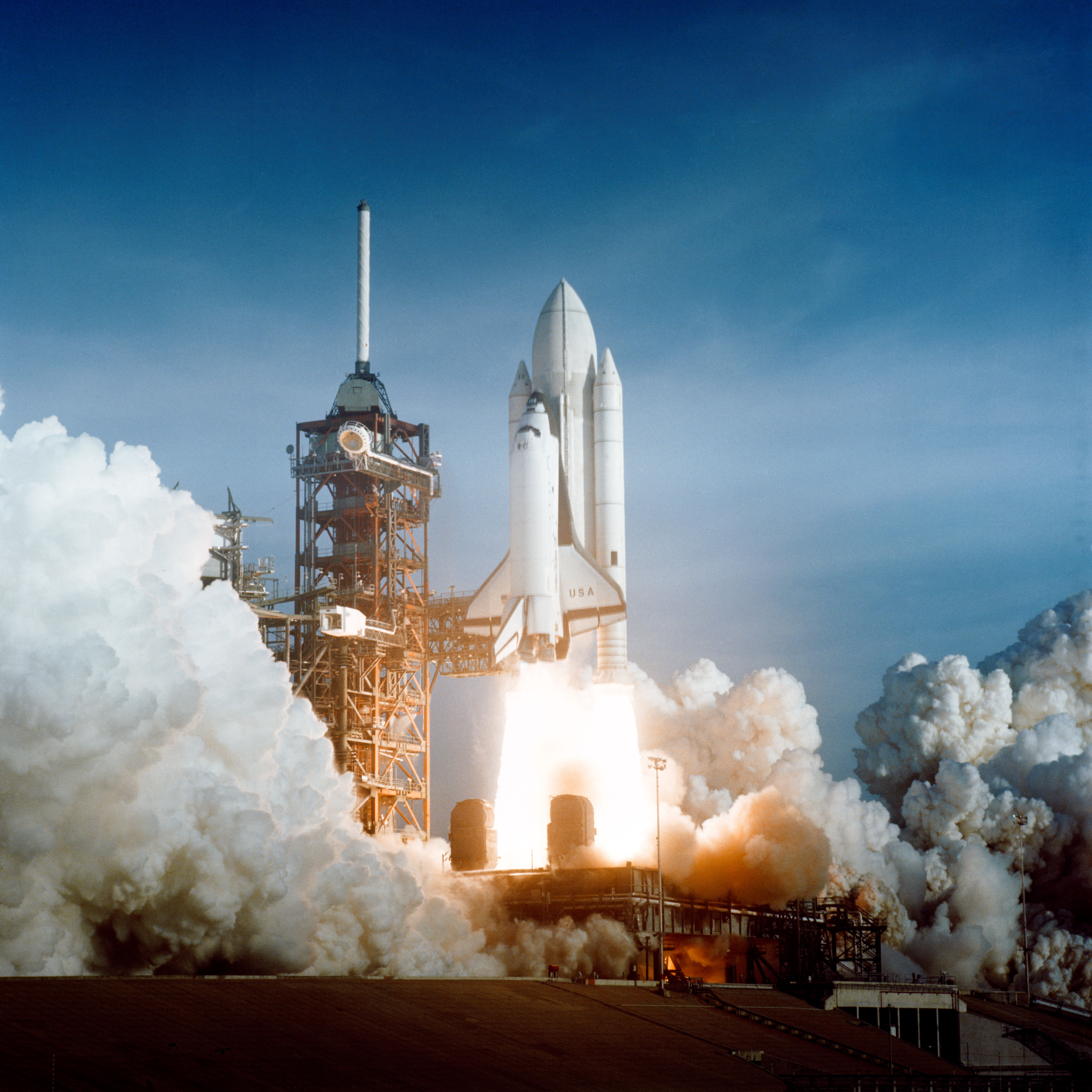
April 12, 1981: Space Shuttle era begins with U.S. launch of Columbia

The following events occurred in April 1981:

== April 1, 1981 (Wednesday) ==
- The Soviet Union implemented daylight saving time for the first time since 1930, with all clocks being set forward an hour at midnight. Many nations in Western Europe had changed the time on Sunday. (At the time, the United States did not spring forward until the last Sunday in April, April 26 in 1981.)
- The Isuzu Motor Company formally began selling its cars in the United States, becoming the sixth Japanese manufacturer to sell in the U.S.
- A videotape was shown on CNN, reportedly made during a January 6, 1981 broadcast of The Dick Maurice Show, showing psychic Tamara Rand's appearance on the talk show seen on KTNV in Las Vegas, and her amazing prediction of a March 30, 1981 event. On the tape, shown again the next day on NBC's Today and ABC's Good Morning America, Rand was seen telling Maurice that "the last few days of March or early April" would be "a crisis time" for U.S. President Ronald Reagan; that when she had the vision she felt "a thud" in her chest but that she also perceived "gunshots all over the place". Rand added that "It has to do with somebody young and radical... The only thing I can attach to it is Humbley, and maybe Jack, or something like that." Five days later, after the authenticity of the tape came into dispute, Rand and Maurice admitted that the prediction sequence had been taped the day after the March 30 attempted assassination of Reagan by John W. Hinckley Jr.

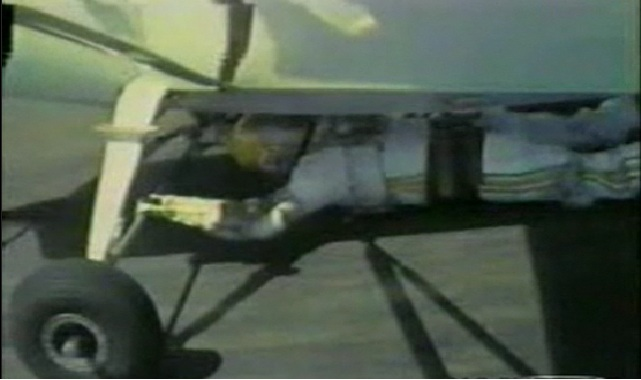
Jim Bailey's fatal stunt

- In Puʻunene, Hawaii, Australian stuntman Jim Bailey attempted to become the undercarriage of a single-engine airplane by being taken aloft on its underside. On takeoff, however, his safety harness snapped, leaving him dangling under the front landing gear about 500 feet (150 m) above ground before he fell to his death.
- Born:
  - Asli Bayram, Turkish-German actress, in Darmstadt
  - Hannah Spearritt, English singer (S Club) and actress, in Great Yarmouth

== April 2, 1981 (Thursday) ==
- Syrian airplanes bombed Lebanese Christian strongholds in Zahlé and East Beirut, renewing the Lebanese Civil War that had been on hiatus since 1976.
- The Soviet Union paid $3,000,000 to Canada to settle all claims for environmental damage that had been caused by the disintegration of the Kosmos 954 satellite on January 24, 1978.
- Born: Bethany Joy Galeotti, American actress (One Tree Hill), in Hollywood, Florida

== April 3, 1981 (Friday) ==
- After two days, an attempted coup d'état in Thailand was put down as thousands of troops took back control of Bangkok without a fight. Prem Tinsulanonda had taken King Bhumibol Adulyadej and the royal family with him to the city of Korat after General Sant Chipatima had seized control on Wednesday.
- Days before it was to be the showpiece of the California Energy Commission's conference on wind energy, the Alcoa 500 kW wind turbine at San Gorgonio Pass began turning. After only 2 1/2 hours, the turbine was out of control, a blade came loose and the structure collapsed. The embarrassment was great enough that Alcoa went no further in wind energy research.

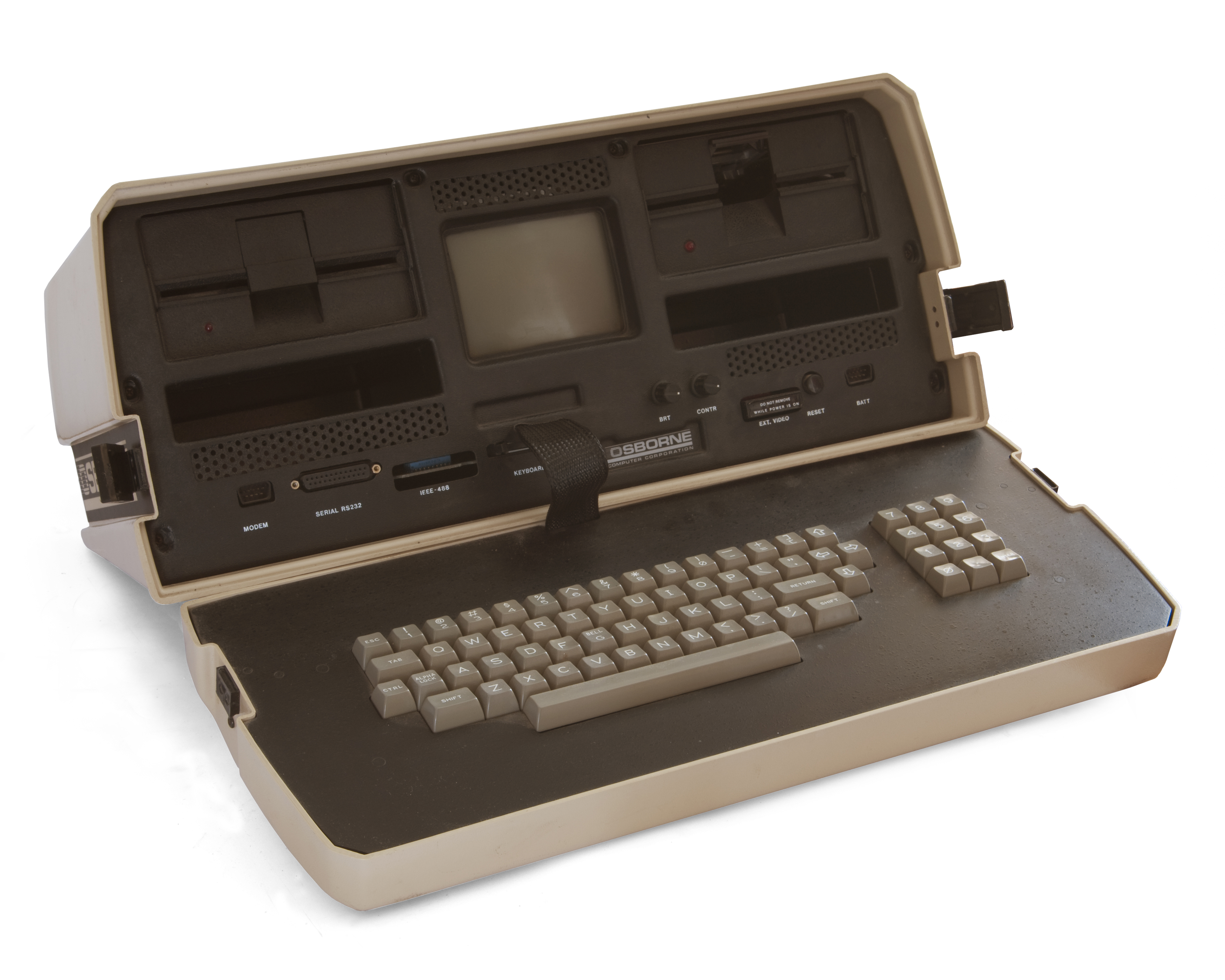
The Osborne 1

- Preceding the launch of the IBM Personal Computer by almost four months, the Osborne 1 was introduced at the 7th annual West Coast Computer Faire in San Francisco.
- Died: Juan Trippe, 81, founder of Pan American World Airways

== April 4, 1981 (Saturday) ==
- Mario Moretti, a co-founder of Red Brigades and the mastermind of the 1978 kidnapping and murder of former Italian Prime Minister Aldo Moro, was caught by police after nearly three years of pursuit.
- CERN produced the world's first proton-antiproton collisions.
- Cancer survivor Bob Champion won the 1981 Grand National at Aintree on the horse Aldaniti. His story would inspire the 1984 film Champions.
- The 127th Boat Race, the annual competition between the rowing eights the Oxford University Boat Club and the Cambridge University Boat Club, was held. Oxford was coxed by Sue Brown, the first female coxswain in the history of the event, and passed the finishing post eight lengths ahead of Cambridge, their largest margin of victory since 1898.
- Appearing for the United Kingdom, the rock band Bucks Fizz won the 26th Eurovision Song Contest in Dublin, with the song "Making Your Mind Up".
- Henry Cisneros became the first Hispanic American to be elected to lead a major United States city. The 33-year-old professor won 62% of the votes to become the new Mayor of San Antonio.

== April 5, 1981 (Sunday) ==
- Si Unyil began its run as the most successful children's television program in Indonesia.
- Born: Michael A. Monsoor, American Medal of Honor recipient, in Long Beach, California (killed in Iraq in 2006)

== April 6, 1981 (Monday) ==
- A pair of gunmen attempted to rob a branch of the Augusta Savings and Loan at the Dundalk (Maryland) Shopping Center and accidentally locked themselves out. When they departed through the exit, they found themselves surrounded by most of the officers of the Precinct 12 station of the Baltimore County, Maryland, police, which was only 250 yards (230 m) away and had been changing shifts.
- Born: Robert Earnshaw, Wales national football team striker, 2002–present; in Mufulira, Zambia

== April 7, 1981 (Tuesday) ==
- The "Soyuz '81" maneuvers by armies of the Warsaw Pact nations came to an end, allaying fears that they were a prelude to an invasion of Poland to suppress the Solidarity union. Earlier in the day, Pact commander General Kulikov had a closed meeting with Polish leaders Stanislaw Kania and Jaruselski for a commitment to get the union movement under control.
- National Guardsmen in El Salvador drove into the San Salvador neighborhood of Monte Carmelos, pulled out residents accused of rebellion against the government, and executed them. Reporters who arrived later found thirty bodies in the streets.
- The explosion of a grain elevator at Corpus Christi, Texas, killed nine people and injured 30.
- Born: Suzann Pettersen, Norwegian golfer, 2007 LPGA Champion, in Oslo
- Died: Norman Taurog, 82, American film director who won an Academy Award in 1931 for the film Skippy

== April 8, 1981 (Wednesday) ==
- In Moscow, KGB investigators arrested Vyacheslav Ivankov, an organized crime leader who was nicknamed "Yaponchik" and was the boss of the so-called "Russian Mafia".
- Born: Frédérick Bousquet, French swimmer and recordholder in 50m freestyle, in Perpignan

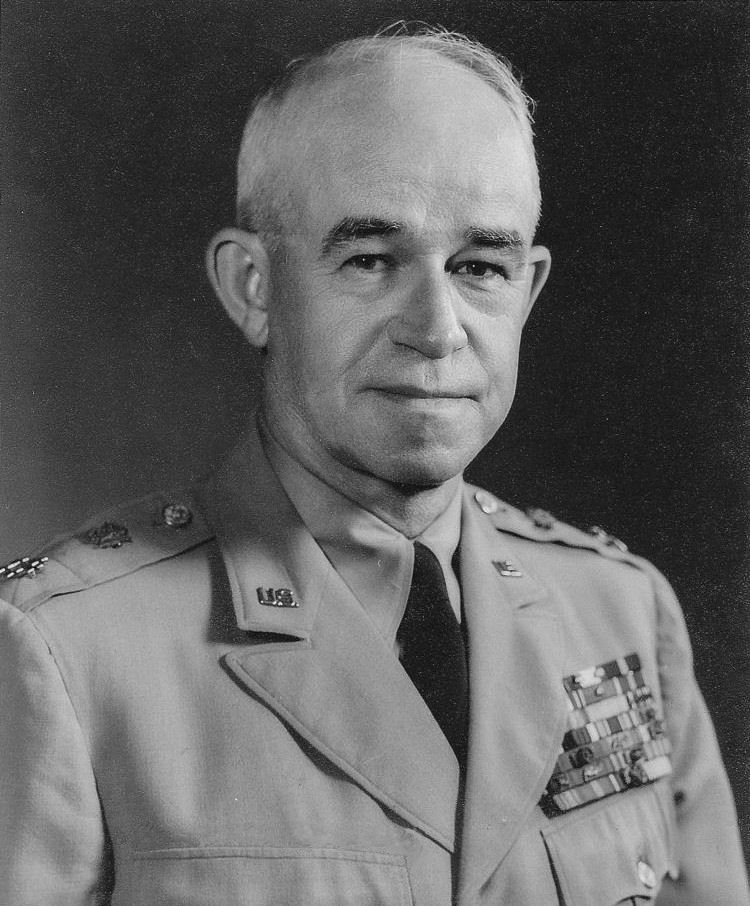
General Bradley

- Died: General of the Army Omar N. Bradley, 88, last "five-star general" in the United States

== April 9, 1981 (Thursday) ==
- The Japanese ship Nissho Maru was sunk after colliding with the USS George Washington (SSBN-598), an American nuclear submarine.
- In San Francisco, Dr. John Gullett made the first confirmed diagnosis of AIDS, a sexually transmitted disease causing Kaposi's sarcoma. Dr. Gullett reported his findings to the Centers for Disease Control two weeks later.

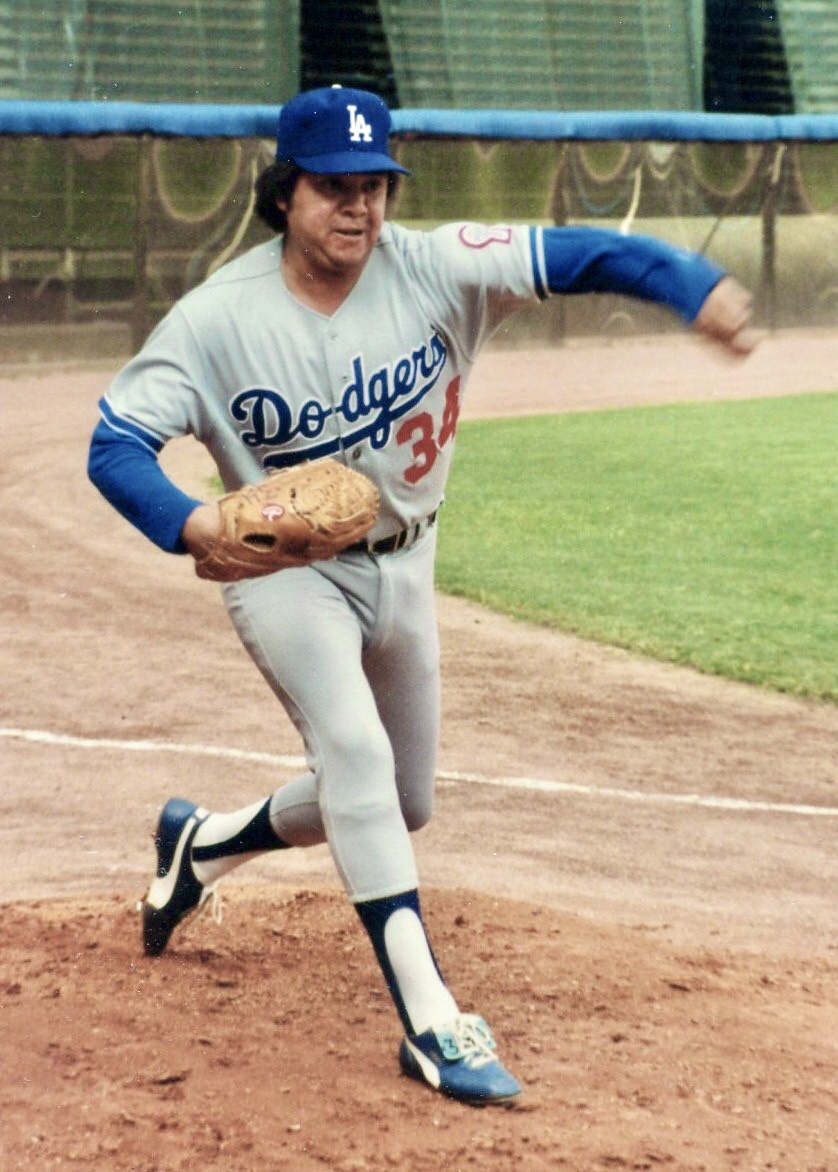
Valenzuela

- Fernando Valenzuela, a 20-year-old rookie for the Los Angeles Dodgers, pitched a 2–0 win over the Houston Astros, the first of eight consecutive wins, and one of five shutouts. In his first 8 games, he had an ERA of 0.50, though he lost 7 of the 12 games pitched afterward.
- Born: Eric Harris, American mass murderer (Columbine High School massacre), in Wichita, Kansas; committed suicide in 1999

== April 10, 1981 (Friday) ==
- Incarcerated at the H-Block of Maze Prison and on a hunger strike, Irish Republican Army member Bobby Sands was elected to the vacant Fermanagh and South Tyrone seat in the British House of Commons, with 30,492 votes for his "Anti-H-Block Party", ahead of Harry West's 29,046 votes. MP Sands would die of starvation on May 5.
- Born:
  - Gretchen Bleiler, American snowboarder and X Games gold medalist, in Toledo, Ohio
  - Laura Bell Bundy, American stage actress and country singer, in Lexington, Kentucky

== April 11, 1981 (Saturday) ==
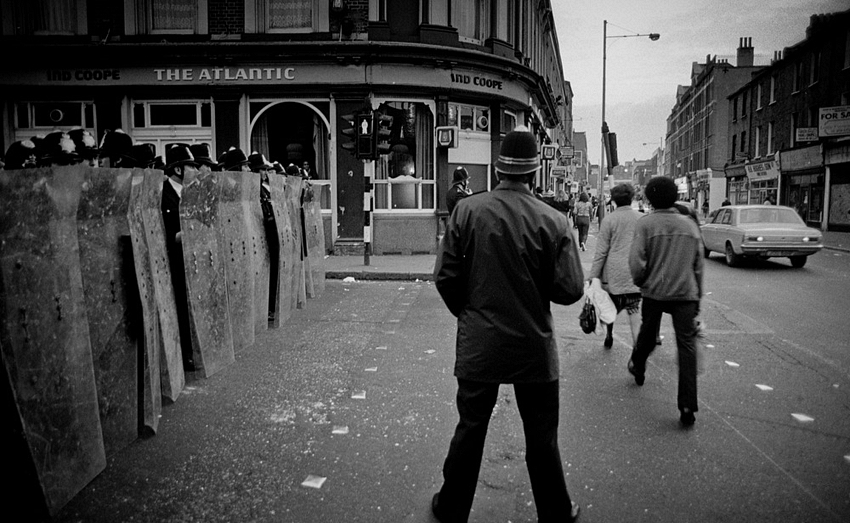
Police with riot shields in Brixton, London

- Rioting began in Brixton, a mostly black London neighborhood, after police had stopped and questioned hundreds of residents as part of "Swamp 81", an anti-crime campaign that started five days earlier. Resentment built, and at 4:45 pm, the arrest of a young black man on Atlantic Road triggered the worst race riot in England's history. A crowd broke the windows of the police van transporting the arrest subject, then set fire to an empty police car and began looting stores. By 5:30, the violence had spread to Railton Road and Mayall Road, and at 6:30, the first gasoline bombs were hurled at police cars. Order was restored by 10:00 pm. A subsequent government investigation reported that 279 policemen and at least 45 civilians were injured, noting that "In the centre of Brixton, a few hundred young people- most, but not all of them black — attacked the police on the streets... demonstrating to the millions of their fellow citizens the fragile basis of the Queen's peace. The petrol bomb was now used for the first time on the streets of Britain (the idea, no doubt, copied from the disturbances in Northern Ireland). These young people, by their criminal behaviour — for such, whatever their grievances or frustrations, it was — brought about a temporary collapse of law and order in the centre of an inner suburb of London."
- Actress Valerie Bertinelli married rock musician Eddie Van Halen, and 77-year-old actor Cary Grant married 46-year-old actress Barbara Harris.
- Died: Caroline Gordon, 85, American novelist

== April 12, 1981 (Sunday) ==
- The world's first reusable spacecraft, the Space Shuttle Columbia, was launched from Kennedy Space Center for the first time at 7:00 a.m. EST, beginning the STS-1 mission. As one historian noted later, "Never before in the history of the space program had NASA asked its astronauts to pilot a rocket or a spacecraft into space on its maiden voyage... NASA engineers counted 748 different ways in which the two astronauts on the maiden voyage of the space shuttle Columbia could die." John Young, who had gone into space four times before, and Robert Crippen, who would fly three more shuttle missions, reached orbit and returned two days later. Delayed several times, the liftoff came 20 years to the day after Yuri Gagarin had become the first man to be sent into outer space, on the April 12, 1961, liftoff of Vostok 1.

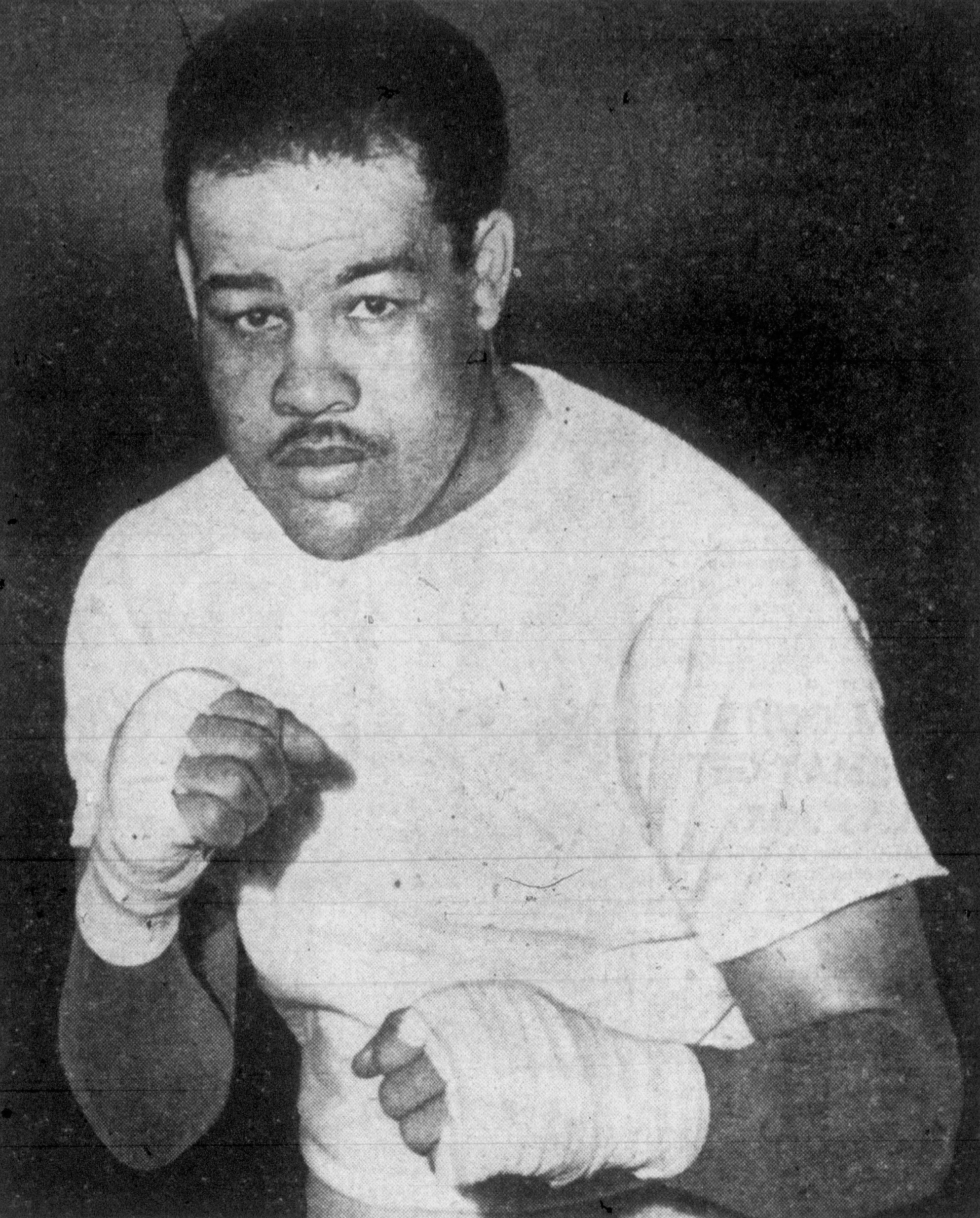
Boxing legend Joe Louis

- Died: Joe Louis, 66, American heavyweight boxing champion from 1937 to 1949; the night before, he had watched Larry Holmes defeat challenger Trevor Berbick in Las Vegas

== April 13, 1981 (Monday) ==
- The 1981 Pulitzer Prize winners were announced. John Kennedy O'Toole won the prize for fiction for A Confederacy of Dunces. Despondent over failing to find a publisher, O'Toole had killed himself 12 years earlier, on March 26, 1969. Janet Cooke of The Washington Post won the prize for feature writing, for her September 28, 1980, story "Jimmy's World", about an 8-year-old heroin addict. Two days later, the Post revealed that Cooke had confessed to fabricating the story; she returned the prize and quit her job.

== April 14, 1981 (Tuesday) ==
- At 10:21 am PST (1821 UTC), Columbia became the first crewed orbital spacecraft to land in California. Sixty minutes earlier at an altitude of 172 miles (277 km) over the Indian Ocean, astronauts Young and Crippen had taken the Space Shuttle orbiter out of orbit. During the first mission, the thermostat, the cargo doors and the zero-G toilet all malfunctioned, and some of the heat-shielding tiles had fallen off (though not from the underside of the orbiter). Columbia would fly 27 more missions. On February 1, 2003, Columbia would be destroyed and its crew of 7 killed, after leading edge wing damage led to the orbiter burning up during its return to earth.
- Died: William Henry Vanderbilt III, 79, tycoon and former Governor of Massachusetts

== April 15, 1981 (Wednesday) ==
- Fifteen coal miners were killed in an explosion at the Redstone Coal Company's Dutch Creek #1 mine. An investigation by the Colorado Bureau of Mines concluded that the cause was a spark, possibly from a damaged cable, that ignited accumulated methane gas.
- FBI agents W. Mark Felt and Edward S. Miller were pardoned by President Reagan, five months after they had been convicted of conspiracy to violate the civil rights of friends and relatives of suspected members of the Weather Underground terrorist group. In his pardon statement, Reagan said, "America was generous to those who refused to serve their country in the Vietnam War. We can be no less generous to two men who acted on high principle to bring an end to the terrorist that was threatening our nation."

== April 16, 1981 (Thursday) ==
- Sigurd Debus, an imprisoned West German terrorist who had started a hunger strike a month before Bobby Sands did the same in Northern Ireland, died after ten weeks without food. Debus had been one of 25 members of the Red Army Faction to refuse to eat in protest of imprisonment conditions. Most of the other participants called off their strike after his death.
- Canada's Prime Minister Pierre Trudeau rejected a plan, endorsed by the Premiers of eight of the nation's ten provinces, that would have allowed individual provincial legislatures to reject constitutional changes, saying that it would turn Canada into a loose confederation.
- Died: Effa Manley, 84, Negro league baseball team owner and manager (Newark Eagles) and inductee into the Baseball Hall of Fame

== April 17, 1981 (Friday) ==
- Air U.S. Flight 716, from Denver to Gillette, Wyoming, collided with a Cessna airplane carrying parachutists from the Skies West Skydiving Club of Fort Collins, Colorado. All 13 people on the airliner were killed, and two of the skydivers died. The rest of the group parachuted to safety.

== April 18, 1981 (Saturday) ==
- The Rochester Red Wings and the Pawtucket Red Sox began playing a minor league baseball game. After nine innings, the score was tied, and at the end of the 32nd inning, 4:09 the next morning, the game was halted with the score still tied at 2-2. The game would not be finished until June 23. Rochester and Pawtucket did play another game on the same Sunday, but, as one author noted, "they did not attempt to resolve their 32-inning tie then because officials of both clubs were worried that the eligible players were exhausted."
- Died: James H. Schmitz, 69, American science fiction author

== April 19, 1981 (Sunday) ==
- On Easter Sunday, Christian militia forces in Lebanon shelled the predominantly Muslim city of Sidon, killing 16 residents and injuring 60. On the same day, members of the New People's Army, the military branch of the illegal Communist Party of the Philippines, threw several hand grenades into a church at Davao City, killing 13 worshipers and injuring 177.
- Born:
  - Hayden Christensen, Canadian actor best known for portrayal of Anakin Skywalker in Episodes II and III of Star Wars, in Vancouver
  - Jonas Neubauer, American Tetris player, in Los Angeles County, California (d. 2021)
  - Troy Polamalu, American NFL player, in Garden Grove, California
  - Catalina Sandino Moreno, Colombian-born film actress (Maria Full of Grace), in Bogotá

== April 20, 1981 (Monday) ==
- Bai Hua, an award-winning author in the People's Republic of China, became the first writer to have his career ended by a government campaign against "bourgeouis liberalism" and suspected violations of the Chinese Communist Party's new "Four Cardinal Principles", beginning with an attack on the front page of the military newspaper Liberation Army Daily. China's leader Deng Xiaoping had been outraged by a film based on Bai Hua's novel Kulian (Unrequited Love). Government campaigns against other authors soon followed.
- The Inderavelly Massacre took place in the town of that name in the Indian state of Andhra Pradesh, when police fired into a crowd of Gondi tribesmen. The police reported that 13 armed protesters and one policeman were killed, while an investigating committee estimated the number at 60 or more.
- Three college students, on spring break from the University of New Brunswick, were killed after their group camped near the edge of a cliff at the Hay's Falls near Woodstock. Over a course of several minutes, the three fell 80 feet (24 m) to their deaths.
- In Omaha, the very last game of the Women's Professional Basketball League was played, as the Nebraska Wranglers defeated the Dallas Diamonds, 99–90, to win the WPBL championship in the fifth game of the best of five series.

== April 21, 1981 (Tuesday) ==
- Soldiers of the Army of Guatemala entered the village of Acul, near Santa Maria Nebaj in the Guatemalan highlands, and executed most of the adult men for suspected collaboration with leftist guerillas. "Within two weeks," an investigator for the government noted in 1997, "the village was empty, and the army burned every house and field of corn in Acul". The village would be rebuilt two years later.
- Died:
  - Dorothy Eady, 73, English born Egyptologist who claimed to be "Omm Sety", a reincarnated priestess from the 13th Century BC
  - Eddie Sauter, 66, American bandleader and jazz composer

== April 22, 1981 (Wednesday) ==
- The first zero-coupon bonds were issued, as the J.C. Penney Company offered $200,000,000 worth of bonds that paid no periodic interest, dividends or other money until maturity. For $332.47 an investor would receive a "zero" that would pay $1,000 at its maturity date of May 1, 1989, for a 14.25% annual interest rate.
- Four gunmen, wearing Halloween masks, robbed the First National Bank of Arizona in Tucson. Taking $3.3 million, they accomplished the largest American bank robbery up to that time.
- In one of the first of many corporate mergers in the 1980s, food producers Nabisco, Inc. acquired Standard Brands, Inc., in a stock transaction valued at $1.9 billion, to create Nabisco Brands, Inc.
- Born: Ken Dorsey, American NFL and CFL quarterback, in Orinda, California

== April 23, 1981 (Thursday) ==
- American CIA Director William J. Casey had an audience with Pope John Paul II in Rome concerning U.S. support for the Solidarity union in Poland. On the same day, Soviet Politburo members Mikhail Suslov and K.V. Rusakov met in Warsaw with the entire Politburo of Poland's Communist Party on its failure to control Solidarity.
- At the Empire State Building in New York City, workers unearthed a copper box containing the time capsule that had been placed in the building's cornerstone on September 9, 1930. Nearly all of the contents from 50 years earlier, including construction plans, paper money, photographs and that day's newspapers, had been "rotted beyond recognition" by water that had seeped in.
- Born:
  - Sean Henn, American Major League Baseball pitcher, in Fort Worth, Texas
  - Lady Gabriella Kingston (born Gabriella Marina Alexandra Ophelia Windsor), English journalist, daughter of Prince Michael of Kent and Princess Michael of Kent, in London, England
  - Chris Sharma, American rock climber, in Santa Cruz, California
- Died: Josep Pla, 84, Spanish journalist and author

== April 24, 1981 (Friday) ==
- U.S. President Ronald Reagan ended the grain embargo that been instituted by President Carter on January 7, 1980, and which had restricted the sale of American grain to the Soviet Union following the Soviet invasion of Afghanistan. In his announcement, Reagan said, "American farmers have been unfairly singled out to bear the burden of this ineffective policy."
- On the same day, President Reagan sent a handwritten letter to Soviet General Secretary (and, as Chairman of the Presidium, Soviet head of state) Leonid Brezhnev to open a dialogue between the United States and the Soviet Union. Biographer Lou Cannon would later describe the missive as "one of the few foreign policy documents composed by Reagan... without the assistance of speechwriters or formal position papers from his various departments". Reagan, who composed the letter from his hospital bed while recovering from the attempt on his life, opened with a reference to a meeting during Brezhnev's 1973 visit to California, when Reagan had been Governor, asking "Is it possible that we have permitted ideology, political and economic philosophies, and governmental policies to keep us from considering the very real, everyday problems of peoples?"
- In Hama, Syria, the Syrian Army randomly arrested more than 150 men and teenaged boys, then shot them. The massacre was in retaliation for the April 21 attack of an army patrol by guerillas of the Muslim Brotherhood, based in Hama.

== April 25, 1981 (Saturday) ==
- The Soviet Union launched Kosmos 1267 to carry the unmanned TKS spacecraft, a vehicle that could provide a space ferry to bring back returning cosmonauts, as well as providing an additional component to an orbiting space station. The TKS module would remain in orbit until it docked automatically with Salyut 6 on June 19, as the first successful expansion of an orbiting craft, an accomplishment described as "an important step toward the later development of Mir and the International Space Station". Once docked, the engines of the Kosmos were used to make orbital changes for the Salyut station. On July 29, 1982, the engines would be used one final time to bring both modules out of orbit, where they burned up over the Pacific Ocean.
- Born:
  - Wojciech Kasperski, Polish filmmaker, in Kartuzy
  - Anja Pärson, Swedish women's alpine skiing champion, in Umeå

== April 26, 1981 (Sunday) ==
- The first successful fetal surgery was performed by Dr. Michael R. Harrison at the University of California at San Francisco hospital. The patient was born at the UCSF Hospital two weeks later, on May 10, 1981, and named Michael.
- In the first round of the French presidential election, none of the 10 candidates on the ballot received a majority of the votes. The top two finishers, incumbent President Valéry Giscard d'Estaing and Socialist challenger François Mitterrand, won 28.3% and 25.8% of the vote respectively, and qualified for the May 10 runoff election. Paris Mayor Jacques Chirac (17.9%) and Communist Party leader Georges Marchais (15.3%) were the next highest vote getters. The other candidates were Huguette Bouchardeau, Michel Crepeau, Michel Debre, Marie-France Garaud, Arlette Laguiller and Brice Lalonde.
- The first nationwide voting in Vietnam, since the 1976 forced unification of the North and South republics, was conducted for the National Assembly. Although all of the candidates had been chosen by the Communist Party's "Fatherland Front", there were 614 candidates for the 496 seats.
- Died: Jim Davis, 71, American TV actor who had been portraying Jock Ewing on Dallas

== April 27, 1981 (Monday) ==
- Operation Red Dog, a plot to overthrow the government of the Commonwealth of Dominica, was foiled when FBI agents arrested ten mercenary soldiers near New Orleans as they were preparing to sail toward the Caribbean island nation with a cache of weapons. Led by Michael Eugene Perdue, the group of white supremacists had planned to take control of the government of the mostly black nation, after freeing former Prime Minister Patrick John (also black) from a Dominican jail, and being appointed to high government positions.

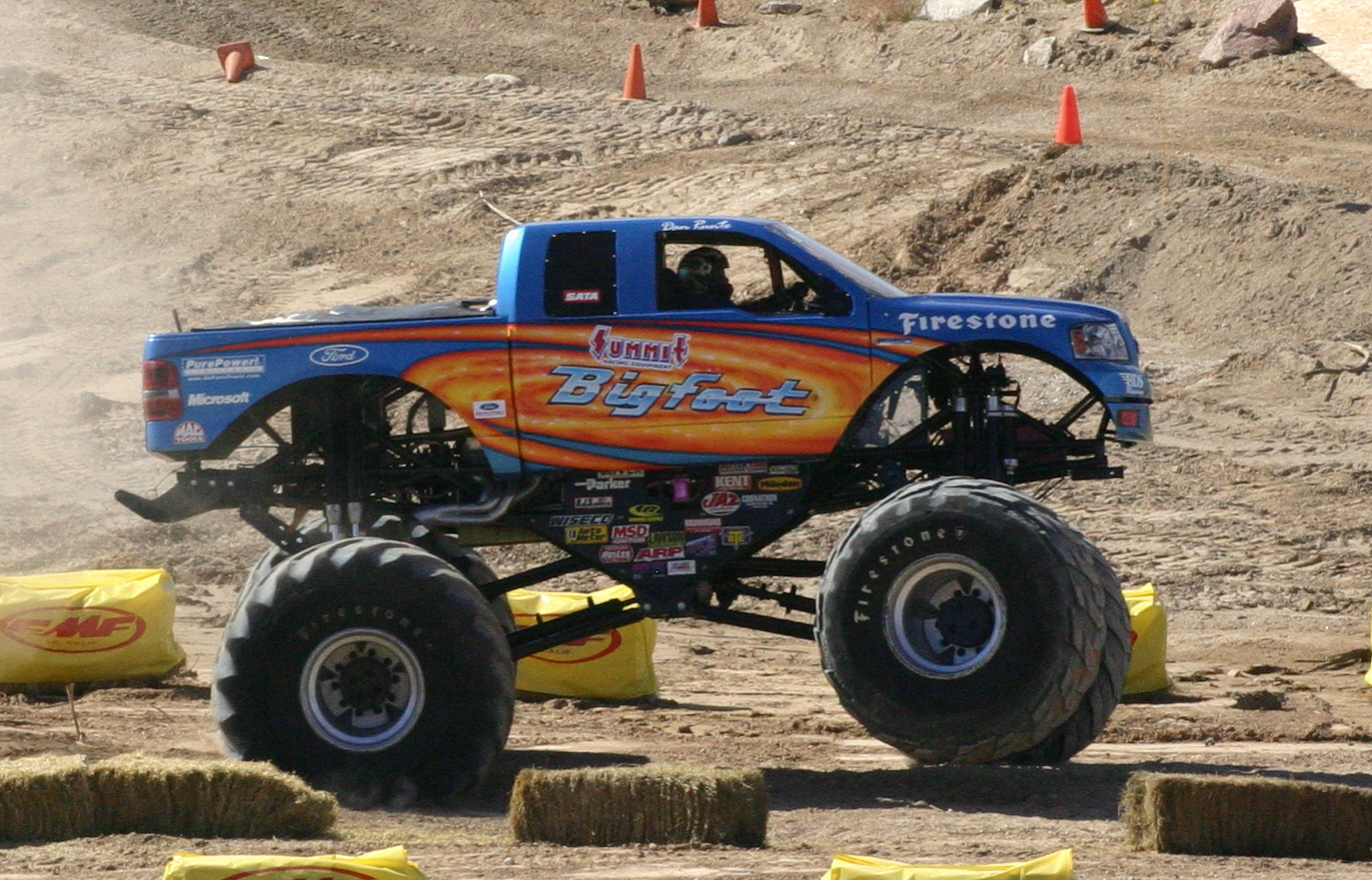
"Bigfoot"

- "Bigfoot", the first "monster truck", was created by Bob Chandler, who had envisioned a vehicle with tires so large that it could crush anything in its path. On this date, Chandler gave the first test run of "Bigfoot" at a field near St. Louis, Missouri, and rolled it over abandoned cars. The first major event in the new sport of monster truck competition would take place on April 9, 1983, at the Pontiac Silverdome, before a crowd of 68,000.

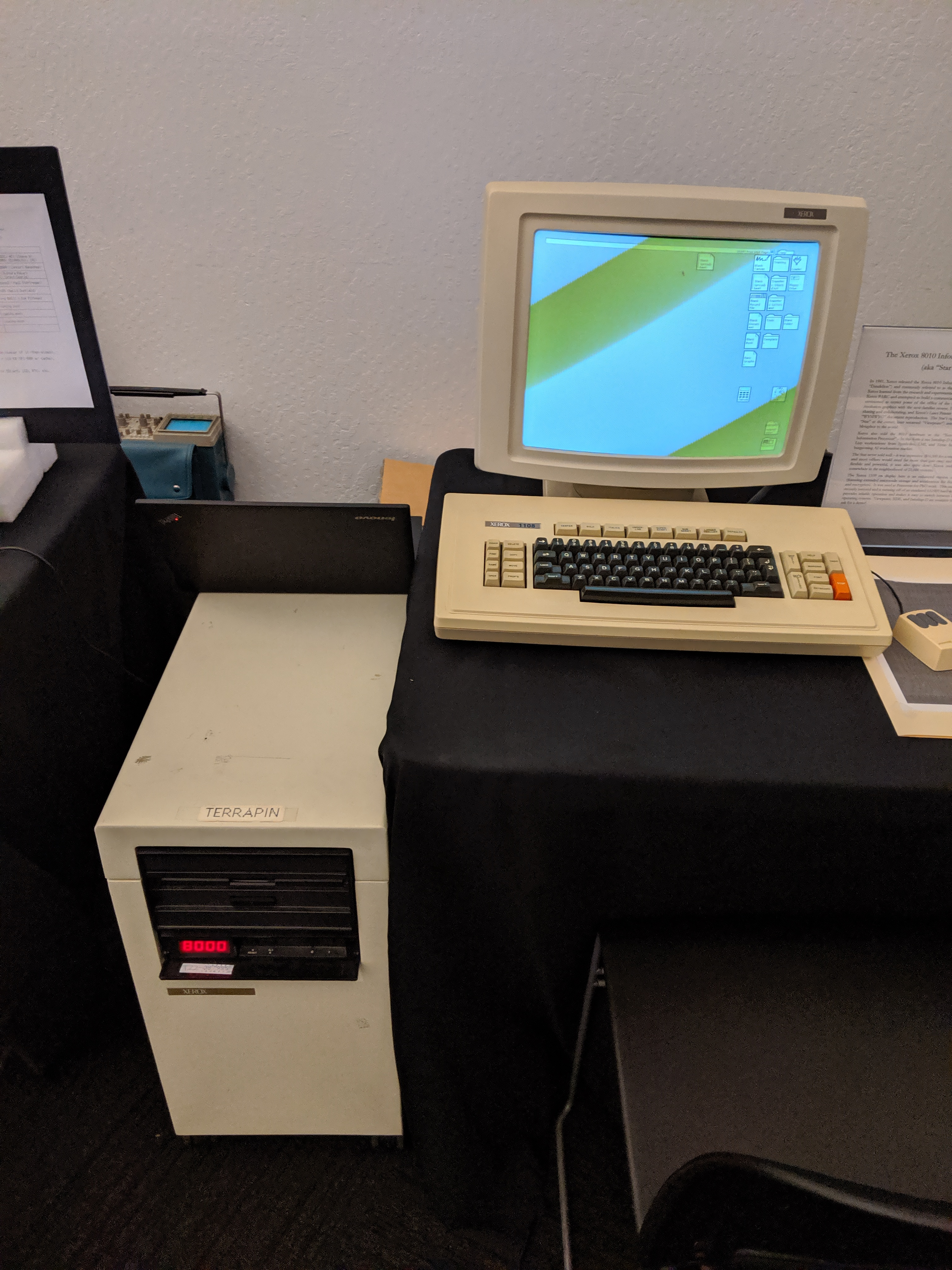
The Xerox Star; note the mouse to the right of the keyboard

- The Xerox 8010 Star Information System, the first personal computer to include a mouse in the two-button format used today for a right-click and left-click function, went on sale for the first time. In a press release, the Xerox Corporation described the 8010's capabilities and then noted that "All of these jobs require only four main function keys on the keyboard, plus the 'mouse,' which controls a 'pointer' that moves around the screen to choose from alternative functions."
- Former U.S. Vice President Spiro Agnew was ordered to pay $248,735 to the U.S. state of Maryland after losing a civil lawsuit against him. The damages from the lawsuit arose from kickbacks of $147,500 that he had accepted from contractors when he was the Governor of Maryland, and $101,235 in interest. Judge Bruce Williams wrote that "Mr. Agnew had no lawful right to this money under any theory." Agnew paid the sum in 1983 after two unsuccessful appeals. In 1989, Agnew asked the Internal Revenue Service for a deduction from his taxable income, and was denied.
- John Eric Hastrick, a 20-year-old British visitor to the Grand Canyon in the U.S., from Radlett-Hertz in London, fell 330 feet (100 m) to his death from the Rim Trail in Grand Canyon National Park. Mr. Hastrick had climbed over a rock wall and was backing up toward the edge of a cliff while looking for the right spot to photograph the Bright Angel Lodge.

== April 28, 1981 (Tuesday) ==
- The government of Prime Minister of Australia Malcolm Fraser survived a vote of no confidence that had been moved for by the Australian Labor Party. The vote in the Australian House of Representatives was 71–47 against the resolution.
- For the first time, Israel intervened directly in the war between Syria and Lebanese Christians, as Israeli jets shot down two Syrian helicopters, killing four crewmen.
- Professional tennis champion Billie Jean King was sued for support by Marilyn Barnett, a woman who stated in her complaint that they were lesbian lovers. After initially denying the accusations, King admitted to the affair four days later.
- Born: Jessica Alba, American actress (Dark Angel), in Pomona, California
- Died: Mickey Walker, 79, American boxer; world welterweight champion 1922–1926, world middleweight champion 1926–1931

== April 29, 1981 (Wednesday) ==
- U.S. Representative Raymond F. Lederer (D-Pa.) resigned his office, one day after the House Ethics Committee had voted 10–2 to recommend his expulsion from the United States Congress. Lederer had won re-election in 1980 while under indictment for taking a bribe following the FBI's Abscam investigation and was convicted of felony charges on January 9.
- Steve Carlton became the seventh pitcher to have 3,000 strikeouts, and the first left-handed pitcher, in a game between the Philadelphia Phillies and Montreal Expos; Tom Seaver of the Cincinnati Reds had become the sixth on April 18 against the St. Louis Cardinals. The first five were Walter Johnson (1923), Bob Gibson (1974), Gaylord Perry (1978) and Nolan Ryan (1980).

== April 30, 1981 (Thursday) ==
- In elections for the Volksraad, lower house of South Africa's Parliament, the ruling National Party captured 131 of the 165 seats. The Progressive Federal Party (26 seats) and the New Republic Party (8 seats) won the other offices. Only White citizens, roughly 10% of the adult population, were allowed to vote.
- Promoting itself as the "no-frills airline", People Express began low cost trips to and from its hub at the Newark Liberty International Airport in New Jersey. A ticket for the inaugural flight, from Newark to Buffalo, was priced at only $23.
- The Anheuser-Busch brewing company began test marketing of its lower calorie beer, Bud Light, which was then introduced nationwide in the summer of 1982.
