= Secrets & Mysteries =

- Cover of "Volume 1" VHS.
- Starring: Edward Mulhare
- Country of origin: United States
- No. of seasons: 1
- No. of episodes: 26

Production
- Running time: 22 minutes

Original release
- Release: 1988 – 1989

Related
- Unsolved Mysteries, Sightings, In Search of...

Secrets & Mysteries is a television series which originally aired in syndication from 1988 to 1989. It was hosted by Irish actor Edward Mulhare and dealt with topics of a paranormal nature, as well as mysterious historical events. It was similar to the 1970s/1980s series In Search of....

"Secrets of the Unknown invites you into the world of the bizarre, strange, and unusual. From ninjas who are said to transform into panthers, to the peculiar myths and rituals surrounding King Tutankhamun's tomb, to Adolf Hitler's occult connections, the sinking of the Titanic, the disappearance of Amelia Earhart, Bigfoot, UFOs, ghosts, dreams and nightmares, the Hindenburg disaster, and other subjects. These documentaries provide a rich visual showcase for unexplained phenomena."

The series is considered a pioneer in the realm of historical and paranormal investigative television, and is also considered to be something of a cult classic among many fans. The series consists of 26 episodes, written by Erik Nelson and produced by Craig Haffner. It was released on home video in the late 1980s to the early 2000s under the title Secrets of the Unknown.

== Opening sequence ==
After a brief introduction of what the episode had in store, the opening sequence would feature a series of provocative images to set the tone of the show. A series of 3-D images reveal a mansion on top of Devil's Tower. Other images featured the Hindenburg disaster followed by the sinking of the Titanic and a pyramid featuring the all-seeing eye, tarot cards and Stonehenge. The title sequence would form over the mansion with a figure in the window. The figure would turn and reveal himself to be host Edward Mulhare. "It's time for our journey to begin." He would look into an old-fashioned zoetrope machine, which would feature preview images of the episode topic. Mulhare would then throw a switch, powering the mechanisms on the set and begin his opening narration.

== Releases ==
There have been several VHS releases over the years. The series has yet to be released on DVD or Blu-ray. All titles listed below remain out of print.

| Name | Release date | Ep #!Additional information | |
|---|---|---|---|
| Secrets of the Unknown: Volume 1 | August 30, 1989 | 4 | Includes "Space," "Stonehenge," "Lake Monsters" and "Big Foot." |
| Secrets of the Unknown: Volume 2 | August 30, 1989 | 4 | Includes "Powers of the Mind," "Psychic Detectives," "Witches" and "Curses." |
| Secrets of the Unknown: Volume 3 | August 30, 1989 | 4 | Includes "The Hindenburg," "Pearl Harbor," "The Lusitania" and "Amelia Earhart." |
| Secrets of the Unknown: Volume 4 | August 30, 1989 | 4 | Includes "Life After Death," "Nostradamus," "Mystic Hitler" and "Poltergeists." |
| Secrets of the Unknown: Volume 5 | August 30, 1989 | 4 | Includes "English Ghosts," "Hollywood Hauntings," "Tornadoes" and "Volcanoes." |
| Secrets of the Unknown: Bigfoot & Witches | 1996 | 2 | Includes episodes "Bigfoot" and "Witches", re-released under the Blockbuster Presents label. |
| Secrets of the Unknown: Tornadoes & UFOs | 1996 | 2 | Includes episodes "Tornadoes" and "UFOs", re-released under the Blockbuster Presents label. |
| Secrets of the Unknown (Individual episode releases) | May 29, 2001 | 1 (x26) | All 26 episodes were released individually with each VHS tape including 1 episode. |

== Episodes ==
Episodes are listed alphabetically by title rather than production or air date order. Production codes and premiere dates remain unknown.

| No. | Title |
|---|---|
| - | "Amelia Earhart" |
"Amelia Earhart" explores the mysterious disappearance of America's beloved aviator during a highly publicized around-the-world flight in 1937. Since she vanished, speculation on the flight pioneer's demise has been an ongoing source of controversy.
| - | "Big Foot" |
"Big Foot" brings together eyewitnesses who relate their encounters with the legendary and mysterious creature. The film probes the question of whether Big Foot, Sasquatch, and Yeti are myth or reality. Film highlights include possible authentic footage of the beasts.
| - | "Curses" |
"Curses" examines historical hexes. Learn the fate of those who had contact with the Hope diamond after it was stolen from an idol in India. In ancient Egypt, people protected the deceased from thieves by placing curses on tombs. Discover the events and peculiar deaths which occurred following the discovery of Tutankhamun's tomb. See how voodoo worshipers cast spells of harm.
| - | "'Dreams and Nightmares'" |
"Dreams and Nightmares" journeys into the human subconscious. Peering under the brain's mysterious veil, the idea that dreams send clues and warnings from another dimension is examined in detail.
| - | "English Ghosts" |
"English Ghosts" takes a close look at the reality of spirits. It provides startling evidence and compelling tales supporting the existence of apparitions, including the White Lady and Black Friar.
| - | "The Hindenburg" |
"The Hindenburg" investigates the 1937 catastrophic fire aboard the German zeppelin, which experienced one of the most devastating aviation accidents in history. The cause of the tragedy that took 35 lives remains unsolved. Was it sabotage or insurance fraud which destroyed the luxurious flying hotel?
| - | "Hollywood Haunting" |
"Hollywood Haunting" explores the mysteries surrounding Hollywood stars and their ghostly comebacks. Viewers decide for themselves whether sightings of legends such as Jean Harlow, Lionel Barrymore, and Harry Houdini are truth or fiction. Highlights include an investigation of John Wayne's haunted yacht.
| - | "Jack the Ripper" |
"Jack the Ripper" explores theories surrounding one of the most notorious unsolved crimes of modern times. Between August 7 and November 10, 1888, Jack the Ripper terrorized London, killing at least seven women. Was the murderer one man or three?
| - | "Lake Monsters" |
"Lake Monsters" examines in depth the myths and legends surrounding seafaring monsters. Learn the stories of "Nessie," the Loch Ness monster, first sighted during the sixth century. Film highlights include actual footage of "Chessie," the water creature spotted in the Chesapeake Bay since the 1930s.
| - | "Life After Death" |
"Life After Death" explores the ultimate unknown through the beliefs of various cultures. Hear what people have to say who have had near-death experiences. Peer into the next life for answers to this age-old mystery.
| - | "The Lusitania" |
"The Lusitania" explores the mysteries surrounding the most dramatic World War I conflict over German submarine warfare. A British cargo and passenger ship, the Lusitania, was hit by a German torpedo in May 1915. The cause of subsequent explosions within its hull remains a puzzle. Theories suggest the ship may have been carrying contraband ammunition.
| - | "Mystic Hitler" |
"Mystic Hitler" explores evidence that Adolf Hitler called upon the powers of the occult to mesmerize the masses in his plot to rule the world.
| - | "Ninja, the Real Story" |
"Ninja, the Real Story" examines the supposedly magical warriors of the East. The film traces ninja history from its 14th-century origins and explores the martial arts masters' mysterious ability to transform themselves into panthers and beasts of prey.
| - | "Nostradamus" |
"Nostradamus" examines the medieval French physician's famous predictions. One of the world's most widely known and read prophets, Nostradamus is acknowledged for the remarkable accuracy with which he has foretold future events. Learn which of his predictions have already come true and what may lie ahead for mankind.
| - | "Pearl Harbor" |
"Pearl Harbor" reveals information indicating that the United States Navy could have prevented the December 7, 1941 attack. Explore the supposition that the Navy discovered two Japanese carriers near Pearl Harbor several days prior to the assault and why this information was ignored.
| - | "Poltergeists" |
"Poltergeists" examines just what it is that goes bump in the night. Hear eyewitness tales of the mischievous, malevolent spirits, which are believed to make strange noises, move objects, and produce abnormal odors. Video highlights include actual footage of a haunting in progress.
| - | "Powers of the Mind" |
"Powers of the Mind" explores the mysteries of the human brain, looking at the amazing abilities of the mind and examining phenomena such as psychic premonition and mental telepathy.
| - | "Psychic Detectives" |
"Psychic Detectives" looks at the people who, with their paranormal abilities, help law enforcement agencies shed light on unsolvable crimes. See actual cases in which police employed psychics help in the investigation process.
| - | "Pyramids" |
"Pyramids" explores the grandeur and mysteries of the magnificent Egyptian structures which have fascinated humans for more than 2,000 years. Learn the legends and powers of these architectural wonders.
| - | "Space" |
"Space" delves into the mysteries of the universe. Explore the vast frontier and see what is in store for space travel.
| - | "Stonehenge" |
"Stonehenge" examines the history and many theories surrounding the ancient monument. Created from huge boulders, Stonehenge stands on the Salisbury Plain in Wiltshire, England. Was it constructed for human sacrifice or astronomy? These compelling questions and others are explored.
| - | "The Titanic" |
"The Titanic" unravels the mysteries surrounding the 1912 sea disaster which sent 1,500 people to a watery grave in the mid-Atlantic after colliding with an iceberg. Did the luxury liner's crew have fair warning, but fail to react appropriately? The program presents new evidence and insights into the calamity which still baffles historians.
| - | "Tornadoes" |
"Tornadoes" explores nature's deadly spirals. Highlights include actual footage of the violent force and the mass destruction that tornadoes create.
| - | "UFOs" |
"UFOs" explores reports of unidentified flying objects from caveman to modern times. Highlights include never-before-seen images of possible extraterrestrial life.
| - | "Volcanoes" |
"Volcanoes" examines the fiery force some call "messengers from hell." Highlights include footage of the 1980 eruption of Mount St. Helens, which blasted the northern face from the mountain and affected Earth's climate for three years.
| - | "Witches" |
"Witches" explores the long and clandestine history of this misunderstood group of people. It provides a close look at the black art, and features factual information presented by practitioners.
