= Greater Ministries International =

American Christian-based fraud (1993–1999)

- Company type: Evangelical ministry
- Industry: Religion
- Founded: 1993, Tampa, Florida, U.S.
- Headquarters: Tampa, Florida
- Key people: Gerald Payne, Director

Greater Ministries International was an Evangelical Christian ministry that ran a Ponzi scheme in an affinity fraud that had taken nearly 500 million dollars from 18,000 people by the time it was shut down by federal authorities in August 1999. Headed by Gerald Payne in Tampa, Florida, the ministry bribed church leaders around the United States. Payne and other church elders promised the church members double their money back in 17 months or fewer, citing Biblical scripture. However, nearly all the money was lost and hidden away. Church leaders received prison sentences ranging from 12 1/2 years to 27 years.

The group had ties to Stayton, Oregon-based Embassy of Heaven, run by Glen Stoll, which was later closed by the Justice Department.

Their group founded a newspaper, the "Greater Bible College" in Tampa, a line of "Greater Live" herbal remedies, cancer treatments ("We actually pull the cancer right out of your stomach", Payne claimed.), a supplement called "Beta 1, 3rd Glucan" (to survive "end-times plagues",) and plans for "Greater Lands", an independent country (an "Ecclesiastical Domain ... similar to the Vatican") where other governments would have no jurisdiction.

== In popular culture ==
In 2007, the first story on the episode "Religious Prey: Greater Ministries Int'l / It Takes a Thief", of the television series American Greed, covered the fraudulent criminal actions of Greater Ministries International, including a prison interview with Gerald Payne insisting that God Himself was still going to refund all the stolen funds.
