= Leland Kent =

American photographer

Leland Kent is an American photographer known for photographing abandoned and forgotten places across the Southeast. He has published six photography books: Abandoned Birmingham, Abandoned Georgia: Exploring the Peach State, Abandoned Georgia: Traveling the Backroads, Abandoned New Orleans, Abandoned North Florida and Abandoned Alabama: Exploring the Heart of Dixie.

== Biography ==
Leland Ross Kent was born in Corpus Christi, Texas on August 30, 1984. He was raised in Birmingham, Alabama and received his bachelor's degree at the University of Alabama at Birmingham; however, he discovered his passion was in photography and taught himself the art on his own. He currently resides in Florida with his wife and their son.

== Career ==
Since 2014, Kent has photographed dozens of historic and forgotten places from across the Southeast. He posts his findings to his blog www.abandonedsoutheast.com. Searching through deserted sites come with many different risks. Kent tries to acquire permission from each location he photographs; however, there are some considered off limits, in which case he's had to trespass. Some places come with other risks, such as falling through rotting floors, coming in contact with debris, bio-hazardous waste, discarded body parts, and encountering homeless people, drug addicts, and animals. During an exploration at an abandoned factory in Florida, Kent came across a huge black snake that chased him out of the building.

During an interview with Inside Edition, Kent was asked about his favorite place to photograph. He stated, "I would probably say my most favorite is the Masonic Temple in Birmingham – that's where I grew up. It's one of the first places I've explored and it was almost kind of like a museum. It was closed up and kind of forgotten about for years and it's really unique to see. That kind of history is something so unique and ornate." He goes on to say, "I feel like I'm kind of doing a favor by saving the place, saving the history of it."

== Bibliography ==
Leland Kent's books are part of the "Abandoned" series published by Arcadia Publishing. This series includes 45 books from photographers who capture photos of various abandoned buildings across the U.S.

- Abandoned Birmingham: (published July 30, 2018) Birmingham became an industrial enterprise after the Civil War due to their abundance of iron ore, limestone, and coal; three ingredients used to create steel. Due to its growth in resources, it has been nicknamed the “Magic City” and “Pittsburgh of the South”. After almost a century of growth and success, the industries began to shrivel, leaving behind a variety of abandoned structures. For the past several years, some of those structures have been reconstructed and refurbished, and many are still left untouched. Leland Kent gives an inside look of the city's many abandoned factories and buildings.
- Abandoned Georgia: Exploring the Peach State: (published November 26, 2018) Georgia has many abandoned places, ranging from a little amusement park to one of the word's largest mental asylums. Leland Kent captures photos of forgotten sites across the state of Georgia.
- Abandoned New Orleans: (published March 25, 2019) After experiencing the worst hurricane ever in 2005, Hurricane Katrina, New Orleans was left in almost complete destruction. Years after the hurricane and after reconstruction of many historic landmarks, structures, and homes, many buildings are still left desolate. Leland Kent presents eight locations that were affected by Katrina, including a hospital where people were trapped during Katrina and a WWII internment camp called Camp Algier.
- Abandoned Georgia: Traveling the Backroads: (published May 27, 2019) During his travels through Georgia's backroads, Leland Kent discovered fourteen abandoned locations. This book features some of Georgia's forgotten locations including a tiny hidden school and a widespread religious community.

== Reception ==
Kent's works have appeared on a number of television programs and worldwide publications including CNBC's American Greed, CNN Travel, MSN, Yahoo News, CBS Inside Edition, Daily Mail, The Sun, AL.com, BHAMNOW, NOLA.com, Insight TV, and SATI (a German-based television network)
