= Dina Wein Reis =

American scammer (born 1964)

Dina Wein Reis (born 1964) is a financial criminal who employed business scams to defraud her victims of tens of millions of dollars.

On May 19, 2011, Wein Reis pleaded guilty to one count of intent to commit fraud after being charged in 2006 on six counts associated with a 15-year-long series of illegal business activities. Her multi-million dollar crime was covered by the CNBC television series American Greed, in the second half of the 2016 episode "Seattle Roasted / The Stealing Socialite". Her plea agreement limited her to a $1 million fine, federal prison time of 19 months, and $5.7 million in restitution on the $80 million that she defrauded from her victims.

== Wire Fraud ==
In October 2008, prosecutors claimed that, over a 15-year period, Wein Reis's company had tricked manufacturers into selling her merchandise at a low price, defrauding them of tens of millions of dollars. She and her associates would call senior company executives with an offer of a high-paying job, taking over from her as chief executive officer of her company so she could step back and focus on her philanthropy; the offer included equity in her (non-existent) company and a guaranteed four-year contract with an $8,000,000 salary. Then, she would ask the executive to send her a shipment of merchandise from his current company, and she promised access to lucrative markets through her "National Distribution Program", which did not actually exist. The lies included a story that she would hand out the merchandise as free samples at hundreds of establishments across the United States, and also guaranteed exclusive product placement at national chain stores – with the product's competitors being denied shelf access. She would rent a store or pharmacy to set up shelves full of a competing product, then take the potential fraud victim to see the store, stating that this was an example of a chain with which her company had arranged an exclusive agreement for the competitor.

Once she received all shipments of product from her target's company: the target would hear nothing further from Wein Reis regarding the supposed offer to take over as CEO of her company; the offer of exclusive product placement for the target's company at national chain stores never took place; and, instead of handing out samples for free as stated, Wein Reis would sell the products to middlemen who then sold them to retailers, in a practice known as product diversion. While large companies do use diversion to deal with their own excess inventory, at prices they negotiate with the diverting firm, Wein Reis was lying to the executives about what she was doing with the merchandise; she was arrested in October 2008 and charged on 6 counts for procuring the merchandise through fraud, defrauding 160 consumer companies out of more than $80 million.

On May 19, 2011, Wein Reis pleaded guilty, under a plea agreement, to a single count of conspiracy to commit wire fraud. In April 2013, she was sentenced to 19 months in federal prison; in addition, Wein Reis agreed to pay a $1 million fine and $5.7 million in restitution to her victims.

== Personal life ==
Wein Reis' criminal activities supported extensive aspects of her personal life. While perpetrating her multi-million dollar fraud, Wein Reis used some of the criminal proceeds to finance stage and television productions, fund philanthropic deeds, and purchase millions of dollars' worth of art for her home. She hosted fund raising parties for such institutions as the Whitney Museum of American Art. In 2008, before pleading guilty to her criminal activities, while her lawyers were working to get her released on bond (set at $10 million), they submitted many letters of support, including one from Barbara Haskell, curator of the Whitney Museum.
