= Danny Pang (financier) =

American businessman, financier and fraudster

Danny Pang (Chinese: 彭日成; pinyin: Péng Rìchéng), (December 15, 1966 – September 12, 2009) was an American businessman, financier, and fraudster. He ran the Private Equity Management Group, Inc. and Private Equity Management Group, LLC (PEMGroup), which claimed to manage $4 billion. The funds were invested mainly on behalf of Taiwanese investors, in American securities, timeshare properties, and insurance policies. He was arrested by the FBI on April 28, 2009, for structuring cash transactions to avoid a $10,000 reporting threshold, which has a maximum ten-year prison sentence. The U.S. Securities and Exchange Commission in a civil suit alleged that he ran a Ponzi scheme and misreported his background to investors, by claiming that he had been a vice-president at Morgan Stanley and had an MBA degree from the University of California, Irvine. The SEC announced on April 27 that it had obtained a freeze on the assets of Pang and his two firms, as well as an order to turn in his passports. His former partner, Nasar Aboubakare, has also claimed in a lawsuit that the firm was a Ponzi scheme. Pang was confined to his house on bail. His criminal trial had been delayed until August 18, 2010. He died on September 12, 2009, at a Newport Beach, California, hospital.

Details about the Pang's fraudulent life were discussed in the TV series American Greed. In particular, he was featured in the season 5 episode: "The Fraudster, The Ex-Stripper And The Missing Millions".

== Early life and education ==
Pang was born in Taiwan, where he attended the prestigious Lih Jen International Private Elementary and Middle School. He moved to the United States as a teenager, becoming a citizen in 1990. He last lived in Newport Beach and previously lived in Villa Park, also in Orange County. In 1986 he attended the University of California, Irvine, during the summer session. According to Wall Street Journal, he became a student leader at the university, being elected chairman of the Asian Pacific Student & Staff Association in 1988–89, despite not being enrolled at the time.

== Career ==
In 1997, he left a senior position at a venture capital firm, amid accusations of a $3 million theft from an escrow account.

=== PEMGroup ===
About 16,000 Taiwanese investors invested more than $700 million with PEMGroup. The securities were sold to them by Taiwanese banks including Standard Chartered (about $221 million, according to Taiwanese government sources), Hua Nan ($205 million), Bank SinoPac ($146 million), Taichung Bank ($70 million), EnTie Bank ($52 million) and Cosmos Bank ($48 million).

According to the SEC civil suit, PEMGroup offered unregistered securities starting in 2003, promising returns of 5.25% to 7%. The money was supposed to be invested in timeshare properties, and in the purchase of life insurance policies from the elderly. The insurance policies would pay PEMGroup if the covered individuals died. The SEC claims that the returns on the insurance policies were not high enough so that the firm paid with money accepted from new investors, starting a Ponzi scheme. The Wall Street Journal, Pang stepped down from his position as CEO of PEMGroup, pending an internal investigation. The newspaper continued with a series on Pang, which included articles alleging improper accounting of PEMGroup funds, and allegations of improper use of funds to buy Costa Rican real estate.

The firm is now operating under a court-appointed receiver. The receiver reported in a Federal court filing on May 7, 2009, that the firm was used as Pang's "personal piggy-bank" and that investors are currently owed principal of about $823 million, with the firm's assets worth between $213–426 million. Improper use of investor's funds may have included the purchase of several jets, a $1 million Disney cruise for employees, $6.9 million in undocumented loans to Pang, and $9.8 million in transfers to firms controlled by Pang.

In August 2009, the receiver took control of 15 additional entities deemed to be PEMGroup affiliates. These affiliates were controlled by a Taiwanese woman believed to be Pang's girlfriend. U.S. District Judge Philip S. Gutierrez ruled based on photographs that "strongly suggest their relationship transcended that of a normal business relationship."

Pang was confined to his house on $1 million bail in 2009.

== Personal life ==
His first wife, Janie Louise Pang (née Beuschlein), originally worked as a stripper. In 1997 she was murdered in the Villa Park house, possibly by a contract killer, after she took steps toward a divorce. A lawyer who had worked for Danny Pang was arrested for the murder, but his trial resulted in a hung jury. Pang was on a business trip during the murder, and invoked his Fifth Amendment rights to avoid testifying at the trial. At the trial, the defense presented a police and Federal Bureau of Investigation memo suggesting that Pang had ties to Taiwanese organized crime. Pang said he had no ties to his wife's murder or to organized crime ties.

He had a son with his first wife, Danny Pang Jr. He also had a daughter with his second wife Sheanna.

== Death ==
The Wall Street Journal reported that Pang died at a Newport Beach hospital on September 12, 2009. Police reported that they received a report of a dead body near Pang's home at 3:41 pm, on September 11, 2009. Paramedics took him to Hoag Memorial Hospital Presbyterian, where he was in the cardiac care unit. He died at 5:12 the next morning. Police crime scene investigators removed 4 to 5 small bags of evidence from Pang's home, according to neighbors. On the 12th, police stated "We're not sure who made the call. We don't know the cause of death. The coroner will be looking into that as well. This will be treated as a death investigation."

An autopsy conducted on September 13 by the Orange County Coroner ruled out foul play as the cause of death. His death was ruled a suicide in January 2010 based on the toxicology report, which revealed blood levels of both oxycodone and hydrocodone each multiples of the toxic level, as well dozens of undigested pills in his stomach.

His family issued a statement saying "Danny was a wonderful husband, loving father, and honest businessman. For the past five months, Danny was subjected to a relentless attack of innuendo and false allegations, and was denied any opportunity to defend himself."

== See also ==
- List of Ponzi schemes
