= Martin Frankel =

American financial criminal (born 1954)

Martin R. Frankel
- Born: 1954 (age 71–72)
- Other names: James Spencer; David Rosse; Mike King
- Occupation: Money manager
- Parent(s): Leon and Tilly Frankel
- Status: U.S. Bureau of Prisons #14142-014: Fort Dix FCI; Released on: 10/27/2016
- Convictions: Guilty plea, U.S. federal court, 2002: conspiracy, racketeering, securities fraud, wire fraud; also in Tennessee, related charges conspiracy, and wire fraud
- Penalty: 16 years 8 months (federal); 16 years (Tennessee)
- Accomplice: Sonia Schulte (1986–1999)

Martin R. "Marty" Frankel (born 1954) is an American financial criminal who conducted a series of investment frauds in the late 20th century, causing hundreds of millions of dollars in losses. He was caught in 1999, and in 2004 was sentenced to 200 months in prison based on over $200 million in proven losses to insurance companies he bought then looted their actuarial reserves; the sentence was reaffirmed in 2006.

== Personal life ==
Marty Frankel was born to Leon and Tilly Frankel in 1954; he was Leon's fourth child and Tilly's second, and was raised as Jewish. He attended the University of Toledo but never graduated.

== Career ==
Frankel used astrology to make financial trading decisions. In addition, he usually could not bring himself to actually make trades, causing trouble for him with the brokerage firms he worked for. After being fired by his boss John Schulte in 1986, Schulte's wife and brokerage partner, Sonia, left the marriage to join Frankel as his business and life partner. Frankel set up Winthrop Capital using the phony name of James Spencer. He also set up The Frankel Fund with Douglas Maxwell, but remained reluctant to buy or hold his chosen investments.

Frankel moved to Florida in 1987, and attracted Palm Beach investors, but the Frankel Fund lost money on trades, and Frankel was using shareholder accounts to pay expenses, including rent, stock-quote services, and personal spending money for himself, his sister, and his mother. By mid-1988, he was also raiding some investor's accounts to cash out other, worried investors who were pulling out their money. He transferred the remaining funds to his personal account and told his remaining investor that the fund had collapsed due to Maxwell's bad trades and embezzlement. Frankel gave the funds to an attorney, but the funds were then turned over to the Securities and Exchange Commission.

Frankel moved back to Toledo and started a new firm, Creative Partners, while the SEC was investigating him, using the name Rothschild International Investments and a Swiss bank account to separate Creative Partners from his own name and ongoing investigation. By this time, his former boss's wife, Sonia Schulte, was divorcing. Sonia Schulte set up a brokerage in direct competition with her husband's and directed her clients to Creative Partners; meanwhile, Frankel set up another company, Donar Corporation, which paid for Sonia Schulte's new house, and paid Sonia's divorce and custody lawyers over $300,000 out of the Swiss bank account.

After paying a fine and agreeing to be barred from trading by the Securities and Exchange Commission in 1992, Frankel used several aliases, including David Rosse.

In an attempt to use the Roman Catholic Church to discourage questions of legitimacy, Frankel founded the St. Francis of Assisi Foundation in the British Virgin Islands, with a nominal mission of investing in insurance companies in order to fund hospitals. Among people solicited to join the Foundation board was retired CBS Evening News anchorman Walter Cronkite; when he declined to join, his name was used anyway. An official of the Roman Curia, Monsignor Emilio Colagiovanni, agreed to sign a letter falsely stating that the Foundation received funding from the Vatican.

== Arrest and conviction ==
Frankel fled the United States in May 1999. He went by private plane to Rome and then to Hamburg, Germany, where he was arrested on September 4. He was first tried and sentenced in Germany to three years in jail for passport fraud. He was then extradited to the U.S. in 2001.

Monsignor Colagiovanni was arrested in Cleveland, Ohio on August 30, 2001.

In May 2002, Frankel pleaded guilty to 24 federal counts of securities fraud, wire fraud, and related racketeering and conspiracy. Fifteen of Frankel's associates, including Colagiovanni, also pleaded guilty to related crimes; Sonia Schulte pleaded guilty to money laundering and racketeering. By the time Frankel was first sentenced in December 2004, sixteen of his accomplices had been convicted. Frankel told the judge that most of his behavior was to earn enough money to provide for Sonia Schulte (by then Sonia Howe) and her two children; after this, the judge asked "So, you stole $209 million in order to take care of the children?" Frankel then explained that he could not end the scheme without it coming apart, and asked the judge to consider that deterrence should not be a factor in his sentencing because "If somebody is mentally ill, you shouldn't punish them because it won't stop other mentally ill people from doing it." Frankel was sentenced to 200 months (16 years 8 months) in federal prison; a state court in Tennessee also sentenced Frankel to 16 years, which was allowed to run concurrently on the condition that he assist officials in recovering lost assets looted from his Tennessee insurance companies.

Per the Bureau of Prisons Inmate Locator, Frankel (inmate number 14142-014) was released on October 27, 2016, after serving roughly 12 years of his 17-year sentence. Frankel was initially released from prison to a halfway house in Massachusetts in 2015, but was returned to prison for an additional 6 months for violations of the rules at the halfway house. He was then released to a halfway house in Hartford, CT only to once again be ordered to serve 6 more months for violations at that halfway house. He was then released to a reentry facility in Brooklyn.

Several states put Frankel's insurance companies into receivership when it was discovered the companies' primary assets were investments in Frankel's own shell company; among the states affected were Arkansas, Mississippi, Missouri, Oklahoma, Tennessee, and Virginia.

== In popular culture ==
In 2008, the episode "The Martin Frankel Case", of the television series American Greed, covered the fraudulent behavior of Frankel.
