= Joseph Medawar =

American film producer

Joseph Michel Medawar (in Arabic جوزف مدوّر, born November 22, 1961, in Beirut, Lebanon) is a Lebanese American financial strategist and investment-banking counselor specializing in media, entertainment and related industries, film producer, and ex-convict. In 2006, he was sentenced to a year and a day in prison and was ordered to pay $2.6 million in restitution to the defrauded investors.

== Early life ==
Joseph Medawar was born in Beirut in a Christian Lebanese family. He immigrated to the United States in 1975 fleeing the war in Lebanon and settled with his family in Palos Verdes, California.

== Business development ==
Over the past 25 years, Medawar has been responsible for over $500 million in financial transactions. This consisted of acquisitions, mergers, newco's, co-production and production financing, theme parks and events, new film processes as well as biotech and medical industry financing and funding.

== Real estate ==
Mr. Medawar was also Co-chair for ADG in Los Angeles. ADG is responsible for one of the most exclusive residential development projects in the world, Beverly Park. Medawar also led the financial and investment initiatives for the new Travertine, La Quinta Development for ADG near Palm Springs. Additionally, Mr. Medawar co-chaired several large enterprises, whose projects included Universal Studios City Walk Hollywood.

== Motion picture/entertainment career ==
Medawar launched his motion picture career producing the feature film Vendetta (1986) for Concord Entertainment. The same year, Medawar launched First American Film Capital, an independent film production company based in Culver City, California, which produced Hardbodies 2, Pretty Smart and Slaughterhouse Rock.

In 1989 Medawar formed the film development and production company ION Pictures. ION Pictures distributed the documentary Champions Forever and The Closer and produced Sleepwalkers (1992).

In 1995, in collaboration with Prince Albert of Monaco, developed Monaco Entertainment Enterprises (MEE). From 1995 to 1997, MEE primarily focused on regional merger and acquisition investment structuring and consulting, which culminated into financing several motion pictures, events and theme park financing. The company also acted as sponsoring development and chartering for The World Music Awards.

== Legal problems ==
In reality, only a tiny fraction of investor funds were spent by Medawar on anything related to the film production of DHS. In addition, Medawar did not have the endorsement of President Bush or the real Department of Homeland Security (it was found Medawar had been refused permission by the actual Department of Homeland Security to use their name or official seal), had not signed or had prospects of making contracts with any overseas markets, and was never in any position to go public.

The vast majority of investor funds raised, reportedly several million dollars from tens of thousands of investors, were literally diverted to fund Medawar living a lavish lifestyle.

Alison Ann Heruth-Waterbury, who had claimed to be the lead in the television series, pleaded guilty to charges of lying to authorities to conceal an investment scam related to the show. In May 2006, Medawar pleaded guilty to conspiracy to commit mail fraud and income tax evasion for the fake reality TV project.

Medawar later pleaded guilty, was sentenced to a year and a day in prison, ordered to pay $2.6 million in restitution to the defrauded investors and to perform 3,000 hours of community service. The jail sentence was later reduced to probation on appeal, but in 2011, a judge reinstated a sentence of 45 months imprisonment for multiple violations on his probation.

In season 2 of its documentary series American Greed, CNBC broadcast in March 2008 an episode related to the affair. under the title "Inside The WorldCom Scam / DHS: Department of Hollywood Scams".

== Filmography ==
=== Production ===
- 1986: Vendetta (executive producer)
- 1986: Hardbodies 2 (assistant producer)
- 1987: Pretty Smart (executive producer)
- 1988: Slaughterhouse Rock (executive producer)
- 1989: Champions Forever (documentary) (producer)
- 1990: The Closer (producer)
- 1992: Sleepwalkers (executive producer)

=== Acting ===
- 1987: Pretty Smart as The Lebanese
