= Gerald Barnbaum =

American quack and con artist

- Born: 1933; Chicago, Illinois
- Died: June 15, 2018 (aged 84); Rochester, Minnesota
- Other names: Gerald Barnes, Jerold C. Barnes, Jerald C. Barnes, Gerald Charles Barnes
- Occupation: Former pharmacist
- Status: Deceased
- Criminal charges: Fraud, Identity Theft, Manslaughter, Escaping Custody
- Penalty: 12.5 years in federal prison

Gerald Barnbaum (1933 - June 15, 2018), aka "Gerald Barnes", "Jerold C. Barnes", "Jerald C. Barnes" and "Gerald Charles Barnes", was a pharmacist who posed as a medical doctor between 1976 and 2000.

== Biography ==
=== Fraud as doctor and first convictions ===
Born in Chicago, Illinois and originally trained as a pharmacist, Barnbaum had his license revoked in the aftermath of Medicaid fraud charges in 1971. He moved to California in 1976, and after having legally changed his last name to Barnes, stole the identity of a licensed medical doctor in Stockton, Gerald Barnes, and worked as a physician in the Los Angeles and Southern California region for the next three years.

In 1979, his negligence and lack of medical knowledge contributed to the death of John McKenzie, a 29-year-old undiagnosed Type I diabetic from Anaheim who had complained of a dry mouth, chronic thirst, dizziness, and rapid weight loss. Although these were classic signs of uncontrolled diabetes, Barnbaum gave him a drug for vertigo and sent him home. McKenzie's blood test came back a few days later, showing a blood glucose content of 1200 mg/dL (HbA1c > 40%), indicating severe hyperglycemia. When Barnbaum's physician assistant saw the test results, he immediately called police, who found McKenzie dead in his apartment. The PA suspected soon afterward that Barnbaum was an imposter, believing that a real doctor would have never missed such obvious symptoms. The investigation confirmed this, and in 1980 Barnbaum was charged with second-degree murder in McKenzie's death; the charge was plea-bargained down to manslaughter and practicing without a medical license, and he was sentenced to three years and four months jail, serving 19 months before being paroled.

Despite McKenzie's death, after his release from prison and still on parole, Barnbaum continued to practice medicine fraudulently. He briefly served as a referral doctor, but was caught in 1984 when he tried to apply for hospital privileges and the real Dr. Barnes blew the whistle. He was convicted of grand theft and forgery and sentenced to three years and four months jail. The state medical board, however, never flagged the real Dr. Barnes' file. (Note: The actual Dr. Barnes is licensed by the Medical Board of California, License No. A22621.)

His third conviction was in 1989 for stealing the identity of San Francisco pharmacist Donald Barnes; (Note: The actual Donald Barnes, R.Ph., is licensed by the California Board of Pharmacy, License No. 23375.) he was caught when he tried to land a job at a Los Angeles pharmacy using Barnes' license.

Arrested again in early 1991 for parole violations and released in October, the impostor worked for four and a half years in a half-dozen medical facilities in the Los Angeles area. He earned more than $400,000, while the various medical facilities billed insurance companies and individuals approximately $5 million for his services.

In 1995, he obtained a position as staff physician at Executive Health Group, a Los Angeles clinic that handled physical checkups on FBI agents and senior officials with the Federal Reserve Bank. Depending on the source, Barnbaum investigated as few as 70 and as many as several hundred FBI agents in a year. However, he was discovered when a new investigator for the state medical board inherited the Barnes case and questioned him. Under the weight of questioning, Barnbaum first feigned suicidal intent and then faked a heart attack. It later emerged that Barnbaum had misdiagnosed several patients and dispensed improper medications, in some cases resulting in patients losing their jobs.

=== Plea deal, escape, and incarceration ===
Federal authorities joined the investigation, since Barnbaum had defrauded federal employees. Facing the possibility of spending the rest of his life in federal prison, Barnbaum pleaded guilty to mail fraud, unlawful dispensing of controlled substances and fraudulent use of a controlled substances registration. He was sentenced to 12.5 years in prison. Executive Health was later sued for battery, sexual battery and medical malpractice during Barnbaum's tenure there; the company agreed to pay $9.2 million in damages to almost 500 plaintiffs.

During a transfer to another prison in 2000, Barnbaum escaped while on a transfer furlough from a prison in California to another minimum security prison in Minnesota. He was captured by the US Marshals Service four weeks later while working in yet another medical clinic. He was sentenced to an additional six months in prison for escaping custody, to be served consecutively with his original sentence. Barnbaum served his sentence at the FMC Rochester in Rochester, Minnesota, where he died on June 15, 2018. The real Dr. Barnes spent several years repairing his credit and his reputation as a result of Barnbaum's fraudulent activities.

Barnbaum's case was profiled on the TV series Masterminds, in 2007 on American Greed, in the second episode of the first season., and in 2013 on Who the (Bleep)... Season 1, Episode 11 “Bad Medicine.”

=== Death ===
Gerald Barnbaum died in prison on June 15, 2018, according to information available online from the Federal Bureau of Prisons. He was 85.

== Further information ==
- Inmate information from United States Bureau of Prisons
- John Carlova. "A Loaded Gun Waiting to Go Off." Medical Economics, 1/21/1985.
- Elizabeth Fernandez. Bizarre Medical Masquerade: Determined con man steals Stockton doctor's identity for 20 years. San Francisco Chronicle, 2/18/2001.
- John Mesirow. Talk About The Long Con. LegalJuice.com, 6/29/2007.
- Noble, Kenneth B. (April 17, 1996). "Doctor's Specialty Turns Out to Be Masquerade". The New York Times.
- American Greed, CNBC (2007). "The Impostor: Dr. Barnes / Interstate Bank Mart Bandit" Season 1. episode 2 (original air date June 28, 2007). Viewed July 12, 2020.
