= Murder of Abraham Shakespeare =

American lottery winner and murder victim (1966–2009)

Abraham Lee Shakespeare
- Born: April 24, 1966; Lakeland, Florida, U.S.
- Died: c. April 7, 2009 (aged 42); Plant City, Florida, U.S.
- Cause of death: Homicide
- Body discovered: January 26, 2010
- Occupation: Truck driver's assistant
- Known for: Florida Lottery winner and murder victim

Abraham Lee Shakespeare (April 24, 1966 – c. April 7, 2009) was a Florida Lottery winner who won a $30 million lottery jackpot, receiving $17 million in 2006. In 2009, his family declared him missing, and in January 2010 his body was found buried under a concrete slab in the backyard of an acquaintance. Dorice "Dee Dee" Moore was convicted of his murder and is now serving life in prison without the possibility of parole.

== Lottery win ==
The Florida Lotto winning ticket worth thirty million dollars was sold at a Town Star convenience store in Frostproof, Florida, on November 15, 2006. On that day, Abraham Lee Shakespeare and co-worker Michael Ford were headed toward Miami when they stopped briefly at the convenience store in Frostproof to buy drinks and cigarettes. Ford exited the truck and asked Shakespeare if he wanted a soda. Shakespeare instead asked Ford to buy him two lottery tickets. Shakespeare said that he paid Ford $2 for the tickets out of the $5 he had on him that day.

Ford later approached Shakespeare demanding a share of the jackpot of no less than $1 million, which Shakespeare refused to pay, prompting Ford to sue Shakespeare and alleging that Shakespeare stole lottery tickets out of Ford's wallet. The jury did not believe Ford's stolen lottery tickets story and Shakespeare prevailed in the courts. Shakespeare had chosen a one-time lump sum cash payment of $17 million. He moved out of his working-class neighborhood in Lakeland, Florida, and into a gated community. Several months after his lottery win, apart from a $1 million home, his only other major purchases included a Nissan Altima and a Rolex watch from a pawnshop. By late January 2010 the sheriff involved in the investigation of Shakespeare's disappearance told the AP that the lottery money "is gone now."

Friends stated Shakespeare had grown frustrated with the constant appeals for money from both hangers-on and strangers. He told his brother, "I'd have been better off broke," and told a childhood friend, "I thought all these people were my friends, but then I realized all they want is just money." One of them was Dorice Donegan "Dee Dee" Moore, who launched a business with Shakespeare, Abraham Shakespeare LLC, giving herself control of the firm's funds. Moore subsequently withdrew $1 million and bought herself a Hummer, a Chevrolet Corvette, and a truck before going on vacation. She later claimed that the money was a gift from Shakespeare.

== Missing status and death ==
On November 9, 2009, Shakespeare's family reported him missing, stating that they had not seen him since April of that year. Family and friends had originally hoped he had taken his money and was living on a beach in the Caribbean Sea. A tip-off led investigators to the backyard of a single-story ranch home in Plant City purchased by Dorice Donegan "Dee Dee" Moore (born July 25, 1972), the prime suspect in the disappearance of Abraham Shakespeare. His body was found buried under 9 feet (2.7 m) of dirt under a newly constructed concrete slab. Hillsborough County detectives say Shakespeare died April 6 or 7 in the Plant City home. Shakespeare was 42.

== Investigation ==
During the investigation into Shakespeare's disappearance, police spoke with Moore on several occasions, as she claimed to still be in contact with him. Moore had befriended Shakespeare, ostensibly to write a book about his experiences. Moore claimed that, over time, she began providing him financial advice and helping him with financial concerns.

Moore said Shakespeare had decided to leave town and had gone to Texas, Jamaica, Puerto Rico, or Orlando, Florida, or was sick in a hospital. Moore also said that Shakespeare was tired of people asking him for money, so she helped him leave town. However, during this same time, she tried to find a person who would take the blame for Shakespeare's death for $50,000. She also offered to pay someone to dig up and move Shakespeare's body to another location.

After police found his body under a concrete slab in the backyard of the home she put in her boyfriend's name, Moore told police different versions of what happened to Shakespeare, blaming drug dealers, a lawyer, and her 14-year-old son. She later said she killed Shakespeare in self-defense.

The investigation revealed the variety of ways Moore attempted to convince Shakespeare was alive while continuing to have access to his money and property. After Shakespeare's disappearance, Moore, who was living in his house, kept using his cell phone and sending text messages to his friends and relatives, pretending she was Shakespeare. Recipients thought they did not sound like him and were suspicious because Shakespeare was illiterate. When people texted Shakespeare's phone back with questions that could not be answered by Moore, no response was given. Moore also offered the mother of one of Shakespeare's two sons a $200,000 home if she would lie to detectives and tell them she had seen him recently and paid $5,000 to a relative of Shakespeare's to give his mother a birthday card and imply it was from him.

Property records showed that Moore's company, American Medical Professionals, bought Shakespeare's house. Moore told investigators she paid Shakespeare $655,000 for his home and paid $185,000 for outstanding loans (which were actually worth much more) to others; however, there is no evidence showing she paid Shakespeare anything.

As Moore became a person of interest, police learned she had a history of fraud; in 2001, Moore was convicted of insurance fraud and falsely reporting a crime. She had staged a scene to fraudulently keep a vehicle which was in danger of being repossessed after falling behind on the payments. She had someone store the car in a garage and then pretended she was kidnapped, sexually assaulted and carjacked. Investigators claimed she taped her own wrists and threw herself from someone else's car. She even took a rape exam. She later pleaded no contest to the charge and received probation.

Police took Moore into custody on February 2, 2010, in connection with the murder of Shakespeare. A judge set a $1 million bond. The police stated Moore had tried to convince an acquaintance to unearth the body and move it a week after the death, and had continued to try to convince others that Shakespeare was still alive. On February 19, 2010, Moore was formally charged with first-degree murder.

== Conviction of Moore ==
On December 10, 2012, Moore was convicted of first degree murder for the killing of Shakespeare and was sentenced to life in prison without the possibility of parole, with an additional minimum sentence of 25 years for possessing a gun in the course of a violent felony.

== In media ==
The difficulties Shakespeare experienced as a result of winning the lottery and his subsequent murder were the focus of the American E! television program Curse of the Lottery, part of an episode of Lottery Changed My Life, and a 2013 episode of American Greed.

A July 2013 episode of Deadly Women also profiled the case, focusing on Dorice Moore's role in his murder. A September 2013 episode of Snapped focused on Moore's murder trial. Moore was also featured in a 2011 episode of the television show Lockup while in the Hillsborough County Jail in Tampa, Florida awaiting her trial. She stated that she planned on selling the rights to her story to pay $200,000 to a lawyer who could get her out. Moore denied all charges.

In 2017, Moore was interviewed in part 2 of Women Who Kill, a documentary about women serving time for murder. She continued to maintain her innocence despite the evidence against her.

In 2023, the story of Shakespeare's murder and Moore's arrest was the subject of the first episode of Hulu's Web of Death series, as well as Lakeland Lotto Mystery, the final episode in season 1 of Floribama Murders. In 2024, his case and trial were also explored on Peacock's Buried in the Backyard. In 2025, 20/20 explored his case and trial in an episode titled "Unlucky Numbers".

Shakespeare's murder was covered by MrBallen on the MrBallen Podcast: Strange, Dark & Mysterious Stories podcast episode entitled "Jackpot".

== Timeline ==
- November 15, 2006 – Shakespeare's co-worker Michael Ford buys two tickets (including the winning ticket) at Shakespeare's request.
- January 2007 – Shakespeare buys a $1.1 million home in a gated community in North Lakeland.
- April 2007 – Michael Ford sues Shakespeare for allegedly stealing the winning ticket from him.
- October 19, 2007 – A jury takes only a little over an hour to rule that Shakespeare did not steal the winning ticket from Michael Ford's wallet.
- October 2008 – Dee Dee Moore arranges to meet Shakespeare, purportedly to write a book about him.
- January 9, 2009 – The ownership of Shakespeare's home is transferred to American Medical Professionals, Moore's company.
- 2009 – According to Polk County records, Shakespeare's home and other properties are sold or assigned to American Medical Professionals. Of $570,000 owed to Shakespeare, more than two-thirds is owed by American Medical Professionals.
- February 21, 2009 – Moore buys a 2008 Chevrolet Corvette for her boyfriend for $70,390.86. She pays with a cashier's check from her American Medical Professionals LLC business account.
- March 2, 2009 – Moore buys a 2009 Hummer for about $90,000.
- April 2009 – Shakespeare is last seen in the Lakeland area of Florida.
- April 6, 2009 – According to detectives, this is the last day Shakespeare used his cell phone.
- April 2009 – Dee Dee Moore calls James Moore, her ex-husband, asking him (according to his later statement to police) to dig a hole in her yard. Dee Dee claims the hole is needed to bury concrete and trash. James Moore digs a hole and is called back two hours later to fill the hole. James Moore, who was being paid to do other yard work by Dee Dee, claims he filled the hole, but could not see what was in it, as it was dark.
- August 2009 – Cedric Edom, Shakespeare's cousin, delivers a card with $100 and a cross enclosed to Elizabeth Walker, Shakespeare's mother. Walker claimed the signature on the card looked like Shakespeare's, but that Edom did not say who gave him the card.
- November 9, 2009 – Cedric Edom files a missing person's report on Shakespeare with the sheriff's office.
- November 12, 2009 – In possibly the first police interview conducted with Dee Dee Moore, detectives try to learn how Moore appropriated Shakespeare's assets. Moore tells investigators she paid Shakespeare in cash.
- November 24, 2009 – In another interview with detectives, Moore claims the reason Shakespeare was taken off the Abraham Shakespeare LLC account was that he did not want to pay taxes. She also cannot give a reason for why the approximately $1 million used to open the account was withdrawn days after Shakespeare's name was removed.
- November 24, 2009 – The Polk County sheriff's office declares Shakespeare missing.
- December 3, 2009 – In an interview with detectives, Moore claims that the reason that some of Shakespeare's assets went into Moore's business account, American Medical Associates, was because Shakespeare did not want to pay child support.
- December 2009 – Moore, posing as Shakespeare, writes to his mother saying he is fine, even though Shakespeare could not read or write.
- December 5, 2009 – Moore sells her 10-month-old Hummer to a friend of an owner of a Chevrolet dealer for $49,000.
- December 27, 2009 – Elizabeth Walker, Shakespeare's mother, receives a phone call from someone pretending to be Shakespeare, while she eats out with Dee Dee Moore.
- December 28, 2009 – Gregory Smith, one of Shakespeare's friends, is paid by Moore to make calls to Shakespeare's mother pretending to be her son. Smith is approached and interviewed by detectives and decides to start cooperating with law enforcement.
- January 2010 – Moore contacts Gregory Smith and asks him if he knew anyone who would be willing to admit to law enforcement that they were responsible for the killing of Shakespeare.
- January 21, 2010 – Officer Mike Smith of the Lake Wales, Florida police department, working undercover, is introduced to Dee Dee Moore by Gregory Smith. Moore agrees to pay Smith $50,000 if he claims responsibility for Shakespeare's death. Smith agrees, but he tells Moore he needs to know where Shakespeare is buried.
- January 25, 2010 – Dee Dee Moore shows Gregory Smith the concrete slab under which Shakespeare is buried. Moore also gives Gregory Smith the .38 Smith & Wesson revolver which was used to kill Shakespeare.
- January 25, 2010 – In an interview with detectives, Moore claims the reason she did not pay Shakespeare for his house was because he had a drug problem and the money would be used to buy drugs.
- January 27, 2010 – Police find a body at the Plant City house on the second day of digging at the site.
- January 28, 2010 – James Moore, Dee Dee Moore's ex-husband is interviewed by detectives and makes the claim about digging and filling a hole in April.
- January 29, 2010 – The body found at the Plant City property is identified as that of the missing Shakespeare.
- February 2, 2010 – Police take Dee Dee Moore into custody. Moore is charged with accessory after the fact.
- February 3, 2010 – The judge sets bond at $1 million for Dorice "Dee Dee" Moore.
- February 19, 2010 – Dee Dee Moore is charged with first-degree murder.
- March 15, 2010 – Dee Dee Moore pleads not guilty to murder in a Hillsborough County, Florida, court.
- December 10, 2012 – Dee Dee Moore is found guilty of murder, and she is sentenced to life in prison without parole.

== See also ==
- List of solved missing person cases (2000s)
