= Sky Capital fraud case =

Investment and securities fraud, 1998–2006

The Sky Capital Fraud Case was a significant securities fraud prosecution in New York's history involving Ross Mandell, the founder of Sky Capital Holdings Ltd., and Adam Harrington, a former broker at the company. The two men were accused and successfully convicted of defrauding investors out of $140 million over an eight-year period by using high-pressure sales tactics and false promises of high investment returns.

== Background ==
Between 1998 and 2006, Ross Mandell and Adam Harrington (also known as Adam Rukdeschel and Adam Harrington Ruckdeschel) operated a fraudulent scheme that lured investors with false promises of high returns from purported private placements and other securities. Mandell and Harrington convinced investors to invest in purported private placements, restricted stock sales, and other investment vehicles. However, the investments were actually worthless, and the money was used to fund Mandell and Harrington's lavish lifestyle.

== The fraud ==
Mandell and Harrington deceived investors about the actual value of their investments, using the money to finance their lavish lifestyles. Both made frequent trips to London where they specifically targeted British retail investors.

The Sky Capital fraud case involved a complex scheme to defraud investors out of $140 million. The scheme was orchestrated by Ross Mandell, the founder of Sky Capital Holdings Ltd., and Adam Harrington, a former Sky Capital broker. This included making false promises of returns as high as 20%, misrepresenting the risks, and using high-pressure sales tactics.

Mandell and Harrington convinced investors to invest in purported private placements, restricted stock sales, and other investment vehicles. However, the investments were actually worthless. The money was used to fund Mandell and Harrington's lavish lifestyle, including expensive cars, homes, and vacations.

Mandell and Harrington used a variety of methods to defraud investors. They made false promises of high investment returns, they misrepresented the risks of the investments, and they concealed the fact that the investments were actually worthless.

For example, Mandell and Harrington would tell investors that they could expect to earn annual returns of 20% or more on their investments. They would also tell investors that the investments were low-risk, even though they were actually very risky. And they would conceal the fact that the investments were actually worthless by creating fake financial statements and misleading investors about the underlying assets.

In addition to making false promises and misrepresenting the risks, Mandell and Harrington also used high-pressure sales tactics to pressure investors into investing. They would often tell investors that they were missing out on a once-in-a-lifetime opportunity, and they would use scare tactics to pressure investors into making a decision quickly.

For example, Mandell and Harrington would tell investors that the investments were only available for a limited time, or that the prices were going to go up soon. They would also tell investors that if they didn't invest now, they would miss out on the opportunity to make a lot of money.

The fraud was eventually uncovered by the Securities and Exchange Commission (SEC). In 2009, Mandell and Harrington were indicted on charges of conspiracy, securities fraud, wire fraud, and mail fraud. They were tried in federal court in Manhattan, and in 2011, they were both found guilty.

=== Types of Investments ===
The duo sold several unregistered securities, including:

- Private placements
- Restricted stock sales
- Structured notes
- Collateralized debt obligations
- Mortgage-backed securities

These investments were all unregistered securities, which means that they were not subject to the same level of regulation as publicly traded securities and had fewer regulations. This made it easier for Mandell and Harrington to perpetrate the fraud, as they were not required to disclose the risks of the investments.

Mandell and Harrington used a variety of high-pressure sales tactics to pressure investors into investing. These tactics included:

- Telling investors that they were missing out on a once-in-a-lifetime opportunity
- Using scare tactics to pressure investors into making a decision quickly
- Promising investors high returns with little or no risk
- Creating a sense of urgency by telling investors that the investments were only available for a limited time
- Discouraging investors from selling their shares

=== Promises about returns and risks ===
Mandell and Harrington made a variety of promises to investors about the returns and risks of the investments. These promises included:

- Promising investors that they could expect to earn annual returns of 20% or more
- Telling investors that the investments were low-risk
- Misleading investors about the underlying assets

In reality, the investments were actually worthless. Mandell and Harrington knew this, but they concealed the fact from investors.

=== Evidence used by the SEC ===
The SEC used a variety of evidence to build its case against Mandell and Harrington. This evidence included:

- Financial statements that were falsified
- Emails and text messages that showed that Mandell and Harrington were aware that the investments were worthless
- Testimony from investors who had been defrauded

The SEC also used wiretaps to record Mandell and Harrington making false promises to investors. These recordings were key evidence in the case, as they showed that Mandell and Harrington were deliberately defrauding investors.

== Investigation and prosecution ==
The investigation into the Sky Capital fraud case began in 2006, after the SEC received a tip from an investor who had been defrauded by Mandell and Harrington. The SEC's investigation revealed that Mandell and Harrington had been using a variety of methods to defraud investors, including making false promises of high investment returns, misrepresenting the risks of the investments, and concealing the fact that the investments were actually worthless.

In 2009, the SEC filed a civil complaint against Mandell and Harrington, alleging that they had committed securities fraud. The complaint also named Sky Capital Holdings Ltd. as a defendant. By 2009, Mandell, Harrington, and Sky Capital Holdings Ltd. faced both civil and criminal charges.

In 2010, the SEC filed a criminal complaint against Mandell and Harrington, alleging that they had committed conspiracy, securities fraud, wire fraud, and mail fraud. The criminal complaint also named Sky Capital Holdings Ltd. as a defendant.

Ross Mandell proclaimed innocence and played blame on "rogue brokers" such as Adam Harrington, for cheating their clients.

Mandell and Harrington were tried in federal court in Manhattan in 2011. The trial lasted for six weeks, and at the end of the trial, the jury found Mandell and Harrington guilty on all counts.

Mandell was sentenced to 12 years in prison, and Harrington was sentenced to five years in prison. Sky Capital Holdings Ltd. was also ordered to pay $140 million in restitution to the victims of the fraud.

The investigation and prosecution of the Sky Capital fraud case was a major victory for the SEC and the Department of Justice.

== Convictions ==
Ross Mandell and Adam Harrington were both convicted of securities fraud, wire fraud, and mail fraud in 2011. They were tried in federal court in Manhattan, and the jury found them guilty, on all counts. The trial lasted 5 weeks. The convictions of Mandell and Harrington were a major victory for the SEC and the Department of Justice. The case sent a strong message to those who would commit securities fraud that they would be held accountable for their crimes.

In addition to the criminal convictions, Mandell and Harrington were also sued by civil plaintiffs. In 2012, a federal judge ordered Mandell and Harrington to pay $140 million in damages to the victims of the fraud.

== Aftermath ==
The case had a profound impact on securities regulations, leading to stricter rules and an aggressive stance against securities fraud by the SEC and the Department of Justice. The case led to the passage of new regulations designed to protect investors from fraud. In addition, the case had a significant impact on the victims of the fraud. Many of the victims lost their life savings, and they struggled to recover from the financial losses. Some of the victims also suffered from emotional trauma, as they had been betrayed by someone they trusted.

The Sky Capital fraud case is a reminder that securities fraud is a serious crime that can have devastating consequences for investors. It is important for investors to be aware of the risks of investing in unregistered securities, and to be wary of high-pressure sales tactics and false promises of high investment returns.

=== The victims ===
The Sky Capital fraud case had a significant impact on the victims of the fraud. Many of the victims lost their life savings, and they struggled to recover from the financial losses. Some of the victims also suffered from emotional trauma, as they had been betrayed by someone they trusted.

The victims of the fraud were a diverse group, but about 400 British retail investors were conned.

Some of the victims were attracted by the high-pressure sales tactics used by Sky Capital brokers. Others were attracted by the promises of high investment returns. And still others were attracted by the fact that Sky Capital was a well-known and respected company.

In addition to the financial losses, the victims of the fraud also suffered from emotional trauma. They felt betrayed by Sky Capital, and they felt angry and frustrated by the fact that they had been defrauded. Some of the victims also suffered from anxiety and depression.

The SEC and the Department of Justice have taken steps to help the victims of the Sky Capital fraud recover their losses. However, the victims have had difficulty recovering their losses, and many of them are still struggling financially.

=== In popular media ===
The American Greed episode "The Sky's the Limit" tells the story of the Sky Capital fraud case, which resulted in the conviction of Ross Mandell and Adam Harrington for securities fraud.
