= McStay family murders =

2010 mass murder in Fallbrook, California

- Missing persons flier for the McStay family
- Location: Fallbrook, California, U.S.
- Date: c. February 4, 2010; 16 years ago
- Attack type: Mass murder by bludgeoning, torture murder, child murder, disappearance
- Weapon: Sledgehammer
- Deaths: 4
- Perpetrator: Charles "Chase" Ray Merritt
- Motive: Unknown
- Verdict: Guilty on all counts
- Convictions: First-degree murder with special circumstances (4 counts): Second-degree murder (4 counts; lesser included offenses)
- Sentence: Death

The McStay family murders occurred on or near February 4, 2010, after the family disappeared from their home in Fallbrook, California, United States; their bodies were found approximately 100 miles away in the desert near Victorville, California, on November 13, 2013. Their disappearance was widely reported by the national news media.

On November 7, 2014, police announced they had arrested Charles "Chase" Merritt, Joseph McStay's business partner, and intended to charge him with the murders. The trial began on January 7, 2019, in San Bernardino. On June 10, 2019, a jury found Merritt guilty of murdering the McStay family. He was sentenced to death on January 21, 2020.

== Background ==
In 2010, Joseph McStay (age 40) and his wife Summer (age 43) lived in Fallbrook, California, with their sons Gianni (age 4) and Joseph Jr. (age 3). Joseph owned and operated Earth Inspired Products, a company that built decorative fountains, and Summer was a licensed real estate agent. Summer was born Virginia Lisa Aranda, and had also been known as Summer Martelli.

== Disappearance and search ==
On February 4, 2010, at 7:47 pm, a neighbor's surveillance system captured the bottom eighteen inches of a vehicle, thought at the time to be the McStay family's 1996 Isuzu Trooper. In the surveillance recording, the vehicle's occupants could not be seen. At 8:28 pm, a call was placed from Joseph's cell phone to his business associate, Charles "Chase" Merritt, which went to voicemail. Merritt later told police that he ignored the voicemail because he was watching a movie. Joseph's cellphone pinged a tower in Fallbrook.

Over the next several days, relatives of the McStays unsuccessfully tried to contact the family. On February 13, Joseph's brother Michael traveled to the McStay residence where he climbed through an open window in the back and gained entry to the home. Michael did not find any family at home, and their two dogs were in the backyard. On February 15, Michael phoned the San Diego County Sheriff's Department and reported that his brother and his family were missing. Officers arrived at the home and requested a search warrant, executed on February 19, 2010. Although a search of the house found no evidence of a struggle or foul play, there were indications of a hasty departure: a carton of eggs had been left on the counter, and two child-size bowls of popcorn sat on a sofa.

During their investigation, the police learned that around 11:00 pm on February 8, the family's Trooper had been towed from a strip mall parking lot in San Ysidro, San Diego, near the Mexican border. It was believed to have been parked there between 5:30 and 7:00 that evening. The car's location from February 4 to February 8 remains unknown.

== Discovery of remains ==
On November 11, 2013, a motorcyclist found four sets of human remains buried in two shallow graves in the desert near Victorville, California. Patrick McStay, Joseph's father, was informed of the discovery and phoned missing person advocate Jerrie Dean to tell her what he knew.

Dean stated in her blog she had just finished producing a radio show for San Diego station KNSJ when she received the call, and that she asked whether she could tell her followers what he had told her. Two days later, two sets of remains were officially identified as those of Joseph and Summer McStay. The deaths were ruled a homicide and San Bernardino County authorities said they believed the family died of blunt force trauma inside their home, but declined to discuss specifics of the deaths or a motive.

== Investigation and speculation ==
The circumstances surrounding the family's disappearance and the lack of clues about their whereabouts triggered speculation by amateur sleuths. Radio host Rick Baker published a book, No Goodbyes: The Mysterious Disappearance of the McStay Family. Baker began following the case in 2013 after interviewing Michael McStay on his program. He conducted dozens of interviews on the case (traveling to Mexico, Belize, Haiti, and the Dominican Republic), followed leads, and reported sightings of the family. In the book, he speculated that Summer might have committed the murders. When the bodies were found, he offered a refund to those who purchased his book before November 2013.

After their disappearance, it was speculated that the McStays left voluntarily since investigators found searches on the family's computers for "What documents do children need for traveling to Mexico?" and Spanish language lessons. Because their car was found so close to the Mexican border, police reviewed surveillance footage of the pedestrian gate into Mexico. Video recorded the evening of February 8, released on March 5, showed a family of four resembling the McStays crossing the border. On February 19, California police notified Interpol to be on the lookout for the family. In April 2013, the San Diego Sheriff's Department announced that they believed that the McStays traveled to Mexico voluntarily.

Unconfirmed family sightings were reported in Mexico and elsewhere, perpetuating hopes that they were safe and had left voluntarily. Relatives of the McStays doubted that they would travel to Mexico, saying that Joseph and Summer avoided the country because of the safety threat posed by recent drug wars. Other critics of the theory noted that the McStays had more than $100,000 in bank accounts, with no withdrawal of funds in preparation for a trip, and their accounts were untouched after their disappearance. Summer's sister stated that her passport was expired.

Investigators and the public also focused on Merritt, the last known person to have had contact with Joseph and the first to notice his disappearance. According to state records, Merritt had felony convictions for burglary and receiving stolen property. His most recent felony conviction, in 2001, was for the theft of $32,000 worth of welding and drilling equipment from San Gabriel Valley Ornamental Iron Works in Monrovia, California. An acquaintance of Merritt's told a San Diego reporter, "I think police should look at him and anyone associated with him."

In 2013, Merritt acknowledged he had spent more than an hour with Joseph the day the McStay family went missing. Merritt, who reportedly was the last person Joseph called from his cell phone, also said that he had passed a polygraph test and did not know anything that could help solve the mystery of the family's disappearance. When asked if he thought Merritt was a suspect, Joseph's father Patrick said, "I have to have faith in Chase because I have to have faith in my son. I believe that [Joseph] trusted Chase and believed in Chase. Do I think Chase is involved? I don't think so, and I truly hope not."

In January 2014, Merritt said that he might write a book about the family, alleging that Summer had anger issues and that Joseph had been ill for some time with a mysterious ailment. Joseph's family confirmed that he had an unexplained illness and that Summer was possessive of her husband, but they called Merritt's suggestion that she was responsible for his illness unfounded. Patrick said, "I truly believe she loved my son."

== Arrest and trial ==
On November 5, 2014, detectives from the San Bernardino County Sheriff's Department arrested Merritt in connection with the deaths of the McStay family after discovering that his DNA had been recovered from their car. His arrest was announced on November 7, 2014. Merritt was charged with four counts of murder, and the district attorney sought the death penalty. In July 2015, Merritt's defense attorney filed a request to have the case dismissed because of the wording used by the prosecution when the charges were filed.

According to the arrest warrant affidavits filed in the case, autopsies concluded that all four victims had been beaten to death with a blunt object. Investigators believed the murder weapon was a 3-pound sledgehammer, which was found in the grave containing the remains of Summer and her son. Investigators testified they believed the victims were tortured before they were killed.

Prosecutors allege that Merritt had a gambling problem and killed the McStay family for financial gain. They said that he wrote checks totaling more than $21,000 on Joseph's business account in the days after the family was killed and then went on a gambling spree at nearby casinos, where he lost thousands of dollars. Merritt's trial was delayed as he had repeatedly fired his attorneys or attempted to represent himself. By February 2016, he had gone through five attorneys.

In January 2018, a trial-setting conference was scheduled for February 23. Merritt's attorney filed a motion in San Bernardino Superior Court on April 7, 2018, arguing that Joseph's business and accounting records were hearsay evidence and therefore inadmissible. On May 4, the case was scheduled to go to trial in July 2018. The trial finally began on January 7, 2019, in a San Bernardino court, with both sides making opening statements.

On June 10, 2019, a San Bernardino County jury found Merritt guilty of murdering the McStay family. On June 24, the jury recommended that Merritt be sentenced to death.

The court upheld the jury's recommendation, and Merritt was sentenced to death on January 21, 2020. The state of California has had a moratorium on the death penalty since 2019. Merritt is incarcerated at the Richard J. Donovan Correctional Facility in San Diego and is not eligible for parole.

== Popular media ==
The case was featured on a 2021 episode of American Greed. On May 22, 2022, the case was looked at again on the Investigation Discovery docuseries Two Shallow Graves. The show features new suspects, witnesses, evidence, and theories regarding the case, as well as the trial from both the defendant's and prosecutor's points of view. On October 3, 2025, the case was featured in the 20/20 news story "What Happened to the McStays?".

== See also ==
- Capital punishment in California
- Crime in California
- List of solved missing person cases (post-2000)
- List of murdered American children
- List of death row inmates in the United States § California
