= Tran Organization =

- Founded: August 2002; 23 years ago
- Founded by: Van Thu Tran, Phuong Quoc "Pai Gao John" Truong, Tai Khiem Tran
- Founding location: San Diego, California, United States
- Years active: 2002–2012
- Territory: United States, Canada
- Criminal activities: Casino cheating, racketeering, money laundering
- Notable members: Van Thu Tran, Phuong Quoc Truong, Tai Khiem Tran

The Tran Organization was a criminal network of casino cheats in the 2000s. The group targeted at least 28 casinos across the United States and one in Canada. The casinos lost around $7,000,000 to the organization. As of 2011, 47 people were indicted, of which 42 had already pleaded guilty in relation to the conspiracy.

== History ==
=== Gambling scheme ===
The criminal enterprise began around August 2002 in San Diego, California, and included Van Thu Tran, her husband Phuong Quoc "Pai Gao John" Truong, and Tai Khiem Tran, with several other Tran family members also involved.

The organizers had themselves been card dealers. They bribed card dealers and casino supervisors to do false shuffles to create "slugs" of cards with already-seen sequences. The system worked especially well with mini-baccarat, in which players are allowed to track cards openly. They later expanded to blackjack, in which the betting limits are higher but card counting is forbidden at most casinos; the group hid wireless microphones and earpieces on themselves to communicate with conspirators using computer programs to predict which cards would re-appear.

Casinos often did not realize they were being cheated until after the gang had already left town. Some casinos, suspecting they were being cheated in an unknown way, called on government authorities.

=== Investigation and arrests ===
The FBI opened a case file in 2004. After Phuong Truong started shortchanging the colluding dealers out of their portion of the illegal money, some dealers became informants for the FBI. In June 2006, Mississippi Gaming Commission agents posed as corrupt dealers and secretly videotaped a meeting with Truong, in which he bragged openly about the scheme and its success.

The conspirators were rounded up in 2007. By 2007, Truong and 46 confederates were indicted for racketeering, theft and money laundering. Truong pleaded guilty and received 70 months (5 years and 10 months) in prison.

Tai Khiem Tran pleaded guilty to conspiracy and racketeering in 2009, but Van Thu Tran pleaded not guilty to those charges. Van Thu Tran instead pleaded guilty in January 2011, and was ordered to pay $5.7 million in restitution payable to several casinos. On September 28, 2012, Van Thu Tran was sentenced in San Diego to 36 months in prison for her role in the scheme, with three years of supervised release. At that point, 42 defendants had pleaded guilty to charges relating to the cheating conspiracy, admitting overall to targeting a combined total of 29 US and Canada casinos.
