= Elemetal =

American corporation specialising in gold

Elemetal is a Dallas, Texas-based corporation with many subsidiaries which smelt, refine and trade gold.

== History ==
The company was founded in 1974 by Walter Luhrman as a precious metals refinery in Jackson, Ohio under Jackson Precious Metals. It would run into financial difficulties in the 1990s and sold to Alan Stockmeister, a Jackson native who owned many local area businesses, including the local newspaper. Stockmeister would rename the precious metals refinery, Ohio Precious Metals. Stockmeister said success would not be defined in terms of dollars and profits, but in terms of creating jobs for the Appalachia Ohio region.

In April 2012, Ohio Precious Metals LLC ("OPM") entered into an agreement with NTR Metals to acquire the assets and use of the name NTR Metals. In 2015, Bill LeRoy, the president of Ohio Precious Metals, was named the company's CEO and the company changed its name to "Elemetal".

In March 2017, Juan P. Granda (a former employee of NTR Metals Miami) was charged with buying gold from illegal mines in Peru. In January 2018, Samer H. Barrage, Renato J. Rodriguez, and Juan P. Granda, three former employees of the now-defunct Florida-based NTR Metals, were jailed for six years after they pleaded guilty to money-laundering. Elemetal was not charged in the case against the three rogue gold traders.

In March 2018, Elemetal pleaded guilty in the Southern District of Florida to "failure to maintain an adequate anti-money laundering program", a violation of the Bank Secrecy Act. Elemetal was fined $15 million.

In April 2019, Republic Metals Corporation "executed a non-prosecution agreement" with the USDA in the ongoing Operation Arch Stanton investigation, which had ensnared the three former employees of the now-defunct NTR Metals Miami.

== Subsidiaries ==
- NTR Metals Miami LLC
- Elemetal Direct LLC, an online bullion dealer
- Elemetal Capital, a market maker in bullion
- Elemetal Recycling
- Elemetal Refining LLC, an Ohio-based good delivery merchant
