= Solomon Dwek =

Israeli-American real estate investor and fraudster

- Born: c. 1973 (age 52–53)
- Spouse: Pearl Dwek
- Children: 6 Children. Born c. 1996, 1998, 2000, 2003, 2006, and 2011.
- Parent(s): Rabbi Isaac Dwek, Raizel Dwek
- Status: Sentenced to concurrent terms of six years (Federal) and four years (State)
- Convictions: Pled guilty: Bank fraud (Federal), misconduct by a corporate official (State)

Solomon Dwek (also known by his Hebrew name Shlomo שלמה; born c. 1973) is an Israeli-American real estate investor who was convicted of felony fraud. He became an FBI informant.

== Personal profile ==
Born to a Sephardic Syrian Jewish family and a resident of Deal Park, a neighborhood in Ocean Township, New Jersey, Dwek ran a real estate empire in and around Monmouth County under multiple business names, and was nominally vice-president of the Deal Yeshiva, a non-profit Orthodox Jewish religious school which his parents founded. He was allegedly paid at least $200,000 annually, and possibly up to $500,000, while his wife was paid $100,000 as a Secretary, although neither seemed to have any role in the school. The investors defrauded by Dwek were also members of the local Syrian Jewish community. Dwek was well respected and trusted due to the reputation of his parents, who founded a yeshiva, as well as his own appearance as a successful businessman.

== Business dealings ==
Some of the business names used by Dwek included Dwek Properties LLC, Corbett Holdings II LLC and SEM Realty Associates LLC (among many others under which Dwek owned a combined 316 area properties). At the time of his arrest by the FBI in 2006, he was taken into custody for a $50 million bank fraud involving PNC Bank. After his arrest, he became an informant for the FBI in a private sting called Operation Bid Rig which resulted in the arrest of 44 people in the state of New Jersey and Brooklyn, New York. Those arrested by authorities included public officials, politicians, and three Orthodox Rabbis from a Syrian Jewish background. PNC bank, along with two other financial firms filed an involuntary liquidation petition on Feb. 9, 2007, that forced Dwek into a Chapter 7 bankruptcy. He allegedly owes PNC $22.9 million, Washington Mutual $22.7 million, and Four Star Builders $58,388. The bankruptcy was converted to a Chapter 11 reorganization.

== Arrest ==
On October 20, 2009, Dwek pleaded guilty to federal bank fraud charges in US District Court in Newark, New Jersey and later that day pleaded guilty to "misconduct by a corporate official" in New Jersey Superior Court, Monmouth Vicinage in Freehold, New Jersey. Dwek was released on $10 million bond until a scheduled prison sentencing date of February 9, 2010. He was represented by lawyer Michael B. Himmel, who specializes in white collar criminal defense. On February 2, 2010, Deputy Mayor of Jersey City Leona Beldini, was convicted in Federal Court in Newark on 2 of 6 corruption related charges stemming from the FBI's Operation Bid Rig. The split verdict in Leona Beldini's case was hailed as a victory by both sides and may have cast doubt on the government's use of Solomon Dwek as an informant. Leona Beldini was represented by prominent defense attorneys Brian J. Neary and S. Emile Lisboa IV. During the trial, Dwek while working as an informant posing as a corrupt developer named "David Esenbach", appeared as a witness for the prosecution. Hidden camera films of him interacting with Beldini, were displayed as evidence. Dwek testified for five days, and got choked up during cross examination when asked whether he had any friends outside of FBI agents. Dwek also testified that he bribed his math teacher in high school in order to graduate. During the trial, it was revealed that the government hired a private contractor (a former F.B.I. agent) to conduct a wire tap of political consultant Jack Shaw's telephones. This same private contractor was hired by Dwek to provide security services and was paid $50,000 by Dwek. Dwek has been in hiding since his role as an informant became public. On March 19, 2010, defense attorneys for Leona Beldini filed a motion to overturn the verdict.

== Aftermath ==
Given the fact that Dwek acted as an informant in Operation Bid Rig against individuals allegedly involved in organized crime, as well as his being under heavy security during his court appearances, it is likely he would be eligible to enter the United States Federal Witness Protection Program following his eventual release from prison after a future sentencing date. The Syrian Jewish community in Monmouth County, New Jersey (where Dwek came from) was surprised that he became a government informant against other Syrian Jews, because the community has a long-standing unwritten policy of blanket solidarity. After Solomon Dwek's role as an informant became public, his father Rabbi Isaac Dwek gave a speech at the Synagogue of Deal in which he stated that his son Solomon was no longer welcome at his home. He also denounced the practice of acting as a government informant against other Jews.

On June 21, 2011, Dwek was arrested for car theft and denied bail. At the time of the sentencing Dwek's lawyer noted that Dwek had six children, the youngest an eight-week-old baby. On July 14, 2011, the car theft charges were dropped. However, Dwek remained in the Essex county jail awaiting sentencing.

On October 18, 2012, Dwek was sentenced to six years in federal prison for his conviction on bank fraud charges. On October 19, he received a sentence of four years in state prison for the separate fraud charges before the New Jersey Superior Court in Monmouth County. He served the two prison terms concurrently. In March 2015 he was released from prison.
