= Wheaton Bandit =

Unidentified bank robber in northeastern Illinois

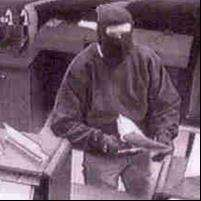
- Status: Unidentified

Details
- Span of crimes: 2002–2006
- Country: United States
- State: Illinois
- Locations: Wheaton; Carol Stream; Geneva; Naperville; Winfield; Glen Ellyn
- Weapon: Semi-automatic handgun

The Wheaton Bandit is an unidentified bank robber suspected to be responsible for as many as 16 armed robberies around Wheaton, Illinois from 2002 to 2006. He appeared to be 25 to 35 years old at the time of the robberies, always wore a hood or ski mask, and wore different clothing in each robbery. Instead of placing his finger on the gun trigger, he often kept his trigger finger along the side of the gun, a safety position that suggests firearms training. Outlines of his jackets suggest that he also wore a bulletproof vest.

== Reported sightings ==
There were at least two possible sightings of the Wheaton Bandit without a face covering. In late December 2004, an unidentified man entered the MidAmerica Bank in Glen Ellyn without conducting a transaction, but was recorded by the bank's security cameras. Two weeks later, in January 2005, the Wheaton Bandit robbed the bank, and the December visitor fit the known physical description of the robber. On November 29, 2006, a witness spotted a suspicious man in the parking lot of the Fifth Third Bank one hour before it was robbed. This witness helped the police draw a composite sketch of the suspicious person.

After the sketch of the parking lot man was released to the public on December 11, 2006, the crime spree abruptly ended and there were no further reports of the Wheaton Bandit. Despite a $50,000 reward being offered for information about the robber, the five-year statute of limitations on the bank robbery charges ran out on December 7, 2011.

== Robberies ==
Date	Institution	Location
January 14, 2002	West Suburban Bank	Wheaton: 295 West Loop
January 3, 2003	West Suburban Bank	Wheaton: 221 South West St.
January 11, 2003	West Suburban Bank	Wheaton: 295 West Loop
January 28, 2003	West Suburban Bank	Wheaton: 221 South West St.
February 12, 2003	West Suburban Bank	Carol Stream: 879 Geneva
March 4, 2003	West Suburban Bank	Wheaton: 221 South West St.
May 10, 2003	LaSalle Bank	Wheaton: 225 West Front
August 28, 2003	Harris Bank	Wheaton: 4 Blanchard Circle
January 22, 2004	Health Care Credit Union	Winfield: 27W460 Chicago Ave
July 22, 2004	Oak Brook Bank	Glen Ellyn: 487 Pennsylvania
January 14, 2005	MidAmerica Bank	Glen Ellyn: 674 Roosevelt Road
November 28, 2005	Harris Bank	Naperville: 507 South Washington
January 31, 2006	Glen Ellyn Bank & Trust	Glen Ellyn: 462 North Park
November 29, 2006	Fifth Third Bank	Winfield: 1 North 111 County Farm Road
December 1, 2006	Charter One Bank	Geneva: 421 Hamilton Street
December 7, 2006	Glen Ellyn Bank & Trust	Glen Ellyn: 462 North Park

== See also ==
- List of fugitives from justice who disappeared
