= Gina Champion-Cain =

Ponzi scheme operator

Gina Champion-Cain (born 1965) is an American former businesswoman and convicted felon who served as the president of American National Investments. She is known for operating the largest ponzi scheme in the history of San Diego and the largest female run ponzi scheme in American history.

In March 2021, Champion-Cain was sentenced to 15 years in federal prison for securities fraud, conspiracy, and obstruction of justice, and was ordered to pay tens of millions of dollars in restitution. She is currently serving her sentence at a federal prison camp Pekin Il and is scheduled for release in January 2033, with an order to pay nominal amounts quarterly while in custody and monthly restitution payments of at least $250 upon release.

== Early life and education ==
Champion-Cain was born in 1965 in Port Huron, Michigan. She received her early education from Pioneer High School. She earned a double major in philosophy and political science from the University of Michigan in 1987, followed by a master's degree in business administration from the University of San Diego in 1994. She also holds a Juris Doctor degree from the California Western School of Law.

== Career ==
Champion-Cain's early career was focused on asset management and real estate development, following in her father's footsteps. She began her career in the late 1980s in the apartment industry, where she managed and redeveloped distressed assets that were spun off by the Resolution Trust Company. In 1994, she joined the Irvine-based Koll Company, where she was part of a team responsible for redeveloping the La Jolla Square Shopping Center.

In 1997, Champion-Cain established her own firm and became involved in multi-million-dollar housing and commercial projects. Later, she diversified her business, expanding into the hospitality industry by opening restaurants, acquiring a steakhouse and sushi restaurant, and developing a beach apparel line named Luv Surf Apparel. She also acquired some vacation rental properties. Some of Champion-Cain's notable development projects included the House of Blues, Acqua Vista Apartments, Broadway Lofts, and Front Porch culinary stores.

In 2004, Champion-Cain tried to run for the 2004 San Diego mayoral election.

In 2006, the San Diego City Council proclaimed June 28 as "Gina Champion-Cain Day" in recognition of her contributions to the San Diego community.

In August 2019, the Securities and Exchange Commission accused Champion-Cain of orchestrating a $300 million liquor license lending scheme that defrauded dozens of investors. According to the plea agreement filed by the U.S. Attorney's office, Champion-Cain and her co-conspirators raised more than $400 million from hundreds of investors between 2012 and 2019, claiming that the funds would be used to make high-interest loans to individuals seeking alcohol licenses and would be safely held in an escrow account.

However, Champion-Cain knew these claims were false and instead used the investor funds to pay back other investors whose investments were due for redemption, embezzled funds to support her failing businesses, and maintain her lifestyle. This included the purchase of three homes, box seats at sporting events, cars, jewelry, and a $2 million salary for herself. When the SEC and FBI began investigating her activities in 2019, Champion-Cain and her co-conspirators attempted to cover up the crime by shredding documents, deleting emails, and hiding boxes of evidence in secret locations.

In March 2021, Gina Champion-Cain was sentenced to 15 years in federal prison after being convicted of securities fraud, conspiracy, and obstruction of justice. The court also ordered her to pay restitution amounting to tens of millions of dollars.

In 2022, Judge Burns issued an order stating that Champion-Cain would be required to pay nominal amounts quarterly while in custody. Upon her release, she would be obligated to make monthly restitution payments of at least $250. She is currently serving her sentence at a federal prison camp in Northern California and is scheduled for release in January 2033, which would reduce her total time in custody by more than three years compared to her original sentence.
