= Kay Van Wey =

American trial lawyer

- Occupation: Trial lawyer
- Years active: 1984–present
- Employer: Van Wey Law PLLC
- Organizations: American Board of Trial Advocates; American Association for Justice; Texas Trial Lawyers Association; Dallas Bar Association
- Known for: Medical malpractice litigation; representation of victims in the Christopher Duntsch ("Dr. Death") cases
- Notable work: Medical malpractice and institutional liability cases
- Television: Dr. Death: The Undoctored Story (2021); American Greed; Murder by Medic
- Awards: Texas Super Lawyers; Best Lawyers in America; Million Dollar Advocates Forum; Multi-Million Dollar Advocates Forum
- Website: www.vanweylaw.com

Kay Van Wey is an American trial lawyer specializing in medical malpractice and personal injury litigation. Based in Dallas, Texas, she is best known for her role in civil litigation related to former neurosurgeon Christopher Duntsch, commonly known as "Dr. Death," whose criminal conviction followed a series of malpractice lawsuits filed by Van Wey and other attorneys. She is the co-founder of the law firm Van Wey & Metzler and has practiced law since 1990.

== Career ==
Van Wey has focused her legal career on medical malpractice and institutional negligence cases, particularly those involving severe injury or death. Her practice has concentrated on complex litigation involving hospitals, physicians, and health care systems.

She co-founded Van Wey & Metzler, a Dallas-based law firm that limits its practice to catastrophic medical malpractice and birth injury cases.

Van Wey is board-certified in medical malpractice by the American Board of Professional Liability Attorneys and in personal injury trial law by the Texas Board of Legal Specialization. She is licensed to practice law in Texas, Oklahoma, and Illinois.

Van Wey has been known for her work in pill mill litigation, seeking justice for families that lost members to overmedication of prescription drugs, and was interviewed by Dan Rather on the topic.

Van Wey serves as an adjunct professor at the Southern Methodist University Dedman School of Law, where she contributes to students' legal education.

== Christopher Duntsch litigation (“Dr. Death”) ==
Van Wey gained national recognition for her involvement in civil lawsuits against neurosurgeon Christopher Duntsch, who practiced in the Dallas area between 2011 and 2013. Duntsch was accused of causing severe injuries to dozens of patients through improperly performed spinal surgeries.

Van Wey represented several of Duntsch’s former patients in malpractice actions and conducted extensive independent research into his training history, hospital privileges, and employment records. Her investigations identified gaps in his surgical training and failures in hospital oversight.

Through civil discovery and collaboration with medical professionals, Van Wey helped document patterns of misconduct that were later used by prosecutors. Her work contributed to the development of a criminal case against Duntsch, who was convicted in 2017 and sentenced to life in prison.

In interviews, Van Wey stated that hospitals often allowed Duntsch to resign without formal reporting, enabling him to obtain new privileges at other facilities. She has continued to speak publicly about regulatory and institutional failures revealed by the case.

== COVID-19 hospice whistleblower case ==
During the COVID-19 pandemic, Van Wey represented a whistleblower in a lawsuit against VITAS Healthcare, a national hospice provider. The lawsuit alleged that sales representatives were encouraged to enter locked-down nursing homes by posing as essential workers in order to solicit patients. The lawsuit was highlighted in various news media, and Van Wey was interviewed about it on a CBS This Morning segment.

She characterized the alleged conduct as posing risks to residents and health care workers and emphasized the public health implications of such practices during the pandemic. Van Wey also appeared on the television program Brian Ross Investigates to discuss the case. During the broadcast, she stated that sales representatives were being encouraged to use “creative” methods to gain access to facilities, including bringing food to staff members.

== Advocacy and public commentary ==
Van Wey has frequently spoken publicly about patient safety, medical oversight, and hospital accountability. Following the Duntsch litigation, she participated in conferences, panel discussions, and professional training programs addressing institutional liability and medical credentialing.

She has delivered presentations on hospital governance, clinical standards, and lessons learned from high-profile malpractice cases, including presentations to medical staff organizations and legal associations. Van Wey has also published articles in legal and professional publications addressing medical negligence and litigation strategy.

In 2025, Van Wey testified before the Texas House of Representatives Judiciary and Civil Jurisprudence Committee in support of House Bill 923 (HB 923), which sought to reform the Texas Medical Disclosure Panel to make the informed consent process more transparent and fair for patients. The bill was passed not long after, in May 2025.

== Legacy and impact ==
Van Wey appeared in the Peacock documentary, “Dr. Death: The Undoctored Story” (2021, Season 1, episodes 1-4), where she discussed the Duntsch case. She also discussed it in the TV series, “American Greed” (Season 14, episode 3, 2021), and in the TV series, “Murder by Medic” (Season 2, episode 6, 2024). She also appeared in the The Dr. Oz Show episode 9 of season 10, “True Crime Thursday: Dr. Death: The Neurosurgeon Who Ended Up Killing and Paralyzing 33 Patients”.

Van Wey was also interviewed on CBS News morning show about her involvement in the VITAS Healthcare COVID-19 whistleblower case.

Her later work in whistleblower and institutional liability cases has continued to focus on regulatory compliance, patient safety, and hospital governance. For example, Van Wey has pushed for open disciplinary records for doctors in Texas.
