= Barton H. Watson =

American businessman and conman

- Born: Barton Harry Watson; October 18, 1960; Belding, Michigan, U.S.
- Died: November 24, 2004 (aged 44); Ada, Michigan, U.S.
- Education: Belding High School
- Alma mater: University of Michigan
- Occupation: Businessman
- Spouse: Krista Kotlarz

Barton Harry Watson (October 18, 1960 – November 24, 2004) was the founder of CyberNET Engineering. He committed suicide after the company was raided by the FBI for mail fraud, unveiling nearly US$100 million in debt.

== Biography ==
Watson was the son of Geraldine Watson (née Johnson) and Gerald Watson, a well-respected local merchant. Bart, as he was known as a schoolboy, grew up in Belding, Michigan, a suburb of Grand Rapids. Barton attended Belding High School, graduating as valedictorian in 1978. He enrolled at the University of Michigan in Ann Arbor in the fall of 1978. While in Ann Arbor, Watson also volunteered at an ambulance company. He dropped out after only one semester and returned to Belding to help his mother run a local automobile service station.

=== Washington, D.C. ===
Following the divorce of his parents and as a result of financial pressures, Watson and his mother Geraldine moved to the Washington, D.C. area in 1981, residing for a short time in an apartment in Alexandria, Virginia, and later moving to another apartment in Washington near Glover-Archbold Park. Through the use of a fraudulent résumé, Watson obtained employment as a junior account executive at the I Street branch of E. F. Hutton. Watson's boss and mentor was the notorious Perry Bacon, who figured prominently in the E. F. Hutton check-kiting scandal of the early 1980s.

Watson soon managed accounts worth over a million dollars. However, once it emerged that he had embezzled more than $700,000 in funds from nine clients, E. F. Hutton fired him in January 1985. The National Association of Securities Dealers subsequently banned him from the securities industry for life. He went on the lam, but was caught and arrested in San Francisco five months later. In May, 1987 Watson pleaded guilty to mail fraud and was sentenced by Judge Gerhard A. Gesell to one to three years in federal prison.

== CyberNET Engineering ==
Upon his release from prison after more than two years, Watson returned to Belding and lived with his father for six months, working as a server at a Red Lobster restaurant in Grand Rapids.

Afterward, he moved to Grand Rapids where he worked as a sales clerk at a large computer store. By 1990 he had met John Straayer, and together they founded a company called WS Services, a "value added reseller" of computer systems. The business took off, and they changed the company's name to CyberNET Engineering.

After meeting his future wife, Krista Kotlarz, in 1991, Watson's relationship with John Straayer deteriorated. It bottomed out in 1992 when Straayer discovered Watson was keeping two sets of books. By his estimate, Watson had embezzled over $300,000 from company accounts for personal use. He sued Watson, and subsequently found out that Watson had hidden his 1987 fraud case. Watson responded with a countersuit, saying that Straayer had been the one embezzling funds. Finally. in 1993, Watson and Straayer agreed to dissolve the partnership in a settlement. However, Watson kept the CyberNET name and relaunched it as a reseller.

Between 1991 and 2000, CyberNET was a moderately successful reseller of Compaq computers as well as providing design and installation for clients. Starting in 2000, however, Watson began to obtain fraudulent loans from a large number of financial institutions based on faked and forged financial statements. By 2002 the Watsons were living a fabulous lifestyle, owning a million-dollar home in Ada, Michigan and driving a Land Rover, a Ferrari, a BMW, a Bentley and two Rolls-Royces. This lifestyle, and an ultimately unsuccessful attempt to expand the business internationally, were financed by an ever-increasing number of fraudulent loans. In what became a classic Ponzi scheme, new loans were used to repay the debt already incurred.

Watson engaged in other fraudulent schemes as well. For instance, one of his salesmen uncovered an attempt to pass off remanufactured computers as new and sell them to the Hastings, Michigan school system. However, a civil suit by the school system ended in an out-of-court settlement.

Watson was a very active participant on the travel website FlyerTalk, where he posted numerous anecdotes and observations from his luxurious travels, which often entailed flying to cities around the world in first class. His username on FlyerTalk was "B Watson", and his posts on FlyerTalk remain viewable to this day.

== Raid, suicide and trials ==
In December 2003, an anonymous CyberNET employee alerted the FBI office in Grand Rapids to potential fraud at CyberNET, such as fraudulent loans and forged invoices. The Internal Revenue Service and United States Postal Inspection Service quickly joined the investigation.

Investigators quickly got in touch with former CyberNET accountant Guy Hiestand, who had suspected shady doings at CyberNET for some time. However, he had never actually reported it because he did not know the culprit. Investigators discovered that CyberNET had rooked four banks into loaning money for new equipment before depositing it into shell companies to keep the company afloat.

On November 17, 2004, federal agents raided the CyberNET headquarters on South Division Avenue in Grand Rapids, seizing the business and all of the Watsons's personal assets. Although he had not yet been charged, Watson knew that he faced decades in prison if convicted. He went incommunicado until the night of November 23, when he called 9-1-1 and told the operator that he had a gun in his mouth. This triggered a lengthy standoff with Watson barricading himself in his home. It ended when Watson committed suicide in the early hours of November 24. It was subsequently determined that CyberNET and the Watsons had over $100 million in debt against approximately $2 million in assets.

On June 22, 2006, CyberNET president James Horton pleaded guilty in U.S. District Court in Grand Rapids to four counts of felony mail fraud, and was sentenced to 7½ years in prison. Paul Wright pleaded guilty on August 31, 2007 to federal charges of conspiracy to defraud banks and finance companies, money laundering and mail fraud. He was sentenced to 2½ years in prison. Krista Watson pleaded guilty on September 4, 2007 to federal charges of conspiracy and tax evasion, and was sentenced to seven years in prison.
