= American Greed =

American documentary television series on CNBC

- Genre: Documentary
- Narrated by: Stacy Keach
- Country of origin: United States
- Original language: English
- No. of seasons: 15
- No. of episodes: 222 (& 3 specials) (list of episodes)

Production
- Executive producers: Sharon Barrett; Charles Schaffer; Mike West; Robin Feinberg; Luke Bauer
- Producer: Mike West
- Production location: Chicago, Illinois
- Running time: 42–44 minutes
- Production company: Kurtis Productions

Original release
- Network: CNBC
- Release: June 21, 2007 – March 7, 2023

American Greed (also known as American Greed: Scams, Scoundrels and Scandals and as American Greed: Scams, Schemes and Broken Dreams) is an American documentary television series on CNBC. The series focuses on cases of Ponzi schemes, embezzlement and other white collar crimes and features interviews with police investigators, fraud victims and sometimes fraudsters.

It was initially created by Mark Hoffman, the President, CEO and Chairman of the Board of Trustees and Directors of CNBC, and it is produced by Bill Kurtis' Kurtis Productions. The program is narrated by Stacy Keach Jr., who was recruited because Kurtis himself was unavailable for that purpose. It premiered on June 21, 2007. As of July 2024 the series is currently on a hiatus, but has not been cancelled.

== Subjects ==
The business-reality program focuses on the stories behind high-profile corporate and white-collar crimes, betrayals, and scams in American history, including the financial scandals involving WorldCom, HealthSouth, Tyco International, and CyberNET. Besides these high-profile cases, stories have featured lower-profile financial crimes that have affected individual investors and smaller companies, including various Ponzi schemes, real estate and other investment frauds, bank robbery, identity theft, medical fraud, embezzlement, insurance fraud, murder-for-hire, art theft, credit card fraud, money laundering, and political corruption.

In addition, there have been three American Greed special presentations: American Greed Special: Bernie Madoff Behind Bars; American Greed: Special Presentation: 9/11 Fraud – "A Contractor Capitalizes on Disaster"; and Mob Money: An American Greed Special Presentation.

In April 2022, American Greed and CNBC partnered with AMC to deliver a special episode detailing the life and crimes of fictional lawyer Jimmy McGill in promotion for the 6th season of Better Call Saul.

== Companion series ==
American Greed has had at least three companion programs, all of which have also been narrated by Stacy Keach Jr.

In August 2012, CNBC aired the series American Greed: The Fugitives, which focused on active cases of alleged white-collar crime. The show documented stories of suspects who were still at large and had continued to evade authorities. It lasted 2 seasons, covering 13 cases of financial crimes. After the November 14, 2013, airing of American Greed: The Fugitives #12, viewer tips led to the successful November 26, 2013, arrest of FBI Most Wanted fugitive David Kaup, who had been a fugitive since December 17, 2012, when he failed to appear for sentencing in Los Angeles.

In early 2019, CNBC aired another companion series, American Greed: Deadly Rich, which focused on high-profile murder cases involving the wealthy.

On July 15, 2020, it was announced that another companion series titled American Greed: Biggest Cons would premiere on July 20, 2020. When American Greed: Biggest Cons did so premiere, it updated some of the stories the main program had previously featured, such as its profiles of Madoff and Martin Shkreli and its study of William "Rick" Singer's college-admission scheme.

A few weeks before the Better Call Saul season 6 premiere on April Fools' Day 2022, the CNBC Prime YouTube account uploaded American Greed: James McGill. The ten-minute short is a faux documentary done in the same style as the popular series with the same name, and recaps the events of both Breaking Bad and Better Call Saul. Narrated by Keach, the mockumentary features in-character interviews from several recurring cast members from Better Call Saul, including DA Suzanne Ericsen (Julie Pearl), Deputy DA Bill Oakley (Peter Diseth) and Kim Wexler's former boss Rich Schweikart (Dennis Boutsikaris), as they recount their memories of Jimmy McGill and Kim Wexler. Also making their reappearances are Craig and Betsy Kettleman (Jeremy Shamos and Julie Ann Emery, respectively), who had not appeared on the series since the first season, but made their last canonical appearance in the short film No Picnic, which was released after the third season.
