= List of con artists =

This is a list of notable individuals who exploited confidence tricks.

== Born or active in the 17th century ==
- William Chaloner (1650–1699): Serial counterfeiter and confidence trickster proven guilty by Sir Isaac Newton.

== Born or active in the 18th century ==
- Gregor MacGregor (1786–1845): Scottish con man who tried to attract investment and settlers for the non-existent country of "Poyais".
- Jeanne of Valois-Saint-Rémy (1756–1791): Chief conspirator in the Affair of the Diamond Necklace, which further tarnished the French royal family's already-poor reputation and, along with other causes, eventually led to the French Revolution.
- Frau von Pfuel (fl. 1751): she and her two daughters used alchemical demonstrations to embezzle gold from Frederick the Great.

== Born or active in the 19th century ==
- William Rockefeller Sr. (1810–1906): an American businessman, lumberman, herbalist, salesman, and con-artist. Two of his sons were Standard Oil co-founders John Davison Rockefeller Sr. and William Avery Rockefeller Jr.
- George Appo (1856–1930): American fraudster, operated in New York and was involved in green goods scams. Wrote an autobiography and also had a biography written about him which discusses prison conditions and various other socio-economic conditions in the later 19th century.
- Lou Blonger (1849–1924): American pickpocket and fraudster, organized a massive ring of con men in Denver in the early 1900s.
- C. L. Blood (1835–1908): American patent medicine huckster, fraudster, and blackmailer.
- Amy Bock (1859–1943): Tasmanian-born New Zealand con artist who committed numerous petty scams and frauds, and in 1909 impersonated a man in order to marry a wealthy woman.
- Cassie Chadwick (1857–1907): Canadian woman who defrauded banks out of millions by pretending to be the illegitimate daughter (and heir) of Andrew Carnegie
- Eduardo de Valfierno (1850–1931): Argentine con man who posed as a marqués and allegedly masterminded the theft of the Mona Lisa in 1911.
- Lord Gordon Gordon (1840–1874): British man who defrauded $1 million from Jay Gould, who was fighting for control of the Erie Railroad.
- Bertha Heyman (born c. 1851): American con artist, also known as "Big Bertha"; active in the United States in the late 19th century.
- Canada Bill Jones (c.1837–1880): King of the three-card monte men
- John E.W. Keely (1837–1898): American mechanic and carnival barker who claimed to have discovered a new "force" on the likes of Thomas Edison and Nikola Tesla and bilked investors and socialites until the day of his death.
- David Lamar (1877–1934): American con artist known as "The Wolf of Wall Street".
- Daniel Levey (c. 1875–?): American swindler and gambler, specialized in passing fake checks and stealing goods under the pretense of brokering sales for their owners.
- Victor Lustig (1890–1947): Born in Bohemia (today's Czech Republic) and known as "the man who sold the Eiffel Tower twice".
- William McCloundy (1859–19??): American con artist, convicted of selling the Brooklyn Bridge to a tourist.
- Phillip Musica (1877–1938): Italian fraudster known for tax and securities frauds, culminating in the McKesson and Robbins scandal in 1938.
- George C. Parker (1860–1936): American con man who sold New York City monuments to tourists, including the Brooklyn Bridge, which he sold twice a week for years. The saying "I'll sell you the Brooklyn Bridge" originated from this con.
- Charles Ponzi (1882–1949): Italian swindler and con artist; "Ponzi scheme" is a type of fraud named after him.
- John J. "Bald Jack" Ryan (1862–1930): American gambler and horse-track owner who created a pyramid scheme.
- Soapy Smith (1860–1898): American con artist and gangster in Denver and Creede, Colorado and Skagway, Alaska, in the 1880s and 1890s
- Adele Spitzeder (1832–1895): German actress that arguably was the first to perpetrate a Ponzi scheme between 1869 and 1872 when she defrauded thousands of people by promising them 10% return of interest monthly which she paid with the money of new investors.
- William Thompson (fl. 1840–1849): American criminal whose deceptions caused the term confidence man to be coined.
- Ferdinand Ward (1851–1925): American swindler whose victims included Thomas Nast and the former U.S. President Ulysses S. Grant.
- Joseph Weil (1875–1976): American con man.
- Fernando Wood (1812–1881): U.S. Congressman, Mayor of New York City, and a con artist who defrauded his brother-in-law and three others of $20,000 in a scheme involving the charter of a ship to sell goods during the California Gold Rush.
- Islam Akhun: Uyghur con artist from Hotan who sold fake Silk Road manuscripts to European archaeologists.

== Born or active in the 20th century ==
- Harry Anderson (1952–2018) American actor, comedian and magician. Anderson was towed around the country by his mother, a grifter, where he learned the trade. He funneled that into a career as a magician and a comedian landing his own TV show.
- Archibald Stansfeld Belaney a.k.a. Grey Owl (1888–1938), a British-born conservationist, fur trapper, and writer impersonated a Native American man.
- Alan Conway (1934–1998): American con man best known for impersonating film director Stanley Kubrick.
- Bernie Cornfeld (1927–1995): Ran the Investors Overseas Service, alleged to be a Ponzi scheme.
- Ferdinand Waldo Demara (1921–1982): Famed as "the Great Imposter".
- David Hampton (1964–2003): American actor and impostor who posed as Sidney Poitier's son "David" in 1983, which inspired a play and a film, Six Degrees of Separation.
- Susanna Mildred Hill: Perpetrator of the “lonely hearts scam”.
- Marie Sophie Hingst (1987–2019): Blogger and historian who claimed to be descended from Holocaust survivors.
- Sharmel Iris (1889–1967), poet who used pseudonyms to publish praise of himself and used false claims to obtain benefits.
- Harry Jelinek (1905–1986): Czech con artist alleged to have sold the Karlstejn Castle to American industrialists.
- Sante Kimes (1934–2014): Convicted of fraud, robbery, murder, and over 100 other crimes along with her son Kenneth Kimes, Jr.
- Edgar Laplante (?–1944): Claimed to be "Chief White Elk." Stole from aristocratic European women and gave away large quantities of the money in cash. Presented to Mussolini as a visiting foreign dignitary.
- Don Lapre (1964–2011): American TV pitchman known for peddling various get-rich-quick schemes.
- Daniel Levey (c. 1875–?): American swindler and gambler, specialized in passing fake checks and stealing goods under the pretense of brokering sales for their owners.
- Bernard Madoff (1938–2021): Former American stock broker and non-executive chairman of the NASDAQ stock market who admitted to the operation of the largest Ponzi scheme in history.
- Gaston Means (1879–1938): American con-man and associate of the Ohio Gang.
- Natwarlal (1912–2009): Legendary Indian con man known for having repeatedly "sold" the Taj Mahal, the Red Fort, the Rashtrapati Bhavan and the Parliament House of India.
- Lou Pearlman (1954–2016): Former boy band impresario, convicted for perpetrating a large and long-running Ponzi scheme.
- Riley Shepard (1918–2009): Country musician who used numerous pseudonyms to break the terms of his recording contracts and defraud investors.
- Reed Slatkin (1949–2015): American investor and co-founder of EarthLink, sentenced in 2003 to 14 years in prison for running one of the largest Ponzi schemes in US history, scamming more than $600 million from 800 investors.
- Rose Sutro (1870-1957) and Ottilie Sutro (1872-1970): Sisters, piano duo. Entrusted by composer Max Bruch to sell the autograph manuscript of his most famous work, his Violin Concerto No. 1, and send him the profits to lift him out of post-WWI poverty, the sisters claimed to have sold it and sent him worthless German marks. They later sold it after his death for a small fortune to heiress Mary Flagler Cary.
- Jerry Tarbot (?–?): Claimed he was amnesic victim of World War I.
- Alvin Clarence "Titanic Thompson" Thomas (1892–1974): Gambler, golf hustler, proposition bet conman.
- Barton H. Watson (1960–2004): Former CEO of global technology company CyberNET who died of suicide after the FBI raided his offices. Watson was accused of stealing millions as a con man, but died before being arrested. Prior to CyberNET he embezzled funds from customers as an E.F. Hutton broker and embezzled funds from his former business partner in WS Services.
- Alessandro Zarrelli (1984–2018): Italian amateur footballer who posed as a fictitious Italian Football Federation official and attempted to dupe clubs in the United Kingdom in to signing a supposed talented young professional player (himself) in a bid to earn a pro contract and kick start a career in the sport.

== Living people ==
- Frank Abagnale, Jr. (1948): U.S. check forger and impostor turned FBI consultant; his autobiography was made into the movie Catch Me If You Can. Abagnale impersonated a PanAm pilot, and claimed to have impersonated a doctor, a lawyer, and a teacher to illegally make over $2.5 million.
- Ramon Olorunwa Abbas (1982): also known as Hushpuppi, Nigerian con artist that perfected a business email compromise internet scam that he operated from Dubai.
- Samantha Azzopardi (1988): An Australian con artist who has been accused of many instances of conning families and authorities in Australia, Ireland and Canada. She has often posed as a child victim of abuse or trafficking, and has no apparent financial motive. She first made news headlines in October 2013 when a young girl was found in a distressed state outside the General Post Office, Dublin and was taken into the care of the Garda Síochána (the Irish Police), but was unwilling to speak and remained unidentified for month.
- Sam Bankman-Fried (1992): Founder of a cryptocurrency exchange who stole his clients' funds.
- Gilbert Chikli (1966): Together with Anthony Lasarevitsch (born 1985), impersonated French foreign defence minister Jean-Yves Le Drian using silicone masks on video conference software to appeal to politicians and business executives for money. Fraudulently obtained €55 million.
- Steve Comisar (1961): Career confidence trickster best known for selling over one million solar-powered clothes dryers for $49.95 each which turned out to be clotheslines.
- Ali Dia (1965): Senegalese semi-professional footballer, duped the manager of Premier League team Southampton into signing him after posing as World Player of The Year George Weah in a phone call in which he gave himself a fake reference
- Marc Dreier (1950): Founder of attorney firm Dreier LLP. Convicted of selling approximately $700 million worth of fictitious promissory notes, and other crimes
- Frank Dux (1956): A Canadian born American Marine Corps Reservist who is used as an example in the 1998 book Stolen Valor.
- Kevin Foster (1958/59): British investment fraudster, convicted of running a Ponzi scheme
- Belle Gibson (1991): Faked a cancer diagnosis, pretended to manage it through diet and natural medicine, and then raised money for cancer charities which she kept for herself.
- Anthony Gignac (1970): Falsely impersonated members of Saudi or Middle Eastern royalty to entrap victims in investment scams and other schemes, currently serving an 18-year jail sentence
- Randy Glass: Defrauded jewelry traders and became involved in the entrapment of undercover arms dealers
- Robert Hendy-Freegard (1971): Briton who kidnapped people by impersonating an MI5 agent and conned them out of money
- Elizabeth Holmes (1984): CEO of Theranos. Convicted of criminal fraud in United States v. Elizabeth A. Holmes, et al. for defrauding investors.
- James Arthur Hogue (1959): U.S. impostor who most famously entered Princeton University by posing as a self-taught orphan
- Brian Kim (1975/76): Hedge fund manager who pleaded guilty to a Ponzi scheme, passport fraud, and other crimes
- Russel King, convicted fraudster known for his part in the doomed purchase of Notts County Football Club, claiming non existent connections to the Bahraini royal family. In 2019 he was there sentenced to six years imprisonment. He was released in 2021.
- Bashar Kiwan (1966): Mastermind of the Comoros passport sales scandal, in which he duped the government of the Comoros Islands into believing that they would receive hundreds of millions in investments from rich Gulf countries in exchange for selling Comorian citizenships to Bidoon stateless residents. Passports were sold outside official channels to Iranians attempting to skirt international sanctions, and proceeds from the scheme were illegally siphoned off to Bachar Kiwan and his associates.
- Rudy Kurniawan (wine connoisseur and collector) (b. 1976): Pulled off the biggest wine scam in history. Famously consigned several lots of Clos St. Denis from Domaine Ponsot from vintages long prior to any recorded production of Ponsot wines from that vineyard.
- Anthony Lasarevitsch (1985): Together with Gilbert Chikli (born 1966), impersonated French foreign defence minister Jean-Yves Le Drian using silicone masks on video conference software to appeal to politicians and business executives for money. Fraudulently obtained €55 million.
- Simon Leviev (1990): Known as the Tinder Swindler, Leviev is an Israeli con artist who swindled more than $10 million from several women in Europe, Israel, United States etc., by pretending to be a son of a billionaire diamond magnate; inspired the Netflix documentary The Tinder Swindler.
- Simon Lovell (1957): English comedy magician, card shark actor and con man
- Jho Low (1981): Claimed to be a financial expert and trusted by Malaysian prime minister, Najib Razak, in managing 1MDB, a Malaysian sovereign wealth fund. He abused his position and stole billions of US dollars, causing Malaysia to end up in heavy debt and further devaluation of its currency.
- Gina Marks (1973): American "psychic" con artist
- Matt the Knife (1987): American-born con artist, card cheat and pickpocket who, from the ages of approximately 14 through 21, bilked dozens of casinos, corporations and at least one Mafia crime family
- Billy McFarland (1991): Organizer of the Fyre Festival.
- Barry Minkow (1967): Known for the ZZZZ Best scam
- Richard Allen Minsky (1944): Scammed female victims by posing as an attorney over the phone and convincing them to give him sex or money in order to get their loved ones released from jail.
- Jim Norman (musician) (1948): Used the ESPAVO Foundation and Thrum Records to defraud millions of dollars in a cross-border advance fee scam, and was eventually convicted of conspiracy to commit wire fraud
- Christophe Rocancourt (1967): French con artist who scammed affluent people by masquerading in turn as a French nobleman, the heir to the Rockefeller family or family member of a celebrity.
- Steven Jay Russell (1957): Georgia police officer who impersonated several individuals to escape from a Texas prison; embezzled from the North American Medical Management corporation; inspired the movie I Love You Phillip Morris
- George Santos (1988): American politician who fabricated his entire life story.
- Anna Sorokin (1991): Russian-born German con artist who pretended to be a wealthy German heiress under the name Anna Delvey. Inspired the Netflix limited series Inventing Anna.
- Ong Kean Swan (1982): Ran multi-level pyramid schemes in China, Malaysia, Singapore and Taiwan; walked away with an estimated US$35 million

== See also ==
- List of fraudsters
- Impostor
