= Hostinné =

- Town
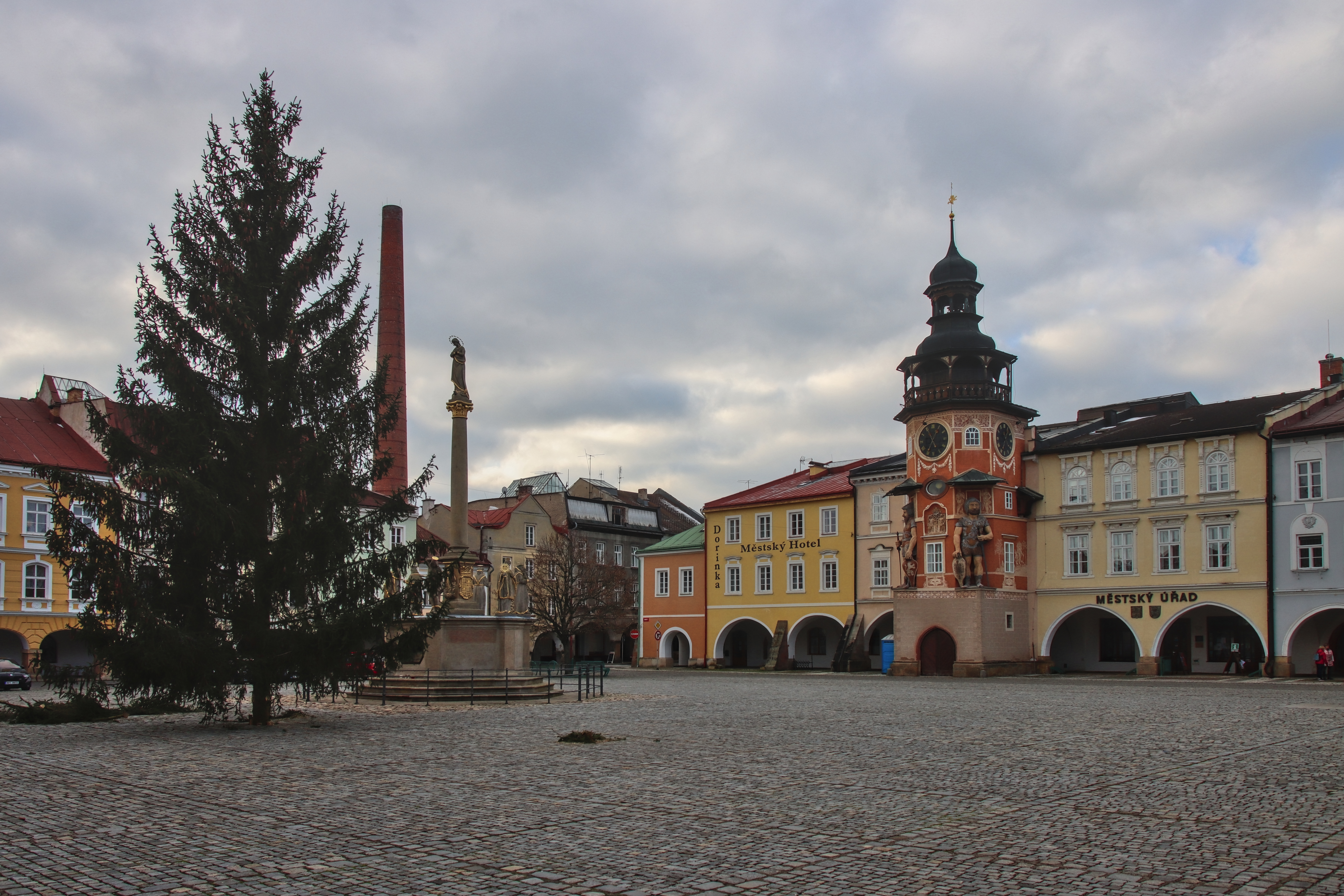
- Town hall on the town square

- Flag Coat of arms

- Location in the Czech Republic
- Coordinates: 50°32′28″N 15°43′24″E
- Country: Czech Republic
- Region: Hradec Králové
- District: Trutnov
- First mentioned: 1270

Government
  - Mayor: Dagmar Sahánková

Area
  - Total: 8.07 km^{2} (3.12 sq mi)
- Elevation: 351 m (1,152 ft)

Population (2026-01-01)
  - Total: 4,082
  - Density: 506/km^{2} (1,310/sq mi)
- Time zone: UTC+1 (CET)
  - Summer (DST): UTC+2 (CEST)
- Postal code: 543 71
- Website: www.hostinne.info

Hostinné (Czech pronunciation: [ˈɦoscɪnɛː]; German: Arnau) is a town in Trutnov District in the Hradec Králové Region of the Czech Republic. It has about 4,200 inhabitants. The town is located on the Elbe River in the Giant Mountains Foothills.

Hostinné was founded in the second half of the 13th century. The historic town centre is well preserved and is protected as an urban monument zone. The most important monument of Hostinné is the Renaissance town hall, which is protected as a national cultural monument.

== Etymology ==
The name was probably derived from the Czech adjective hostinný ('hospitable') or hostinský ('guest's', related to guest). It is rather unlikely that the name was derived from the personal name Host. The German name Arnau can be translated as "Arn's floodplain".

== Geography ==
Hostinné is located about 13 kilometres (8 mi) west of Trutnov and 37 km (23 mi) north of Hradec Králové. It lies in the Giant Mountains Foothills. The highest point is at 465 m (1,526 ft) above sea level. The town is situated in a valley of the Elbe River.

== History ==
The first written mention of Hostinné is from 1270. It was founded during the reign of King Ottokar II, during the colonisation of the upper Elbe.

During the Hussite Wars in 1424, Hostinné was besieged by Jan Žižka but never conquered. The town achieved the greatest prosperity during the rule of the Waldstein family in 1521–1634, especially after a large fire in 1610, when all the notable buildings in the town were reconstructed in the Renaissance style.

From 1938 to 1945, the town was annexed by Nazi Germany and administered as part of the Reichsgau Sudetenland.

== Demographics ==
Historical population

Year	Pop.	±%
1869	3,128	—
1880	3,754	+20.0%
1890	4,203	+12.0%
1900	4,398	+4.6%
1910	4,503	+2.4%

Year	Pop.	±%
1921	4,242	−5.8%
1930	4,650	+9.6%
1950	4,084	−12.2%
1961	4,249	+4.0%
1970	4,229	−0.5%

Year	Pop.	±%
1980	5,016	+18.6%
1991	5,181	+3.3%
2001	4,886	−5.7%
2011	4,519	−7.5%
2021	4,128	−8.7%

Source: Censuses

== Economy ==
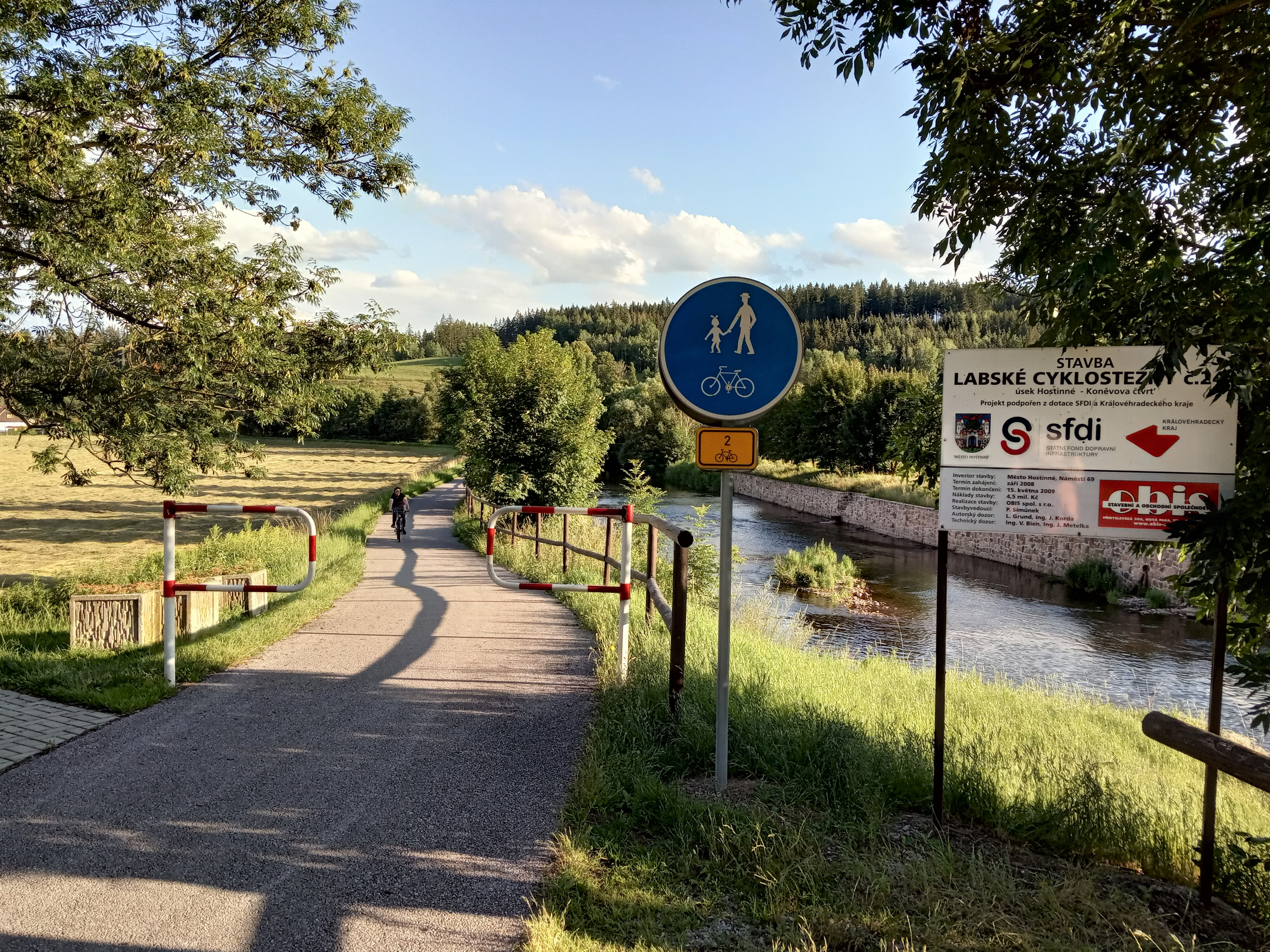
Cycle path along the Elbe

Hostinné is known for its paper mill. The tradition of this industry started here in 1835.

== Transport ==
Hostinné is located on the railway lines Trutnov–Kolín and Trutnov–Vrchlabí. There are three railway stations: Hostinné, Hostinné město and Prosečné, which serves the neighbouring municipality of Prosečné.

== Sights ==
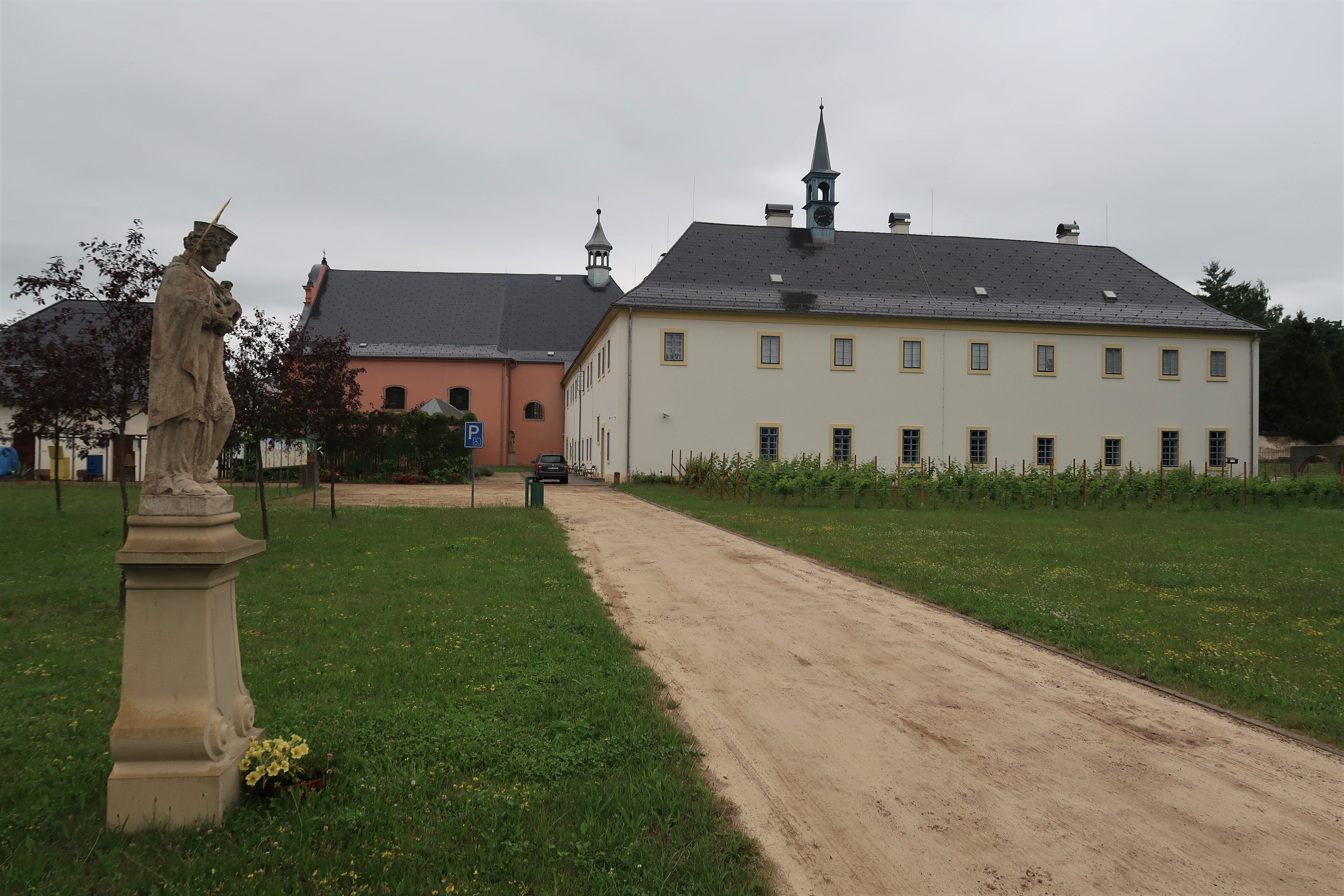
Monastery complex

The town square, called simply Náměstí ('the square'), has regular rectangular shape. In the middle of the square is a Baroque Marian column from 1678. The main landmark of the town square is the town hall, mentioned already in the mid-15th century. It was rebuilt in the Renaissance style in 1525, when the tower was added, but it preserved its late Gothic core. The town hall was rebuilt after a fire in 1610 and decorated with sgraffito. It is among the most valuable town hall buildings in the country and since 2024, it has been protected as a national cultural monument.

The Church of the Holy Trinity is as old as the town. Its main part is from the Renaissance period. It has a 53 metres (174 ft)-high tower with two bells from 1599 and 1612.

The Church of Saint Francis of Assisi from 1598 was originally a small cemetery church. In 1678–1684, the Franciscan monastery was built next to the church and the church was donated to the monks, who later extended it. Today, the monastery church houses a unique collection of plaster casts of ancient sculptures dating from 1912.

== Notable people ==
- Karel Klíč (1841–1926), painter, photographer, inventor of photogravure
- Emil Votoček (1872–1950), chemist, composer and music theorist
- Victor Lustig (1890–1947), con artist known for "selling the Eiffel Tower twice"

== Twin towns – sister cities ==
Hostinné is twinned with:

- Bensheim, Germany
- Wojcieszów, Poland
