= Kevin Ingram =

Kevin Ingram may refer to:

- Kevin Ingram (arena football) (born 1977), American football wide receiver and defensive back
- Kevin Ingram (quarterback) (born 1962), American football quarterback
- Kevin Ingram (bond trader) (born c. 1958), American bond trader and felon
