= Majestic Records =

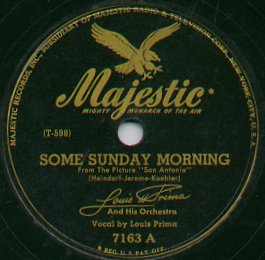
The label of a Majestic record

Majestic Records was a mid-20th century record label based in New York City, incorporated in 1945 as a wholly owned subsidiary of Majestic Radio & Television. The label enjoyed its greatest commercial success in the 1940s until expansion and supplying its distributors with pressings of discs created financial problems; the label folded in 1948.

For a time in the 1940s, bandleader Ben Selvin headed the label's artists & repertory. The company was headed by former New York City mayor Jimmy Walker.

Artists who recorded on Majestic included: Jimmie Lunceford, Louis Prima, Bud Freeman, Slim Bryant, Eddy Howard, the Four Shades of Rhythm, the DeMarco Sisters, the Three Suns, Thelma Carpenter, Georgia Gibbs, Mildred Bailey, George Olsen, George Paxton and His Orchestra, Ray McKinley, Phil Regan, the Jones Brothers, Ella Logan, Jan Peerce, Jane Froman, Leon McAuliffe, Foy Willing and the Riders of the Purple Sage, Riley Shepard, the Merry Macs, and Bob Johnston.

== See also ==
- List of record labels
