= Karel Klíč =

Czech artist

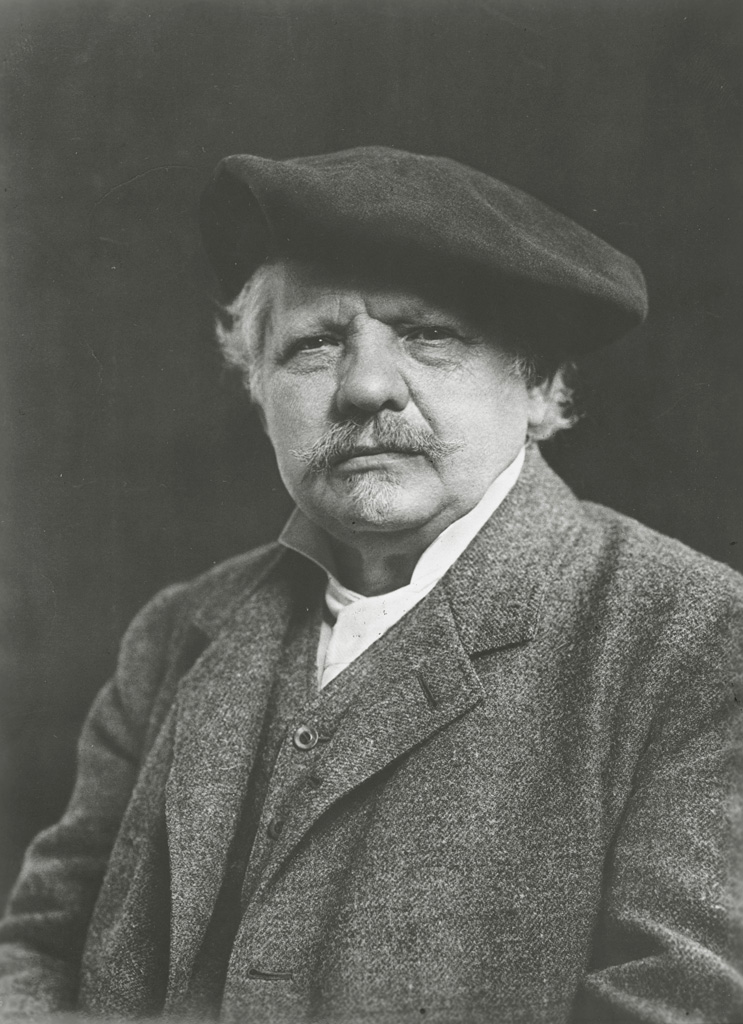
Karel Václav Klíč. Photo from earlier than 1919.

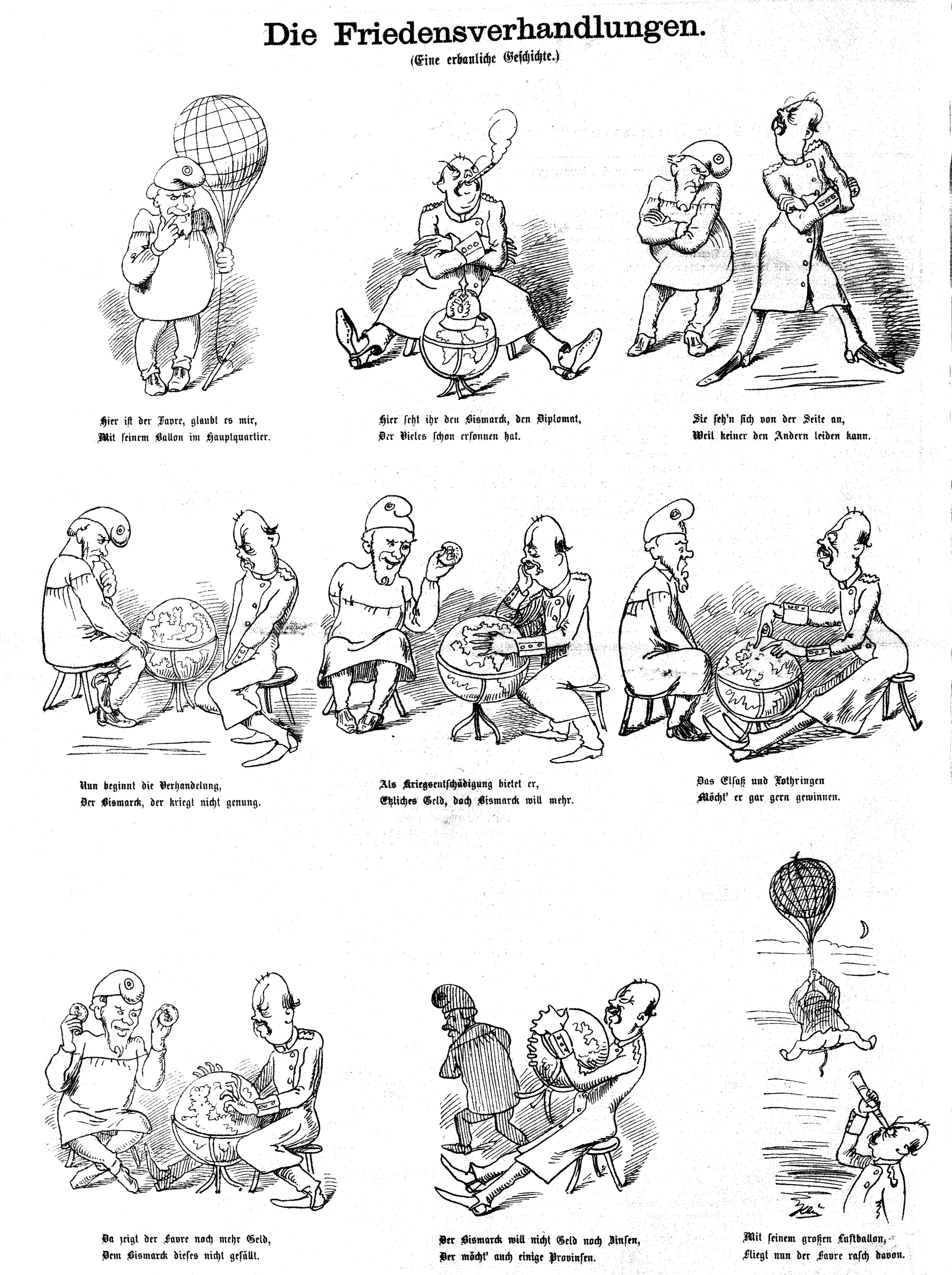
Comics by Karel Klíč, commenting unsuccessful peace negotiations between Jules Favre and Otto von Bismarck during Franco-Prussian War in October 1870.

Karel Václav Klíč (sometimes written Karl Klietsch, 30 May 1841, Hostinné – 16 November 1926, Vienna) was a Czech painter, photographer, early comics artist, caricaturist, lithographer and illustrator. He was one of the inventors of photogravure (heliogravura in Czech).

Klíč had such artistic talent that he was admitted into the Art Academy in Prague at the age of 14. For ridiculing school officials he was soon expelled, but eventually finished the school in 1862. Klíč worked as a photographer, caricaturist and illustrator in Brno, Budapest and Vienna, all the time trying to improve the technology of picture reproduction. During a long night in 1877, while working with zinc relief etching, he discovered, by chance, a process leading to photogravure. He further improved the process in 1890, when working in England.
