= Kevin Ingram (bond trader) =

American businessman and convicted felon

- Born: c. 1958; Philadelphia, Pennsylvania, U.S.
- Education: Massachusetts Institute of Technology (BSc); Stanford University (MBA)
- Occupations: Bond trader; Investment banker
- Spouses: Aleta Hayes (m. 1983; div. 1984); Demetra Harrison (m. 1988; div. 1996); Deann Absolam (m. 1998; div. 2002)
- Children: 2
- Status: Released
- Conviction: Money laundering
- Penalty: Sentenced to 18 months in federal prison and fined $185,000

Kevin Ingram (born c. 1958) is an American bond trader, investment banker, and businessman. In 1992 and 1996, he was included as among the top 25 most successful Black Wall Street executives on Black Enterprise. In 2001, he pled guilty to one count of money laundering in a case related to an arms-trafficking sting, launched by Bureau of Alcohol, Tobacco, Firearms and Explosives (ATF). He was sentenced to 18 months in prison and fined a penalty of $185,000.

== Early life ==
Ingram was born in Philadelphia, Pennsylvania to Nathan Ingram, a former United States Army veteran and real estate appraiser and investor, and Doris Ingram, a volunteer nurse. When Ingram was five years old, his father died from suicide. Following his father's death, his mother took over the family's real estate business.

Ingram attended Central High School, becoming a math prodigy. He later attended Massachusetts Institute of Technology (MIT) where he majored in chemical engineering. He graduated in 1980, and accepted a Western Electric scholarship to study engineering at Stanford University. In June 1981, Ingram left Stanford to work as an engineer. Meanwhile, in February 1982, Ingram was arrested in Sacramento, California, for passing bad checks and committing misdemeanor property theft. Ingram spent five weekends in prison and was placed on a two-year probation. In September 1982, Ingram enrolled into Stanford's Graduate School of Business after learning from a college friend that Wall Street was interested in hiring math-proficient college students. He graduated in 1984.

== Career ==
=== Goldman Sachs ===
Ingram started working at Lehman Brothers as an associate. A week after he started, Lehman was acquired by Shearson/American Express and went public. Determined to remain involved in finance, Ingram moved to Goldman Sachs one year later.

In 1988, Ingram was promoted to vice president, and in 1992, he headed the collateralized mortgage obligation (CMO) derivatives trading desk, supervising several junior bond traders. CMOs began during the 1980s when the mortgage market was in an economic boom. However, because of uncertainty in case a loan cannot be paid off, mortgage investors began developing CMOs by dividing loan and interest payments into new financial securities. Reliant on the collateral pool of mortgage borrowers, these new securities each carry their own different risk equation.

In 1994, Ingram had hoped to become a partner within the firm, thereby garnering an ownership share. However, his promotion was placed on hold, but during the same year, Steven Mnuchin was made partner as his father had worked as an executive at Goldman Sachs. Bitter over Mnuchin's promotion, Ingram told a colleague: "I guess I'm not the chosen one." By this point, his coworkers began noticing he was taking extended, unexplained absences from the office. In 1996, he was again passed over to become a partner, and subsequently resigned from Goldman Sachs. In one of his final emails there, he issued one questioning the firm's perception of itself as an elite meritocracy.

=== Deutsche Bank ===
In April 1996, Ingram was hired by Edson Mitchell to join Deutsche Morgan Grenfell. To help increase the bank's market share in commercial mortgage-backed securities, Ingram served as the managing director over the department. His responsibilities were to structure and issue millions in securities lending for an international clientele including banks, insurance companies, and private individuals with a high net worth. To help build the department, Ingram hired several former colleagues from Goldman Sachs, along with several veteran real estate finance personnel.

By October 1996, Black Enterprise reported Ingram had invested $500 million for Fannie Mae and $100 million for Host Marriott, reportedly the first ever for a hotel company. In 1998, then-businessman Donald Trump had called Ingram's colleague Mike Offit requesting a $125 million loan to renovate 40 Wall Street. Ingram then met with Trump at his office to negotiate the loan; while Ingram had personally opposed the loan, the transaction was made in April 1998. A few months later, Trump won another $300 million loan to construct Trump World Tower.

By January 1998, Ingram had run a large derivatives loss, and the bank was forced to take a significant write-down. Nevertheless, in August 1998, Ingram was promoted to head the bank's global asset securitization department in London. In September, the ongoing Russian financial crisis and the fallout from the Long-Term Capital Management had caused a severe market downturn. In the wake of this, Ingram's department had suffered substantial trading losses.

That same month, Mitchell asked for Ingram's resignation, along with a third of his 120 employees within his department. Angered, and demanding a larger severance settlement, Ingram allegedly told Mitchell: "You are going to have to fire me." Furthermore, Ingram threatened to file a racial discrimination lawsuit, alleging he was being forced out because of his race. To help negotiate a more substantial severance package, Ingram called in Jesse Jackson. He and Jackson both demanded that Deutsche give the former a settlement of $20 million. Ingram eventually settled for an lower undisclosed figure; according to Jackson's close associates, it was reportedly around $6 million.

=== Other ventures ===
In 1999, Ingram ventured into the real estate market, serving as the chief executive of I. W. Development LLC (a real estate developer established in Midtown Manhattan). He announced plans to reopen Minton's Playhouse and to renovate the Wells Famous Home of Chicken and Waffles. Previously, in 1996, one attempt to re-open Minton's, which was spearheaded by celebrities including Robert De Niro and Melba Wilson, had foundered due to the difficulties in securing private investments. The Upper Manhattan Empowerment Zone Development Corporation (UMEZ) had offered I. W. Development a loan package deal of almost one million to renovate both businesses, with Ingram only needing to raise the remaining capital. In 2000, the UMEZ withdrew the offer after Ingram had failed to raise the additional capital. At the time of Ingram's arrest, the Wells renovation was in limbo and Minton's was closed.

In 2000, Ingram founded TruMarkets, a start-up Internet-based trading platform designed to trade securities electronically, along with derivatives and mortgage bonds. Ingram and Peter McCarthy, a former Deutsche Bank trader, pitched the platform to Gary Morgenthaler, a Silicon Valley venture capitalist. Enthused with the idea, Morgenthaler invested $6.2 million into the platform, with an additional $2 million from Ingram's severance pay from Deutsche Bank. The firm hired over 50 employees, attracting prominent clients such as Jon Corzine and Herbert M. Allison as board members. Ingram leased an office across the street from the Empire State Building. Throughout the summer of 2000, TruMarkets had convinced several major financial firms, including Nomura Securities and BlackRock, to use the platform. However, with over $30 million spent in venture capital, the technology was experiencing software defects. Ingram delayed its initial launch date set for July 2000 to the fall, and then to early 2001.

By March 2001, the dot-com crash had devastated TruMarkets, leading the company to file for bankruptcy protection. Ingram was replaced, and the company was subsequently acquired by MortgageSight Holdings LLC, a consortium owned by Salomon Smith Barney, Lehman Brothers, Bear Stearns, and Credit Suisse First Boston.

== Operation Sphinx ==
Operation Sphinx began in 1998, when a confidential informant informed the Bureau of Alcohol, Tobacco, Firearms and Explosives (ATF) that Diaa Mohsen, an Egyptian national, "was involved in illegal arms deals and purchasing arms for other groups." The informant had introduced Mohsen to an undercover ATF agent, in which Moshen explained he wished to acquire U.S. stinger missiles on behalf of a Pakistani intermediary. He would then plan to traffick the missiles to the Taliban and Osama bin Laden. Other international countries were also mentioned as possible recipients.

=== Contacts with Randy Glass and Diaa Mohsen ===
Years earlier, Ingram had met Mohsen in Jersey City. Together, they formed a zoning company called B.I.A. Construction. Mohsen also introduced Ingram to Mohammed Malik, a Pakistani immigrant and deli owner who had been living in the United States. In Atlantic City, Mohsen met Randy Glass, a con artist and jewel smuggler, at the Trump Taj Mahal casino. During his severance negotiations from Deutsche Morgan Grenfell, Ingram was working in the 85th floor on the South Tower within the World Trade Center, in a temporary space offered to him by the law firm Harris Beach. Seeking new business opportunities, Ingram met Glass through Mohsen. In Boca Raton, Florida, aboard Ingram's private yacht the Ingee, Glass presented himself as a wealthy entrepreneur seeking investment advice. Glass stated he had financial partners and businessmen who had "a certain amount of cash coming in every month" that needed cleaning up. Interested, Ingram invited Glass to his office at the South Tower.

In June 1999, Glass and Mohsen went to see Ingram for a follow-up meeting. After discussing preliminary details, Glass handed Ingram over $100,000 in cash to transfer. Ingram then wrote Glass a cheque from a corporate account at Chase Manhattan for $91,000, taking a personal fee of $9,000. Shortly after, Ingram talked about establishing an offshore investment fund with "a minimum investment" of $15 million. Glass replied he and his partners needed to meet with Ingram in order to further discuss future transactions. When Glass and Ingram agreed to become partners, they named their offshore company IAM Global Money Fund.

At the investment pitch in Boca Raton, Glass introduced Ingram to "Ray Spears"—whose real name was Dick Stoltz, an undercover ATF agent. On a whiteboard, Ingram diagrammed how their business would operate, illustrating arrows to display where the monetary transactions would flow from multiple accounts. Ingram proposed launching their business with upwards of between $25 and $30 million, but Glass preferred starting with modest cash amounts. Their next transaction was worth $250,000, in which Ingram helped wire $227,500—subtracting 9 percent for himself.

When Ingram had received his settlement, Glass claimed that Ingram had lost interest when it became apparent that his promises of an imminent investment of millions were, in Ingram's words, "way off." Ingram countered that Glass was "creepy" and untruthful. "When I kind of figured out what was really going on—because they did ask me to launder some money—I stopped talking to them," Ingram stated. For more than a year, Ingram remained unaware that Glass and Mohsen were arms dealers, trafficking Stinger missiles, guns, and grenade launchers stored inside a Florida warehouse.

=== Arrest and sentencing ===
In May 2001, Stoltz (who was using the alias "Ray Spears") contacted Mohsen and told him he had sold weapons from Vietnam and had $16 million to transfer. Mohsen was enthusiastic about helping, but noted that he was not in communication with Ingram. Mohsen explained Ingram's financial troubles following the collapse of TruMarkets, and was acting erratic. He also told of how Ingram "screwed him out of money" after he had tried to sell him on a cell phone business venture. Following the meeting, Mohsen left a message on Ingram's voice mail, telling him to contact Spears.

In June 2001, near a Fort Lauderdale hotel, Ingram had met with Stoltz. Stoltz told Ingram he was expecting to bring in $16 million from arms sales within the next year. Ingram switched conversations, preferring instead to talk about the "long-range plans" involving offshore accounts. Suspicious of infiltration by law enforcement, Ingram asked Stoltz if he was wearing a wire. Stoltz assured Ingram that he had done arms deals before, and wondered if Ingram was still interested. Ingram responded, "I'm a professional and I have a reputation, but I don't mind making money." Following the meeting with Stoltz, Ingram paged him stating he would transport the money to the Netherlands through his private jet. He later stated his asking fee was 25 percent of the sale, including reimbursement of transportation costs.

At the Embassy Suites, Ingram introduced Stoltz to Walter Kapij, a business associate and golfing companion, who would pilot a Learjet parked at a nearby private airport. They obtained the $2.2 million contained in two suitcases from Stoltz. Within an envelope, Ingram was handed a paper containing the name and address of the contact, along with his photo, who was staying at the Royal Lancaster Hotel in London. On June 12, 2001, Ingram and Kapij were arrested in Fort Lauderdale under suspicions of money laundering. Ingram was later released on a $250,000 bond. As part of his bail condition, Ingram surrendered his real estate, his boat, and his 1996 Porsche vehicle.

News of Ingram's arrest had shocked his former colleagues at Goldman Sachs and Deutsche Bank. Corzine told The New York Times that Ingram's arrest was "a tragedy... When I found out, I was shocked. People recruited him and brought him into the business. I'm disappointed." One banker told the New York Observer: "I literally spat my coffee across the table when I read the story."

In July 2001, Ingram was indicted on federal charges of money laundering. Apart from the attempted laundering of $2.2 million, federal authorities accused Ingram of laundering $350,000 in 1999. Ingram was expected to face up to 10 years in prison. In August 2001, Ingram pled guilty to the charge. As part of his plea agreement, Ingram agreed to reimburse the U.S. government $185,000 and to testify against Moshen and Malik. On November 30, Ingram was sentenced to eighteen months in federal prison, and ordered to pay a $20,000 fine. After the sentencing, Ingram offered a brief apology, stating he was sorry he had disappointed his family. He was released from prison in 2004.

Following his prison release, Ingram returned to working in finance and has made investments in the legalized cannabis industry.

== Personal life ==
During his studies at Stanford, Ingram married Aleta Hayes, but a close friend recalled the marriage lasted about a year. In 1988, Ingram next married Demetra Harrison, a Goldman Sachs back-office accountant, in which they had one son. They were divorced by 1996. Before he married Harrison, Ingram had another son with a woman he once lived with in Brooklyn. In September 1998, Ingram married Deann Absolam, a fashion model, who was nicknamed "Sparkle". During his trial conviction hearings, the couple had filed for divorce.
