= Aquatots =

Swimmers Kathy and Russell "Bubba" Tongay

Bubba Tongay
- Born: Russell Tongay; December 21, 1945 (age 80); Florida, United States

Kathy Tongay
- Born: Kathy Tongay; May 22, 1947; Florida, United States
- Died: May 6, 1953 (aged 5); Miami, Florida, U.S.
- Cause of death: Murder (beating)
- Known for: Swimming feats and murder by her father

The Aquatots were American siblings Russell "Bubba" Tongay and Kathy Tongay who performed daring swimming feats at a very young age.

Bubba was seven years old and Kathy was five when the Tongays' father killed Kathy in 1953.

== Early career ==
Russell G. Tongay, the children's father, began training Kathy and Bubba when they were very young. Time magazine reported in 1953 that by the age of ten months, Kathy could swim 20 feet (6.1 m) deep. By the time each of the children reached 17 months old, they were swimming .25 miles (400 m) per day.

In 1950, Tongay staged a swimming performance for his children in the Mississippi River, 22 miles (35 km) from St. Louis. Tongay followed in a boat while his children swam along the river. Kathy, age two, swam five miles (8.0 km) and Bubba, age four, swam the entire distance to St. Louis. The performance was recorded by reporters and served as a national introduction for the two children. Tongay announced that his children would swim across the English Channel.

Following the Mississippi River swim, Tongay began to actively promote the children as an entertainment act and bragged of their diet, which consisted entirely of baby food. Bubba would leap from a 30-foot diving platform and swim underwater with his hands and feet bound. The family later moved to Miami, where the children continued to perform.

== Europe ==
The Tongays arrived in Europe in June 1951, where the act was regarded as abuse rather than entertainment. Upon their arrival in London, the family was placed under "technical arrest" and the British and the French governments forbade Russell Tongay from forcing the children to swim the English Channel. Tongay argued with the British Home Office to permit the swim. Letters to the editor and a general sense that the swim was exploitative caused Home Secretary James Chuter Ede to say: "I cannot help thinking that swimming the Channel at that early age is rather a severe test even for an infant prodigy."

The Home Office initially intended to expel the Tongays from the country, but an officer declared that they could stay for one month provided that the children did not swim for profit. Although the Daily Mail had offered the children a $20,000 prize for the stunt, and they had received much publicity, the Tongays returned to the United States without having performed the swim across the channel.

The publicity continued to increase after the family's return from Europe. The children were featured in newsreels and made a cameo appearance in the 1952 musical film Skirts Ahoy!, starring Esther Williams.

== Death and the end of the Aquatots ==
Kathy and Bubba were both accomplished platform divers. In May 1953, Kathy Tongay attempted to complete a one-and-a-half layout dive from a height of 33 feet (10 m) at Miami's Macfadden-Deauville Pool, but her attempt failed and she bellyflopped. Afterward, she complained of back pain, and her father took her to the Treasure Isle Pool, where the children trained five days a week. A lifeguard at the pool later reported that Kathy was badly bruised and ill. Her father fed her some soup and ordered her to enter the pool even though Kathy was crying. She did not swim for long, and after the Tongays returned home, Kathy went into convulsions and died. Homicide detectives stated that Kathy had apparently been beaten and had died from a ruptured intestine, internal bleeding and an infection. Russell Tongay was charged with second-degree murder but was convicted of manslaughter and sentenced to ten years at hard labor.

== Later life ==
Bubba became a beach-patrol officer in Miami Beach, Florida in his adult years.

== See also ==
- Jessica Dubroff
- List of murdered American children
