= Skirts Ahoy! =

1952 film by Sidney Lanfield

- Original film poster
- Directed by: Sidney Lanfield
- Written by: Isobel Lennart
- Produced by: Joe Pasternak
- Starring: Esther Williams; Joan Evans; Vivian Blaine
- Cinematography: William Mellor
- Edited by: Cotton Warburton
- Music by: Harry Warren; Ralph Blane
- Production company: Metro-Goldwyn-Mayer
- Distributed by: Loew's, Inc.
- Release date: May 28, 1952 (New York City)
- Running time: 109 minutes
- Country: United States
- Language: English
- Budget: $2 million
- Box office: $4 million

Skirts Ahoy! is a 1952 musical film directed by Sidney Lanfield, and starring Esther Williams, Vivian Blaine and Joan Evans. Shot in Technicolor, the film follows several women who join the WAVES with sequences filmed on location at the Great Lakes Naval Training Station. It also features the film debut of Billy Eckstine.

== Plot ==
Three young women who previously have had traumatic emotional experiences decide to change their lives by enlisting in the WAVES. Mary Kate Yarborough, from the Midwest, was jilted by her fiancé. Whitney Young, a socialite from Long Island who has been engaged multiple times, left her fiancé standing at the altar. Una Yancy, from New York City, is determined to track down Archie, her boyfriend in the Navy she has only heard from twice in two years, and be assigned to the same station he is serving in; he last contacted her from Paris. The only thing they have in common is their last names start with the letter Y.

They are sent to the Great Lakes Naval Training Center for WAVE boot camp and are assigned to the same company, becoming roommates. Whitney is named recruit company commander after saving Mary Kate from drowning during swim training. Whitney and Una adapt to the rigors of boot camp; Mary Kate does not, suffering from homesickness to the point she winds up facing an elimination board which can discharge her from the Navy for inadaptability. While Whitney advocates for her, Mary Kate's former fiance shows up and tries to convince her that she will be better with him than in the Navy. Angered by this, she goes before the board and convinces them to allow her to continue in the Navy.

Granted a pass midway through their training, the trio go to Chicago looking for a good time. They quickly learn that, while the sailors have no trouble meeting girls, it is harder for the WAVES to meet guys. On the advice of a waiter, Una and Whitney go to a newly-coed bar in a downtown hotel, where Whitney picks up a man a year or two older. Unbeknownst to her, he is the newly assigned doctor of the WAVE training battalion in civvies. Their cordial dinner is spoiled by three WACs. Young decks all three of them, and is brought before a board of inquiry. She is saved by the testimony of Lt. Dr. Paul Elliot, her date from the night before, who, after the board dismisses her without disciplinary action, rebukes Whitney for her behavior.

Returning to her barracks, Whitney passes the base swimming pool, where a young brother and sister argue. She takes them in hand, and the three of them spend an hour swimming, diving, and playing in the pool. (Note: This sequence is one of the few filmed performances of the Aquatots.)

At a USO dance for personnel of all the services, a precision drill platoon made up of black WAVES puts on a performance. This is followed up by a song and dance number. (Note: Featuring Debbie Reynolds and Bobby Van, introduced by Keenan Wynn.) Una asks Dr. Elliot to dance, and tries to maneuver him to where Whitney is standing. He resists, and Whitney leaves the dance. Her night finishes with her dancing with Pops, the civilian plumber who spends his time trying to keep the barracks plumbing from being clogged by half-eaten all day suckers.

Still attracted to Dr. Elliot, Whitney trails him to a moviehouse one Saturday night. The two hold a whispered discussion about their characters, with Elliot throwing Whitney's history of 12 engagements in her face and her ripping him for his air of superiority in social matters. She storms out of the theater, and a Navy captain whose medals are headed up by the Navy Cross and the Navy Distinguished Service Medal, who had overheard their argument, tells Elliot that he would be a fool to let her get away. Whitney later performs a solo aquatic ballet in the base swimming pool.

Upon graduation of the training company, the trio of new-fledged WAVES is broken up. Mary Kate is assigned to Brooklyn. Una gets the assignment she had hoped for – Paris, France – only to learn that her boyfriend Archie has just been assigned to Great Lakes for a year. Whitney is sent for advanced individual training in Washington, DC before being sent on to an overseas assignment. The men they respectively love meet them at the train station, promising to get assignments so they can be together. The new Seaman Second Class WAVES wave goodbye to their guys as the Twentieth Century Limited takes them to New York.

== Cast ==
- Esther Williams as Whitney Young
- Joan Evans as Mary Kate Yarbrough (singing voice was dubbed by Joan Elms)
- Vivian Blaine as Una Yancy
- Barry Sullivan as Lt. Dr. Paul Elliot
- Margalo Gillmore as Lt. Cmdr. Stauton
- Jeff Donnell as Lt. Giff
- Keefe Brasselle as Dick Hallson
- Billy Eckstine as himself
- Dean Miller as Archie O'Conovan
- The DeMarco Sisters as the Williams sisters
- Juanita Moore as Black Drill Team Member

Bubba and Kathy Tongay, better known as the Aquatots, made a cameo appearance in the movie. Kathy was murdered by their father in 1953; Bobba became a lifeguard in Miami in adulthood.

Debbie Reynolds and Bobby Van made a minor appearance in the film, performing a rendition of "Oh By Jingo!".

== Production ==
In March 1951 MGM announced that Isobel Lennart was writing Skirts Ahoy! for Esther Williams, Vic Damone and Vera-Ellen with Joe Pasternak producing. Williams would make the movie following Texas Carnival.

By July the film was going to star Williams, Sally Forest (replacing Vera Ellen) and Vivian Blaine. Blaine was going to take a leave of absence from the Broadway production of Guys and Dolls. Sidney Lanfield signed to direct. Then Forest was out of the film. Keefe Brasselle replaced Vic Damone.

Filming started August 1951.

== Reception ==
According to MGM records, Skirts Ahoy! earned $2,585,000 in the US and Canada and $1,464,000 overseas, resulting in a profit of $342,000 from a budget of $2,003,000.

A contemporary review of the film in Variety reported that the "plot is an adequate support for the typical musical comedy material most of the time," that "Williams has two okay swim numbers," and that "Barry Sullivan rates the most of the little tossed to the actors in the cast." A review of the film by Hans Wollstein in AllMovie described it as "a noisy, unfunny and at times unintelligible mish-mash" and "the nadir of Esther Williams' career," describing her swimming scenes as "performing with a couple of kids who look as if they belonged in The Village of the Damned and an inflatable beach toy."
