= Tom Longboat =

Canadian distance runner (1886–1949)

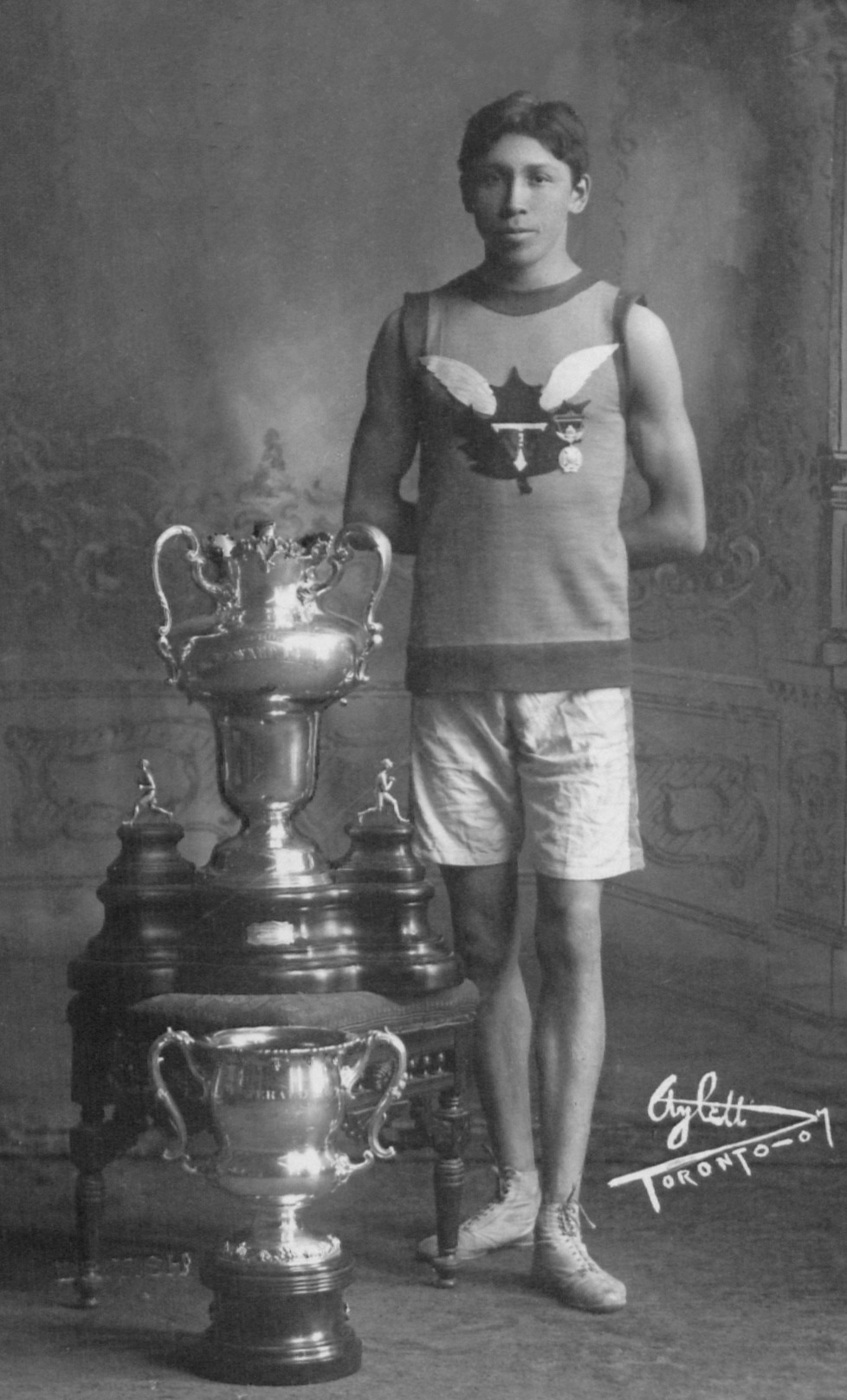
- Tom Longboat with the Ward Marathon Trophy in 1907

Personal information
- Full name: Thomas Charles Longboat
- Born: July 4, 1886 Six Nations Reserve; Brantford, Ontario, Canada
- Died: January 9, 1949 (aged 62) Six Nations Reserve; Brantford, Ontario, Canada
- Height: 1.75 m (5 ft 9 in)
- Weight: 66 kg (146 lb)

Sport
- Sport: Running
- Event: Long-distance
- Club: Brantford

Thomas Charles Longboat (4 July 1886 – 9 January 1949, Iroquois name: Cogwagee) was an Onondaga distance runner from the Six Nations Reserve near Brantford, Ontario and, for much of his career, the dominant long-distance runner. He was known as the "bulldog of Britannia" and was a soldier in the Canadian Expeditionary Force (CEF) during the First World War.

== Athletic history ==
When Longboat was a child, a Mohawk (Kanienʼkehá꞉ka) resident of the reserve, Bill Davis, who in 1901 finished second in the Boston Marathon, interested him in running races. He began racing in 1905, finishing second in the Victoria Day race at Caledonia, Ontario. His first important victory was in the Around the Bay Road Race in Hamilton, Ontario, in 1906, which he won by three minutes. In 1907 he won the Boston Marathon in a record time of 2:24:24 over the old 24 1/2-mile (39.4 km) course, four minutes and 59 seconds faster than any of the previous ten winners of the event. He collapsed in the 1908 Olympic Games marathon, along with several other leading runners. In response to Longboat's performance in the marathon, Canadian team manager J. Howard Crocker reported that Longboat was likely "doped", explaining his collapse and subsequent condition. An Olympic rematch was organized the same year at Madison Square Garden in New York City. Longboat won this race, turned professional, and in 1909 at the same venue won the title of Professional Champion of the World by defeating Dorando Pietri and Alfred Shrubb in front of sell-out crowds.

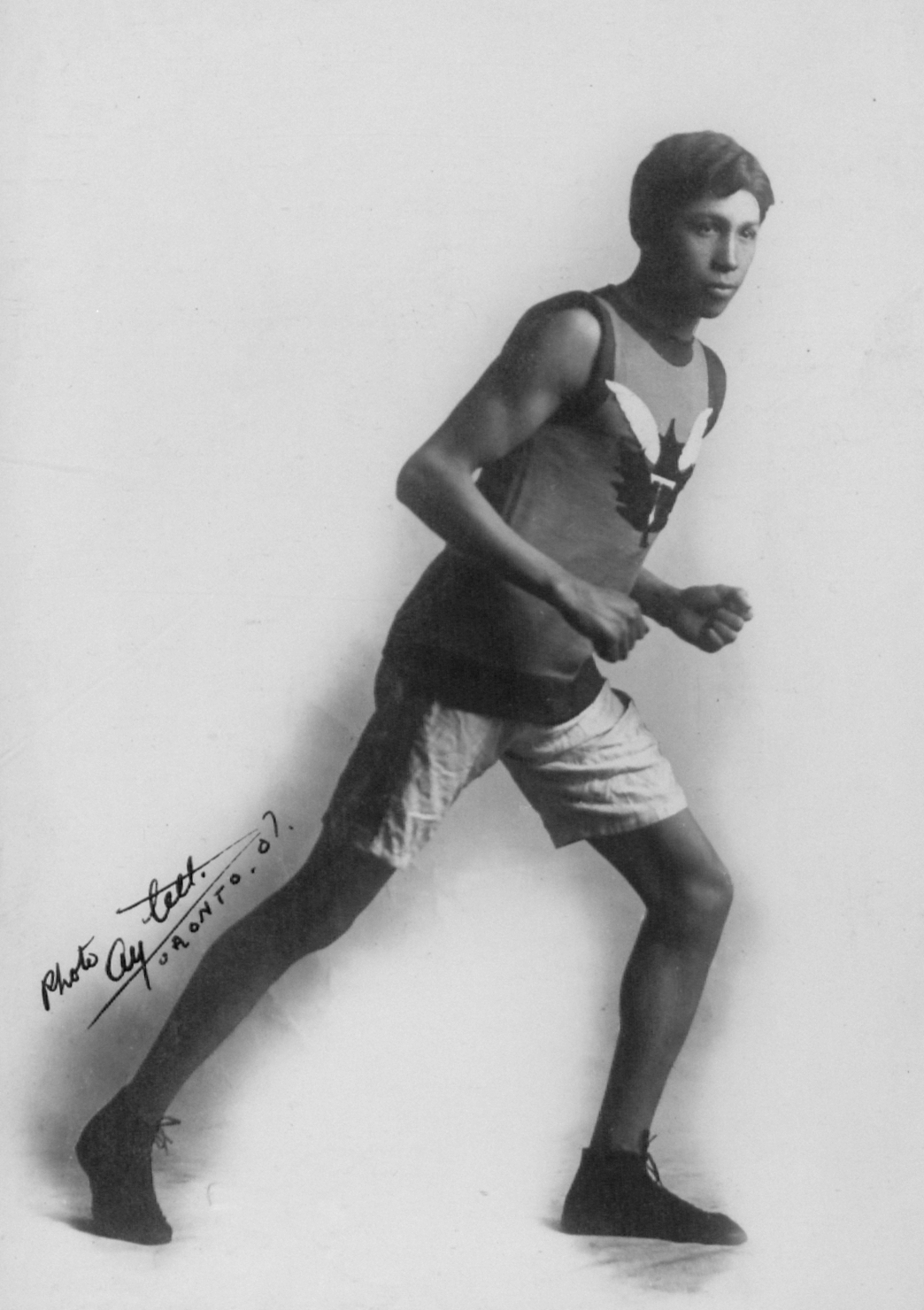
Tom Longboat, 1907

His coaches did not approve of his alternation of hard workouts with "active rest" such as long walks. When he was a professional, these recovery periods annoyed his promoters and the sports press often labelled him "lazy", although the practice of incorporating "hard", "easy", and "recovery" days into training is normal today. Because of this and other disputes with his managers Longboat bought out his contract, after which his times improved.

Knee and back issues began to plague Longboat post-1909. Although this was public knowledge, reporters and fans often blamed "Indian laziness" for his occasional poor showing. Longboat's former manager, Tom Flanagan, spread false rumours that Longboat trained infrequently, contributing to this public attitude of sportswriters towards Longboat. In 1911, he was given a suspended sentence in Toronto for drunkenness, which led to additional criticism from reporters. While many newspaper columns were devoted to his supposed alcoholism, the facts of Longboat's racing career and post-athletic work appear to be in strong contradiction. It has been suggested that efforts to encourage the temperance movement within First Nations may have been the cause of such reporting. Regardless of the intentions behind such coverage, not a month later Longboat won two major races at Hanlan's Point Stadium, setting a personal best in the 12-mile (19 km) race.

Members of his family did not believe how fast he could run over such a long distance until he gave his brother a half an hour head start driving a horse and buggy while he ran on foot, and yet he still made it to Hamilton first.

Longboat's chief rival was Alfred Shrubb, who he raced ten times, winning all the races at 20 miles (32 km) or more and losing all those at shorter distances.

Longboat was a dispatch runner in France in World War I while maintaining a professional career. He was twice wounded and twice declared dead while serving in Belgium. Stories said that he had entered a communication trench which was buried by an exploding shell, where he and his comrades were trapped for six days (albeit with sufficient oxygen and provisions) before being rescued. However, Longboat himself debunked that particular myth in an interview with Lou Marsh in 1919. He retired following the war.

While officially an amateur, Longboat had lost only three total races, one of which was his first, the Victoria Day race. By the time he had turned professional, he owned two national track records and several unofficial world records. After joining the professional ranks, he set world records for the 24- and 32-kilometre races and had nearly set the world record for 19 kilometres.

== Personal life ==
Longboat grew up in a poor family who lived on a small farm. His father died when Longboat was three years old. He was enrolled at the Mohawk Institute Residential School at age 12, a legal obligation under the Indian Act at that time. He hated life at the school, where he was pressured to give up his Onondaga beliefs in favour of Christianity. He was also expected to give up his language. After one unsuccessful escape attempt, Longboat tried again and reached the home of his uncle. His uncle hid him from authorities. After Longboat's athletic successes, he was invited to speak at the institute. He refused: "I wouldn't even send my dog to that place."

At the time of the 1907 Boston Marathon, he was an employee of W. J. Gage & Company. In 1908, he married Lauretta Maracle. In February 1916, he enlisted in the CEF running messages between military posts. While he was serving with the CEF, he fell victim to what would later be termed identity theft. From late 1916 until the summer of 1917, a white Rhode Island-born vaudeville singer, conman and onetime medicine show performer named Edgar Laplante (1888-1944) travelled around America pretending to be him and giving concerts that profited from Longboat's continued celebrity. In August 1917 Laplante arrived in New York City, where he enrolled under Longboat's name as a civilian crewman with the U.S. Army Transport Service. News of Longboat joining this branch of the military generated numerous American newspaper stories, which were illustrated by photographs of Laplante, who looked nothing like the real Longboat. During Laplante's initial voyage aboard the S.S. Antilles, a debate raged in the Brooklyn Daily Eagle regarding whether the real Longboat was in France or serving with the U.S. Army Transport Service. The Brooklyn Daily Eagle sided with the imposter. Eventually, Longboat heard about the impostor's antics and wrote a letter about them, which ended up being quoted in several American newspapers. In his letter he threatened legal action against the impostor. "I am going to have three charges against this man, one for making false statements, second for impersonation, third [for] intent to defraud the public at large."

When erroneous reports reached America that Longboat had been killed in action while serving with the CEF in France, the consequent American newspaper stories were often illustrated by photos of the imposter, Edgar Laplante. On the basis that Longboat really was dead, his wife Lauretta remarried during 1918. Although pleased to find out he had survived, she had no desire to leave her new husband. Longboat later married Martha Silversmith, with whom he had four children. After the war, Longboat settled in Toronto where he worked until 1944. He retired to the Six Nations reserve and died of pneumonia on January 9, 1949.

== Legacy ==
After Longboat's death, Alfred Shrubb stated in an interview that "he was one of the greatest, if not the greatest marathoner of all time."

In 1951, the Tom Longboat Awards were instituted by Jan Eisenhardt. This program, administered since 1999 by the Aboriginal Sport Circle, annually honours outstanding First Nations athletes and sportsmen in each province; national male and female winners are selected from the provincial winners. Longboat was inducted into Canada's Sports Hall of Fame (in 1955), the Ontario Sports Hall of Fame and the Indian Hall of Fame.

Longboat is also commemorated annually by the Toronto Island 10 km race.

In 1976, Longboat was designated a National Historic Person.

In 1978, in honour of Longboat, the Scarborough Board of Education opened the doors to their newest school: Tom Longboat Junior Public School.

Tom Longboat was inducted into the Ontario Sports Hall of Fame in 1996. He was the first person of Native American descent (Onondaga) to win the Boston Marathon, and one of only two Native Americans ever to win it (the other being Ellison Brown, a Narragansett).

A 46-cent first-class postage stamp honouring Longboat was issued by Canada Post on 17 February 2000.

In 2008, the St. Lawrence Neighbourhood Association organized the naming of many lanes in their area of the City of Toronto. A lane south of Longboat Avenue was officially named Tom Longboat Lane in 2013.

In 2008, 4 June was officially declared "Tom Longboat Day" in Ontario with the passage of Bill 120, a Private Member's Bill put forward by MPP Michael Colle.

Google's 4 June 2018 Doodle celebrates the life and legacy of Tom Longboat, and was distributed across Canada and the United States.

Historica Canada released a Heritage Minute about Tom Longboat on June 4, 2022.

== In popular culture ==
Tom Longboat appears as a character in Zoe Leigh Hopkins's 2021 film Run Woman Run, portrayed by Asivak Koostachin.

A fictionalized version of Longboat appears as the long-distance runner in two episodes during season 12 of the CBC Television period drama Murdoch Mysteries, in "Darkness Before the Dawn" parts 1 and 2. At the end of the second episode, the main character who interacts with him says: "I intend to train until I can beat you". Longboat was portrayed by Canadian actor of Oji-Cree descent D'Pharaoh Woon-A-Tai.

== See also ==
- Notable Aboriginal people of Canada
- List of winners of the Boston Marathon
- Edgar Laplante
