= The DeMarco Sisters =

20th-century American singing group

The DeMarco Sisters were an American close harmony singing group of the big-band era who recorded popular music and performed in concerts and on the radio, television, and on film from the 1930s through the 1960s. They first achieved fame as weekly performers on The Fred Allen Show from 1946 to 1949, and were featured singers in the 1952 film Skirts Ahoy! with actress Esther Williams. The group was initially composed of five biological sisters. Music critics have compared their sound and style to that of The King Sisters. They made recordings for Majestic Records and Mercury Records among other labels.

== History ==
The DeMarco Sisters consisted of five sisters originally from Rome, New York: Antoinette (Anne), Jeanette (Gina), Gloria, Terri, and Arlene. Joann Quartuccio-Bean, joined the group from 1949-1953. Later, singer Joyce DeYoung, who also sang as a member of The Andrews Sisters during her career, joined the group in 1955 when Terri married actor Murray Hamilton and left the group.

The DeMarco Sisters were originally a vocal trio consisting of Anne, Gina, and Gloria. Believing in their talent, the DeMarcos' father moved his family from Rome, New York, to an apartment in Bensonhurst, Brooklyn, in the hopes of earning the girls a contract with NBC radio. He managed to squeeze in an impromptu audition for his daughters with an NBC producer, and landed the girls a spot on a 1935 broadcast of Uncle Charlie's Tent Show which was hosted by Loretta Clemens Tupper and her brother Jack Clemens. The girls drew the attention of Paul Whiteman who featured the group on a June 28, 1936 broadcast of Paul Whiteman's Musical Varieties. The trio (billed as "The Three De Marcos" [sic]) was featured in the Vitaphone movie short subject Home Run on the Keys (1937), with Babe Ruth.

Soon after Terri and Arlene joined their sisters to form a quintet. The DeMarco Sisters continued to perform on the radio periodically during the late 1930s and early 1940s. It was not until 1946 though that they achieved wider fame, when they landed a spot as weekly performers on The Fred Allen Show. The girls sang the opening of each show, "Mr. Al-len, Mr. Alll-llennnn", in addition to popular songs of the day. They were paid $1,000 per week for their performance, funds which enabled the family to afford a much larger and nicer apartment in Flatbush, Brooklyn. The girls sometimes performed with tenor Robert White, who was just a child at the time, on the program. White was notably trapped at the DeMarcos' home for four days during the North American blizzard of 1947. The girls' performances on the Allen Show ended after four years in 1949.

The DeMarco Sisters also made guest appearances on several television programs, including The Colgate Comedy Hour, The George Jessel Show, The Jackie Gleason Show, The Kate Smith Show, Texaco Star Theater, What's My Line?, and Ed Sullivan's Toast of the Town. Some of their fellow performers on these programs included Tony Bennett, Nat King Cole and Frank Sinatra. The quintet was also featured in the 1952 Esther Williams film Skirts Ahoy! in which they sang "What Makes a WAVE?" (with Williams) and “What Use Is a Gal Without a Guy.”

== Partial list of recordings ==
=== Albums ===
- The DeMarco Sisters: The DeMarco Sisters with Bud Freeman and His Orchestra (1945, Mercury Records)

=== Singles ===
- It's Been a Long, Long Time (Majestic Records, 1945)
- Doin' What Comes Natur'lly (Majestic Records, 1946)
- Love Me (Majestic Records, 1954)
