= George C. Parker =

American con artist (1860–1937)

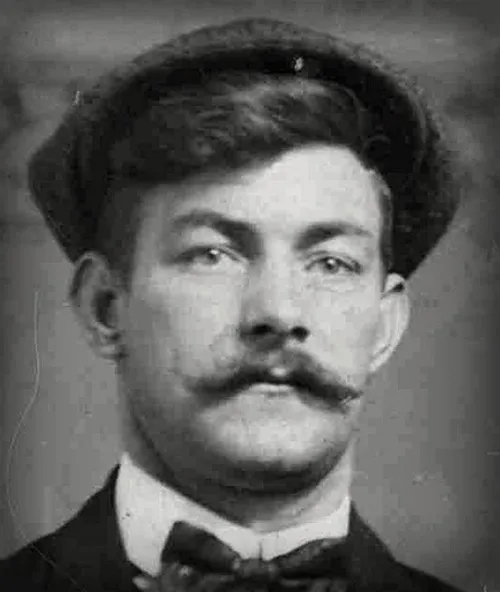
- Born: 16 March 1860; New York City, New York, U.S.
- Died: 9 January 1937 (aged 76); Sing Sing Prison, New York, U.S.
- Other names: James J. O'Brien, Warden Kennedy, Mr. Roberts, Mr. Taylor
- Occupation: Con man
- Criminal charge: Best known for his attempts to "sell" the Brooklyn Bridge.
- Spouse: Elizabeth Parker

George C. Parker (March 16, 1860 – January 9, 1937) was an American con man who conducted an array of illegal sales, mostly of real estate property he did not own, to unwary immigrants. Many of his scams involved several of New York's public landmarks, often using sophisticated tactics to acquire thousands of dollars, with his most notable scams involving the Brooklyn Bridge.

He was arrested several times before his fourth conviction saw him sentenced to life in Sing Sing Prison, where he remained until his death.

== Early life ==
Parker was born on March 16, 1860, to Irish parents, both of whom were immigrants from Northern Ireland who had moved to New York City. Despite being within a large family with four brothers and three sisters, Parker was able to receive a high school education.

== Criminal career ==
=== Brooklyn Bridge scam ===
Parker began conning immigrants after graduating from high school, discovering he had a natural talent for charming others. His first major scam involved finding a gullible mark amongst immigrants arriving into New York City and selling them ownership of the Brooklyn Bridge. For interested parties, the bridge held prominent access to the city's ports, and was amongst the first landmarks to be seen by newcomers to the city—thus making it a lucrative target for con men beside Parker.

Parker's scheme involved conning marks into believing he was the builder and owner of bridges and that the Brooklyn Bridge was his creation, producing convincing forged documents to back his claim. Once the mark was interested, he would stress how hard it was for him to "operate" the bridge and that he would be willing to sell ownership of the bridge to another. Gullible victims would often be made to pay a sizable amount of money for the bridge, amounting to thousands of dollars, to become its new owner, whereupon most victims would attempt to recoup their money by establishing a toll on those who needed to cross it. The deceit of the deal was not known to Parker's marks until the city's police moved in to stop them setting up toll booths upon the bridge and revealed the truth after witnessing their bizarre behaviour with the bridge.

The scam continued on for several years, until the authorities noticed a pattern to the stories his victims told them, whereupon they eventually took measures to shut down further attempts by any and all con men to use the Brooklyn Bridge in their schemes.

=== Scams with New York landmarks ===
The success of the Brooklyn Bridge scam led to Parker venturing out and using other notable landmarks around the city, incorporating them into new scams upon gullible marks, often immigrants found for him by the Ellis Island ferrymen whom he had bribed. One such scheme involved Grant's Tomb, in which Parker posed as the grandson of Ulysses S. Grant and claimed he could not finish the tomb without an investment of capital from the mark. Other landmarks he used included the original Madison Square Garden, the Metropolitan Museum of Art, and the Statue of Liberty.

Many of his criminal activities saw him become more sophisticated in his methods, including using real offices, and even selling empty property lots and the rights to successful shows and plays, all of which he did not own, to the unsuspecting. To facilitate his activities, Parker made use of a variety of different aliases, including James J. O'Brien, Warden Kennedy, Mr. Roberts and Mr. Taylor.

== Arrests, imprisonment, and death ==
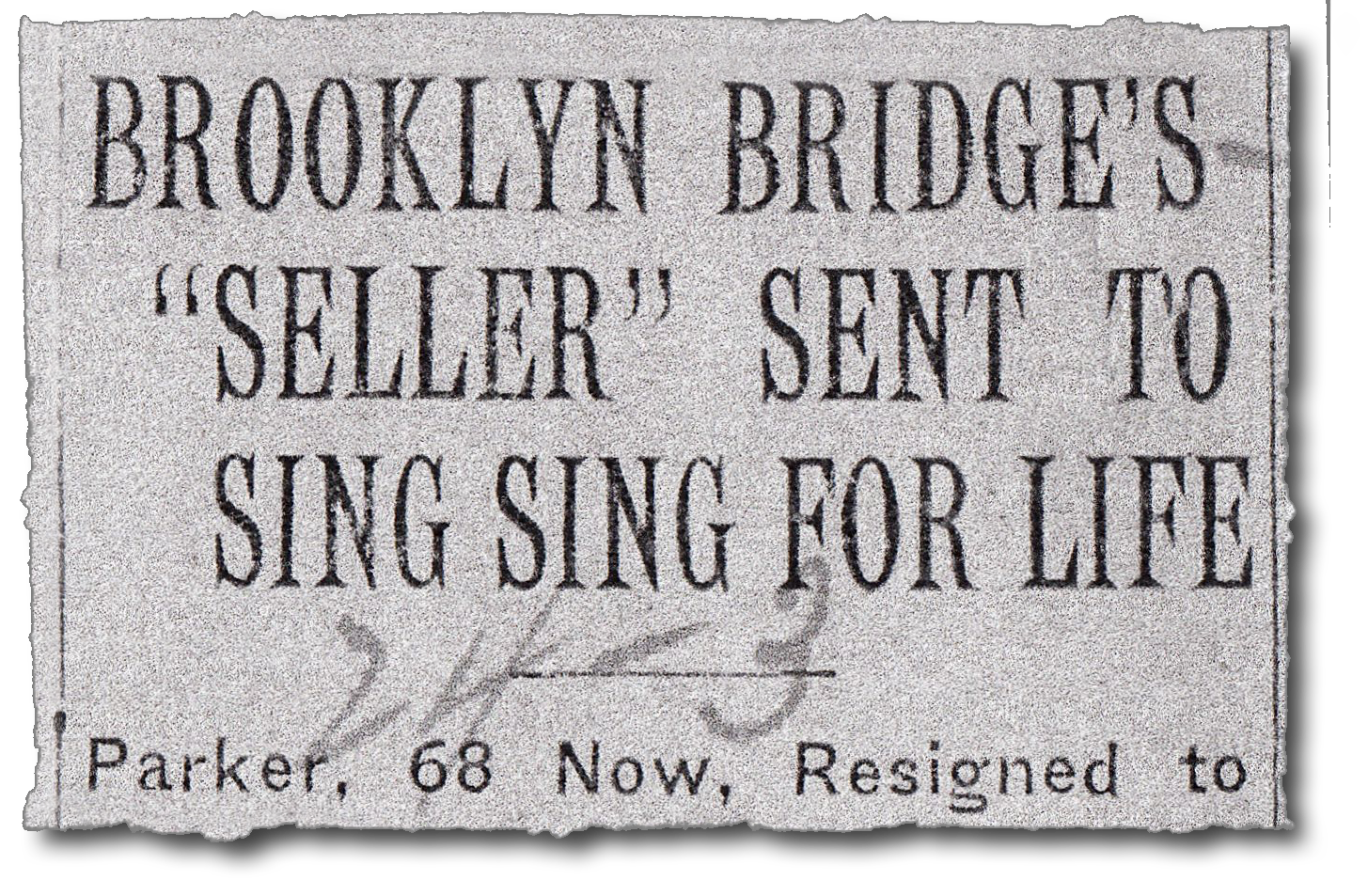
A snippet of a newspaper article detailing Parker being sent to prison for life

Despite his success with his scams, Parker was arrested and convicted three times of fraud, but only served two prison sentences in full at Sing Sing Prison. His third, in 1908, saw him escape from jail by donning a sheriff's hat and coat, which had been set down by a sheriff who had walked in from the cold weather outdoors.

Parker was eventually arrested by police a fourth time, after he attempted to cash a cheque that he had forged in 1928. By this time, the state of New York had established an anti-crime statute known as Baumes law, in which anyone convicted of a crime more than three times would receive life imprisonment. On December 17, 1928, at Kings County Court, Parker was sentenced to a mandatory life term at Sing Sing Prison.

Parker spent much of the remaining eight years of his life regaling the prison guards and inmates with tales of his exploits, before his death in 1937. His exploits became notable in giving rise to the American phrase "and if you believe that, I have a bridge to sell you" - which often insinuates that someone is gullible.

== See also ==
- William McCloundy
- Victor Lustig
