= Susanna Mildred Hill =

Susanna Mildred Hill was an American confidence trickster who fooled potential suitors. In the 1940s, as a 60-year-old mother, posing as a beautiful young woman in her twenties, she was able to convince hundreds of men to send numerous gifts to their "pen-pal". This confidence trick has since become known as the "Lonely Hearts Scam".

== See also ==
- Romance scam
