= Edgar Laplante =

American-Indian confidence trickster, actor

- Edgar Laplante, posing as Chief White Elk, 1918
- Born: c. 1888; Central Falls, Rhode Island, U.S.
- Died: January 1944 (aged 55–56); Arizona, U.S.
- Other names: Chief White Elk; Capo Cervo Bianco; Prince Tewanna Ray
- Occupations: Confidence trickster, Actor
- Spouse: Burtha Thompson

Studio photo taken in 1921

Edgar Laplante (c. 1888 – January 1944), sometimes posed as Chief White Elk, (Note: Chief White Elk was the chief or leader of the Cherokee Nation) and, in Italy, Capo Cervo Bianco (Chief White Buck) was an American-born French-Canadian con man and actor known for his confidence tricks such as duping local businessmen, befriending world class leaders, and seducing high class women by posing as American war heroes and long-distance runners (including Tom Longboat). He also used to involve these contacts in his substance abuse. He performed his first con at an apparent age of 14.

He was able to make money by delivering public speeches at religious places and civil societies while disguised as other people, never revealing his real name.

== Biography ==
He was born around 1888 in Central Falls, Rhode Island. His father was a carpenter. He also went by the name "Prince Tewanna Ray". When he was around 34 years old, he went to England to arrange a meeting with Edward VIII leaving behind a trail of unpaid bills and an active police investigation. He first played Native American characters around 1917 and used to travel from one city to another pretending to be an activist working towards "Indian Rights". In this guise he would also deliver motivational speeches to businessmen and soldiers. He knew more than 21 languages which he used to indulge leaders, businessmen, kings, and queens.

He later went to Switzerland where he was arrested by the Swiss police for his involvement in confidence tricks. He was sentenced to one year in prison. In October 1925 when he was released, he then went to Italy where he was arrested again and sentenced to seven years in prison with a fine of over 1 million Italian lira, however he was released after four years.

=== Cons ===
Prior to his arrest, he went to Europe where he acted in a film titled La caravane vers l’Ouest under the pseudonym Chief White Elk. In 1924, he went to Italy and presented himself as a delegation member of the League of Nations. His traditional dress made him famous in Italy, and earned him honour from the fascist rulers of Italy. Later in 1926, he was convicted by a court in Turin for his involvement in fraud. According to apocryphal claims he tried to justify his actions with the argument that "I'm an actor, I just did what people expected me to do".

== Personal life ==
His pose as Chief White Elk helped him to marry a Utah woman named Burtha Thompson. His marriage was attended by the governor, who believed he was the real Chief White Elk. Along with his spouse, he visited the US and Canada, but he subsequently left his wife due to his substance abuse.

== Death ==
He moved to New York after his release from Italian prison and died of a myocardial infarction in Arizona.
