= North American Medical Management =

North American Medical Management (NAMM) develops and manages provider networks, offering a full range of services to assist physicians and other providers in their managed care and business operations. In business since 1993, NAMM is an innovator in health care with a track record for quality, financial stability, extraordinary services and superior electronic capabilities.

Independently contracted physician networks managed by NAMM include the following: ·PrimeCare Chino Valley ·PrimeCare of Citrus Valley ·PrimeCare of Corona ·PrimeCare of Hemet Valley ·PrimeCare of Inland Valley ·PrimeCare of Moreno Valley ·PrimeCare of Redlands ·PrimeCare of Riverside ·PrimeCare of San Bernardino ·PrimeCare of Sun City ·PrimeCare of Temecula ·Valley Physicians Network ·Primary Care Associates ·Mercy Physicians Medical Group, Inc. ·Redlands Family Practice Medical Group, Inc. ·Coachella Valley Physicians

Originally, NAMM was founded in Houston, Texas by president Herb Fritch. In 1995, NAMM was sold to publicly traded company PhyCor Inc. of Nashville, TN. PhyCor filed for bankruptcy in 2002, but the filing did not include NAMM's operations. This allowed the company to keep the name and reemerge as a subsidiary of a newly founded company, Aveta, Inc., in that same year. Aveta was a new company with no affiliation to PhyCor or the original NAMM leadership. NAMM is a subsidiary of Aveta out of Fort Lee, New Jersey.
