= The Four Shades of Rhythm =

American R&B group

The Four Shades of Rhythm were an American R&B group formed in Cleveland, Ohio, in 1938. Established in a hotbed for R&B musicians, the Four Shades of Rhythm are generally considered the first group to emerge from the scene. After singer and drummer Oscar Lindsay reshuffled the group's line-up in the 1940s, the Four Shades of Rhythm performed and recorded in Chicago. At least seven singles were released during their career.

== History ==
The original line-up of the Four Shades of Rhythm was formed in central Cleveland, Ohio when Oscar Lindsay (vocals, drums), Willie Lewis (guitar), Sims London (piano), and Macon Sims (bass guitar) came together as a quartet in 1938. All of the members were neighborhood friends who worked on the city circuit, honing a large repertoire of traditional pop standards, show tunes, and jazz during the Second World War. "Cleveland, Ohio was a rich source of R&B groups", wrote music historian Marv Goldberg, "Possibly the first, however, was the 4 Shades of Rhythm". By the end of the war, the Four Shades of Rhythm had broken up, but Lindsay subsequently brought together a new group with June Cobb (bass guitar) Oscar Pennington (guitar), and Eddie "Bones" McAfee (piano) to continue performing under the same name.

In 1946, the group was signed to an extended residency in Chicago, but Cobb, who had no interest in leaving Ohio, was replaced by Eddie Meyers. There, the line-up performed regularly together, bringing themselves to the attention of Jack Buckley and Lloyd Garrett, owners of Vitacoustic Records, in 1947. Over the course of December, Vitacoustic recorded the Four Shades of Rhythm at two sessions. Finally, in January 1948 the label issued "One Hundred Years from Today" for the quartet's debut single, highlighted by a lead vocal performance by McAfee.

However, Vitacoustic owed money to Egmont Sonderling, the owner of United Broadcasting Studio, and was forced to disband in September 1948. Sonderling took control of the company's master tapes, including recording by the Four Shades of Rhythm. He subsequently established Old Swing Master Records in 1949 to recoup some of the financial losses from his association with Vitacoustic; three singles by the group were released on the label during that year. Unfortunately, the technical aspects and the distribution strategy for the records resulted in poor sales.

Pennington left the Four Shades of Rhythm late in 1949 and was replaced by Adam Lambert, a former member of the R&B group the Cats N' Jammers. Booker Collins, a former sideman for Floyd Smith, also joined the group following Meyer's departure in 1951. Not long after Collins joined the Four Shades of Rhythm, the group recorded 16 sides at C. H. Bomgardner's Custom Sound Recordings in Evanston, Illinois which were later uncovered by the Red Saunders Research Foundation in 2007. Pianist Ernie Harper replaced McAfee by the time the Four Shades of Rhythm started recording sessions with Chance Records in September 1952: a different version of "Yesterday", a song originally released by Old Swing Masters, was issued the same year.

The group resurfaced on record again in 1957, having their "Ghost of a Chance" single issued on Thomas "Mad Man" Jones' Mad Records. One final single credited to the Four Shades of Rhythm, but most likely a Lindsay solo effort, featured a remake of "A Hundred Years from Today" with string arrangements. It appeared on Apex Records in January 1960, shortly before the group disbanded.
