= William McCloundy =

William McCloundy (born 1859 or 1860), also known as I.O.U. O'Brien, was an early 20th-century confidence trickster, from Asbury Park, New Jersey, who served a two-and-a-half-year prison term in Sing Sing for "selling" the Brooklyn Bridge to a tourist in 1901.

== See also ==
- Brooklyn Bridge § Culture — other information about selling the Brooklyn Bridge
- George C. Parker
