= Jerry Tarbot =

American conman

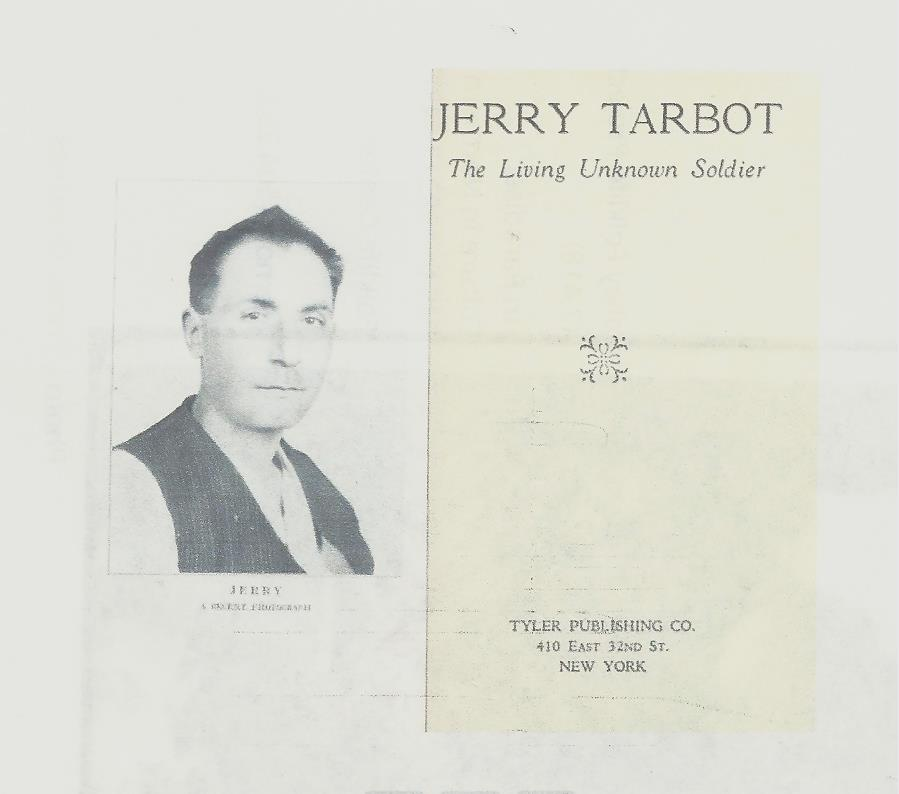
- "Jerry Tarbot"
- Born: Alexander Dubois Jr. May 31, 1882; New York City, New York
- Died: January 4, 1972 (aged 89); San Diego, California
- Other names: Howard Francis Noble; Howard Noble; Blake; Jerry Tarbot; The Sliding Ghost; Jerry J Martin
- Occupations: factory worker; bigamist; car thief; confidence man; swindler, author;
- Known for: Imposter

Jerry Tarbot was an American conman who claimed he was an amnesia victim of World War I. On April 10, 1926, The Healdsburg Tribune published on article/photograph on Tarbot calling him the "sliding ghost" of World War I.

In 1927 he was exposed as a fraud before the U.S. House of Representatives veterans legislative committee by Department of Justice investigators. Investigation began after a bill was introduced in Congress by California Representative Carter to compensate "Tarbot" as a veteran. The investigators stated that "Tarbot" was in fact Alexander Dubois Jr., described as a draft dodger, car thief and wife deserter with more than twenty aliases in Pennsylvania and Michigan, who was stealing cars in California at the time he claimed he was in France.

== Timeline ==
In March 1927 Congressman Royal Johnson of South Dakota Chairman of the Veterans Committee claimed what was the real story of "Tarbot":

- His real name was Alexander Dubois Jr. the son of a chef in a Cuban hotel and Mary Richards Riley and had an aunt in New York named Riley.
- He had 20 aliases.
- He was a draft dodger.
- In January 1913 under the alias of "Howard Francis Noble" he applied for a job with General Electric Company in Erie, Pennsylvania
- In 1915 and 1916 he was known as "Howard Noble" in Sharon, PA and resided in Sharon Pa from June 1916 to July 1917. and was working at the Briggs Seabury Company, in Sharon, PA ^
- In 1916 he was working in the Goodyear Tire & Rubber Co at Akron, Ohio.
- He had married at least twice:
  - In Schenectady, New York to a first wife.
  - That after working in the American Car and Foundry Company in Detroit, Michigan he met Flora Lange and that he married her under the name "Harold Noble" in Toledo, Ohio December 22, 1917. And that after living in Erie, Pennsylvania there was a divorce after domestic trouble and that she last heard from "Noble" in 1918 when he claimed not to be responsible for her debts. They were divorced in January 1918
- In 1922 he was arrested in San Francisco for auto theft under the alias of "Blake". ^; that his attorneys had him declared insane and placed in an asylum where he posed as an amnesiac war veteran ^
- In 1928 he published his alleged life story: Jerry Tarbot The Living Unknown Soldier.
- In 1932 Tarbot was a resident of Santa Rosa, California
- In January 1956 Tarbot renewed the copyright of “Jerry Tarbot The Living Unknown Soldier” under the name Jerry J Martin
