= Riley Shepard =

American country musician, songwriter, and folk music archivist

Richard Riley Shepard (October 21, 1918 – November 6, 2009) was an American country musician, songwriter, and folk music archivist.

For much of his life, Shepard was an accomplished confidence trickster and used a variety of stage names and pseudonyms, primarily to evade his creditors and break the terms of his recording contracts.

== Early life ==
Shepard was born in Wilmington, North Carolina. As a teenager, he began his career as a radio performer on WPTF and WBT. In the late 1940s, he joined the cast of Hayloft Hoedown, a radio show produced in Philadelphia. During this period, his recordings were issued on several labels, including Musicraft, King, and Majestic.

== Encyclopedia of Traditional Music and Folk Songs ==
In the 1960s, Shepard relocated to California, and embarked upon a decades-long project to develop a comprehensive encyclopedia of folk music. By 1976, he had single-handedly catalogued and coded more than 43,000 folk songs, along with their derivative works and variant lyrics. His comprehensive cross-referencing scheme demonstrated that the 43,000 titles originate from just 4,000 songs, texts and tunes.

Despite several attempts, Shepard failed to find a publisher for the encyclopedia, but he continued collecting and categorizing the material. After his death in 2009, the manuscripts were stored by an early investor in Porterville, California, and later Shepard's work, including research books and other materials, were stored by a friend of one of the investors, who gave it to Shepard's daughter, Stacya Silverman in 2019.

Stacya Silverman was contacted by Internet Archives, and the work is now available online. Portions of the material are also held at the Library of Congress.

== Popular media ==
Shepard was the subject of an episode of Hidden Brain on NPR, during which his daughter discussed his activities and colorful personality with host Shankar Vedantam.
