= Daniel Levey =

American fraudster

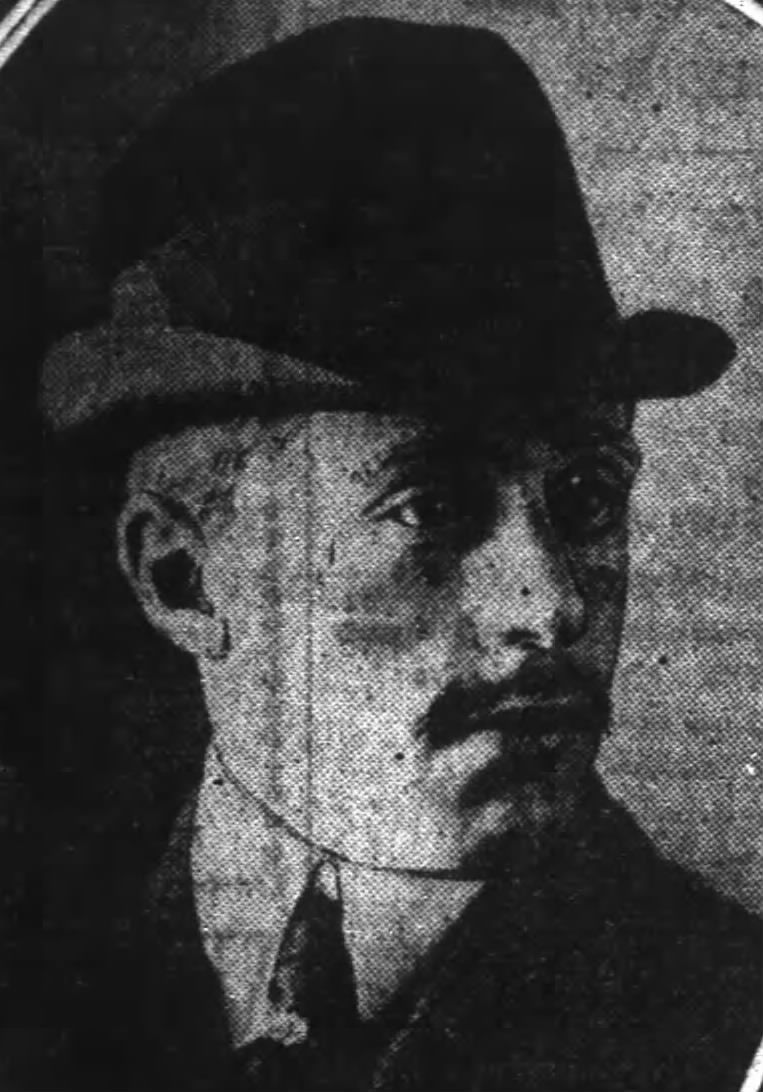
- Levey, using his most common alias of Henry Lewis, in 1902
- Born: c. 1875
- Other names: "Professor" Dan Levey, "Red" Levey, David Lewis, Harry L. Lewis, Harry B. Clark, Harry D. Clark, Harry Levy, Harry Harvey, and possibly Henry D. Clark.
- Spouse: Gertude Hechinger Mendels Levey
- Criminal charges: Embezzlement, fraud, passing back checks, grand larceny

Daniel "Professor Dan" Levey (born c. 1875) was a 19th and 20th century American criminal, operating in Maryland, New York, Pennsylvania, Massachusetts, Oregon and California. He was a forger, embezzler, con artist, thief, gambler, body builder, physical trainer, and womanizer.

Levey used many aliases, including "Red" Levey, David Lewis, Harry L. Lewis, Harry B. Clark, Harry D. Clark, Harry Levy, Harry Harvey, and possibly Henry D. Clark. He was born about 1875 to a respectable Brooklyn family, and his brothers were involved in legitimate and successful businesses. His first victims were his own relatives, followed by thefts from others in Brooklyn and Manhattan. He served short stints in Elmira and Sing Sing for those early crimes.

However, he gained his greatest notoriety in Baltimore. He had started enjoying an establishment life there, marrying a wealthy divorcee, and starting a personal service business catering to the wealthy. Nevertheless, in a short period of time, he started committing crimes and disappeared, setting off a one month manhunt nationwide before being caught. In that time, he managed to raise his financial fortunes enough that he thought he might be able to return to the Baltimore society life he had begun enjoying. He was convicted of forgery in 1916 and spent over four years in prison.

Upon release, he continued his criminal ways.

== Activities in Baltimore ==
When he appeared in Baltimore in early 1900, he took the title Professor, as a "physical culture instructor," a term used for athletics and physical fitness at the time. He made wagers on the abilities of Bernard Byrnes, who was later employed in Levey's gymnasium.

Levey married Gertrude Heching Mendels in June 1901. It was her second marriage, having divorced six months earlier from Emanuel Mendels, scion of a clothing manufacturing family. Mrs. Levey had her daughter's name changed from Mildred Lenore Mendels to Mildred Lenore Levey, a change she later had legally retracted.

Soon after, Levey borrowed money, much of it from his wife's family, to open a business that included gym facilities, a barbershop, and Victorian-style Turkish baths. It was a fashionable, high-end club, with $15,000 (1901 dollars) invested in it. Levey attracted a lot of attention with the business and developed a well-off clientele. He was advertising for additional help shortly after opening in August.

He also spent lavishly on personal items and was a backer of sports competitions, including wrestling and horse racing during this period, and was an involved spectator at such events.

However, by the beginning of the next year, he had developed significant financial problems, and got involved in some shady deals. Later reports indicated that he may have lost much of his money gambling on horses. On Saturday, January 4, 1902, he committed two crimes. He forged his brother's name on a Brooklyn check or bill of exchange, which bounced after being cashed at a local bank, and stole jewelry from a pawn shop, on a pretense of brokering a sale of the goods. That evening, he ran off for several days with his cashier and bookkeeper, Emma Kaufman, and sent word to Mrs. Levey that he was away unexpectedly on business. By Wednesday, the pawn shop and bank filed complaints against him, and his brother-in-law requested a receiver be appointed to keep the gym going. Police began a manhunt for him.

Miss Kaufman reappeared on Tuesday, with information that she thought Levey had headed for Chicago, though she denied romantic involvement with him.

== On the lam ==
It took over a month to find Levey. In that time, he made his way to San Francisco and Oakland, California, winning and losing a fortune betting on horses. He left having ownership of two race horses and $41,000 from horse racing payouts, a huge sum at the time. By the time he had left, bookmakers were looking to have him arrested for repaying money he borrowed to make some of his debts, via bad checks. Levey slyly hired as bodyguards the same detective agency the bookies and police used, thus escaping them.

In the meantime, Baltimore creditors petitioned the court system to declare the Levey businesses bankrupt, and were granted the motion within a few days. It quickly went from a local case to Federal bankruptcy oversight.

Baltimore police kicked off a nationwide manhunt on January 11. By January 16 and 17, Brooklyn and New York (Manhattan) police had respectively matched him to a teenage criminal who had been sentenced to state prison half a decade earlier. His New York arrest record included:

- Passing bogus checks on his brother, 1893; sent to Elmira Reformatory for one year
- Bicycle theft (larceny), 1897
- Bad checks and jewelry theft, 1897-1898; similar to the Baltimore pawn shop case, he pretended to have a buyer for a jewelers goods, but ran off with them instead. Sentenced to three years, but apparently paroled by 1900
- Served two prison terms total before arriving in Baltimore

Police followed leads in Fort Worth and Philadelphia, but Levey managed to elude them each time, though some sightings may have been false.

Gertrude Levey disassociated herself from her husband's activities, and assisted the police in locating him. She lured him to Broadway and Cortlandt Street in New York, where he was arrested on charges of forgery and embezzlement on February 6. He had $41,000 in cash with him, in $100, $500, and $1,000 denominations, a small fortune for the time. Some found his holdings to be persuasive of his abilities and uprightness,

=== Wife's ruse ===
Gertrude Levey was intimately involved in the capture of her husband, working closely with Baltimore Captain of Detectives Aquilla J. Pumphrey.

Levey's marriage to Gertrude was not a just a calculated financial and status move, he was genuinely infatuated with her. He treated her well throughout the marriage, and bought her presents and acted affectionately until hours before his January 4, 1902 disappearance. He initially refused to believe his wife was complicit in his capture.

Levey had written his wife in mid-January from California, expressing a wish to rejoin her, but without leaving a forwarding address. He informed her that he had enough money to keep her living in luxury for the rest of their lives.

Pumphrey and Mrs. Levey worked out a plan to send letters to Levey's mother, assuming he would be in contact with her. (Levey stated that he came to New York to win back his family, and particularly to show that he would never disgrace his elderly mother, whose confidence he had always retained.)

Levey received his wife's letter, and sent an agent named Rosenthal to make arrangements. Mrs. Levey asked him to tell her husband that she would a call him at a precise time. She called a telephone located at in Brooklyn, and asked to speak to him. Brooklyn Police were waiting for him at Court and Warren Streets.

After her husband's capture, Gertrude Levey renounced any future connection to him. Though he sent additional letters to her asking to meet, she refused to see him or even to communicate indirectly. She sued for divorce for his cheating on her with Emma Kaufman, also known as Emma Levey during the episode. The divorce was granted September 27, with credence given to the claims of infidelity. On October 17, she filed a legal petition to revert to her maiden name of Gertrude Hechinger. She could not bear herself or her daughter being called Levey. Her petition was granted on November 25, over the objections of Emanuel Mendel, who wished his daughter to have her original name.

In April, 1907, she married a third time, to Artie Summerfield. He was two years her senior. Her daughter, who had also briefly carried the name Levey, also adopted the name Summerfield. Midlren Lenore Summerfield was married to Abram Watner in April, 1917.

(Mrs. Levey's account of the arrest location differs from initial newspaper accounts of the arrest. Some of the street names are cognate. Mrs. Levey's description is consistent with her husband being in contact with his mother in Brooklyn, whereas the initial newspaper reports have the arrest taking place in Manhattan.)

== Prosecution ==
The grand jury handed down an indictment on February 8.

The return to Baltimore was delayed by extradition proceedings. He was willing to go there without extradition, believing erroneously that Maryland authorities would not press charges if he attempted to right his wrong. However, despite his willingness to go, New York State law required formal extradition to transfer prisoners out of state. He was finally remanded to Baltimore on February 11.

The case was scheduled to begin in Judge Ritchie's courtroom on March 6. Emma Kaufman was the chief prosecution witness in the trial. Levey was convicted of three counts of forgery on the first day. His lawyer did not offer a defense, arguing that the state had simply not proven its case. Sentencing was suspended as the defense attorney moved for a new trial. He was sentenced on March 25, 1902 to 5 years in prison.

== Aftermath ==
The bankruptcy receiver began advertising the sale of the Levey business on February 14. It was sold at auction on February 25 for a fraction of the value invested in it.

Maryland's Governor Warfield received a petition in October 1904 to pardon Levey, with the support of his creditors, on the assumption that he would enter the Brooklyn family business and pay back his debt. However, after serving his full term, with the standard 10 months off for good behavior, Daniel Levey was released May 25, 1906.

It only took about two years for him to be on the run from the police again. In July 1908, New York police asked Baltimore police to be on the lookout for Levey, who had skipped bail on a grand larceny charge.

In 1909, he was extradited from Alberta, Canada to face charges in Oregon. He was sentenced to two years for passing bad checks. Upon release, he was immediately taken into custody by New York detectives. Trading on some minor notoriety his then-wife had gained in a contest, he had come up with a scheme around 1907 to charge applicants a fee to join non-existent vaudeville companies.

In September 1916 he was arrested in Massachusetts for a forgery of $3,500 he committed in Pittsburgh. Other forgery charges were also filed for forgeries in Baltimore and elsewhere. The total amount he obtained was $14,000 or $15,000. Authorities had been tracing his movements for a year and a half through Baltimore, Washington, Pittsburgh, Albany, and Pittsfield. He had also stolen four cars valued at $10,000. He was 40 years old at the time and had spent a total of 15 years behind bars. In the 1916 case, he had taken off with thousands of dollars of stock certificates that he was supposed to be selling on behalf of his employers.
