= Prosečné =

- Municipality
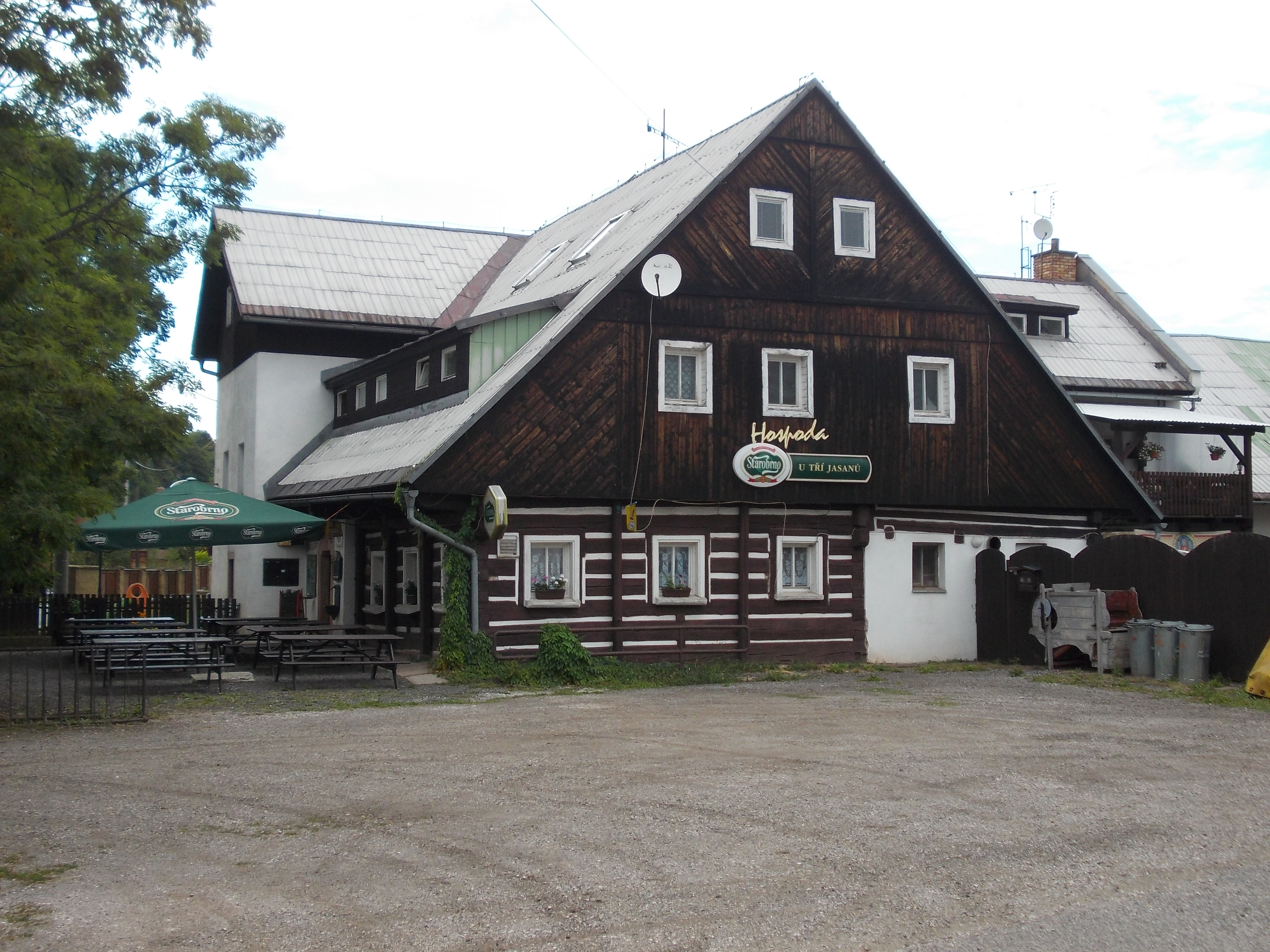
- A pub in Prosečné

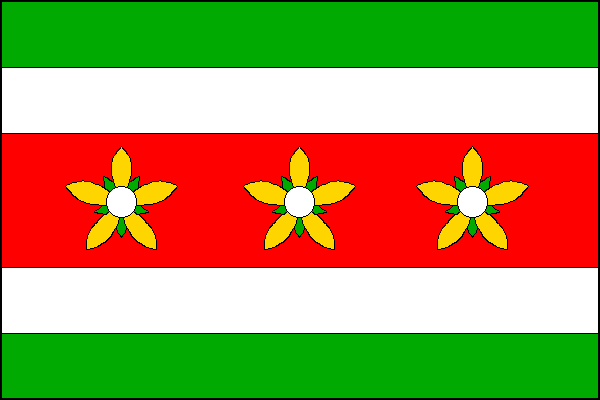
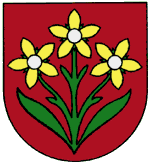
- Flag Coat of arms

- Location in the Czech Republic
- Coordinates: 50°33′43″N 15°41′15″E
- Country: Czech Republic
- Region: Hradec Králové
- District: Trutnov
- First mentioned: 1437

Area
  - Total: 8.35 km^{2} (3.22 sq mi)
- Elevation: 378 m (1,240 ft)

Population (2026-01-01)
  - Total: 586
  - Density: 70.2/km^{2} (182/sq mi)
- Time zone: UTC+1 (CET)
  - Summer (DST): UTC+2 (CEST)
- Postal code: 543 73
- Website: www.obecprosecne.cz

Prosečné is a municipality and village in Trutnov District in the Hradec Králové Region of the Czech Republic. It has about 600 inhabitants.

== Demographics ==
Historical population
Year	Pop.	±%
1869	952	—
1880	1,022	+7.4%
1890	1,083	+6.0%
1900	1,101	+1.7%
1910	1,063	−3.5%
1921	956	−10.1%
1930	907	−5.1%
1950	587	−35.3%
1961	587	+0.0%
1970	567	−3.4%
1980	573	+1.1%
1991	558	−2.6%
2001	542	−2.9%
2011	555	+2.4%
2021	587	+5.8%
Source: Censuses
