= Victor Lustig =

Austro-Hungarian con artist (1890–1947)

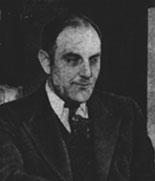
- Lustig in 1935
- Born: 4 January 1890; Hostinné, Bohemia, Austria-Hungary (now Czech Republic)
- Died: 11 March 1947 (aged 57); Springfield, Missouri, U.S.
- Other names: Count Lustig; Robert Miller; Robert Duval
- Occupation: Confidence artist
- Criminal charge: Scamming
- Criminal penalty: 20 years imprisonment
- Criminal status: Died in prison

Victor Lustig (German pronunciation: [ˈvɪktoːɐ̯ ˈlʊstɪç]; 4 January 1890 – 11 March 1947) was a con artist from Austria-Hungary, who undertook a criminal career that involved conducting scams across Europe and the United States during the early 20th century. Lustig is widely regarded as one of the most notorious con artists of his time, and is infamous for being "the man who sold the Eiffel Tower twice" and for conducting the "Rumanian Box" scam.

== Early life ==
Lustig was born in Hostinné, at the time more widely known by its German name Arnau (an der Elbe), part of the Kingdom of Bohemia, Austria-Hungary, as the second of three children, to Ludwig and Amelia "Fanny" Lustig. Raised in a German-speaking middle-class Catholic family, Lustig grew up in a four-room house at Tyrsovy street, near the central market square. Lustig's father was a tobacco goods salesman and at one point a mayor of Hostinné, who was reportedly physically abusive towards his children and wife, who was fifteen years his junior. At age eight, Lustig was forced to sign a written oath to abstain from alcohol and always attend church. Lustig also had to attend violin lessons, which he hated, and during an argument over this, his father beat Lustig over the head with the instrument. His parents divorced around 1898, although they still lived together during the 1900 census.

As a child, Lustig frequently travelled across Europe with his father on business trips to Prague and Zurich, recalling that seeing Paris for the first time at age seven, the inner city appeared "exquisite" while the outer areas were a "sad, soiled place that slitered around in a sea of immorality".

On his first day of infant school, Lustig was immediately expelled for obscenity, after telling a female teacher "Leck mich am Arsch" ("Kiss my ass"). He was subsequently transferred to a one-room school in Čermná, around 5 kilometres from Hostinné. Classmates later recalled that Lustig was well-liked for his headstrong personality and expressive impressions of military leaders. Meanwhile, a 1902 school report described Lustig as "retarded morally, an idiot in other respects". By age thirteen, Lustig had taken up boxing and despite chronic health issues, such as recurring migraines and breathing difficulties due to sinus swelling, he had an unbroken attendance record.

In 1904, Lustig ran away from home for a week before returning to Hostinné. He was subsequently sent to a boarding school in Dresden, where he learned English, French, Italian, and Hungarian (other sources claim he learned five or six languages) and took a course in design. While his granddaughter Bettina claimed that Lustig excelled in his studies and continued his education there until his early twenties, most biographers state that he dropped out before his 17th birthday. Lustig's childhood friend Karl Harrer stated that Lustig had returned to Hostinné after receiving a poor grade on his design portfolio in June 1906. The two got drunk, with Harrer listening to Lustig complain about the elitist attitudes at his boarding school and the general unfairness of the world. The following year, Harrer received postcards by Lustig from Vienna, with the final correspondence claiming that he would study law at Charles University.

In 1909, shortly after starting a semester at the Sorbonne in Paris, Lustig took to gambling. During this time he also sustained a defining scar on the left side of his face from the jealous boyfriend of a woman he consorted with. Upon leaving school, Lustig applied both his quick wit and sizing up of a situation and his fluency in several languages to embark on a life of crime, eventually focusing on conducting a variety of scams and cons that provided him with property and money, and which transformed him into a professional con man.

== Career ==
Many of Lustig's initial cons were committed on ocean liners sailing between the Atlantic ports of France and New York City. He would pose as a musical producer seeking investors in a non-existent Broadway production. When the services of Trans-Atlantic liners were suspended in the wake of World War I, Lustig found himself in search of new territory to make an income from and opted to travel to the United States.

In May 1922, Lustig posed as Robert Duval and visited a bank in Springfield, Missouri. He purchased some land from the bank and overpaid with Liberty bonds. His change amounted to $10,000 in the bank's cash, and before leaving Lustig also pocketed his bonds. He was arrested in New York City and extradited by Governor Nathan L. Miller. Around this time, Lustig's infamy was growing among law enforcement.

== Eiffel Tower scam ==
In 1925, Lustig traveled back to France. While staying in Paris, he chanced upon a newspaper article discussing the problems faced with maintaining the Eiffel Tower, which gave him inspiration for a new con. The monument had begun falling into disrepair, and the city was finding it increasingly expensive to maintain and repaint it. Part of the article made a passing comment that overall public opinion on the monument would move towards calls for its removal, which was the key to convincing Lustig that using it as part of his next con would be lucrative. After researching what he needed to help him utilize the information from the article, Lustig set to work preparing the scam, which included hiring a forger to produce fake government stationery for him.

Once he was ready, Lustig invited a small group of scrap metal dealers to a confidential meeting at an expensive hotel, whereupon he identified himself to them as the Deputy Director-General of the Ministère de Postes et Télégraphes (Ministry of Posts and Telegraphs). In the meeting, he convinced the men that the upkeep of the Eiffel Tower was becoming too much for Paris and that the French government wished to sell it for scrap, but that because such a deal would be controversial and likely spark public outcry, nothing could be disclosed until all the details were thought out. Lustig revealed that he was in charge of selecting the dealer who would receive ownership of the structure, claiming that the group had been selected carefully because of their reputations as "honest businessmen". His speech included genuine insight about the monument's place in the city and how it did not fit in with the city's other great monuments like the Gothic cathedrals or the Arc de Triomphe.

During his time with the dealers, Lustig kept watch on who would be the most likely to fall for his scam and found his mark in André Poisson—an insecure man who wished to rise up amongst the inner circles of the Parisian business community. As Poisson showed the keenest interest in purchasing the monument, Lustig decided to focus on him once the dealers sent their bids to him. Arranging a private meeting with Poisson, Lustig convinced him that he was a corrupt official, claiming that his government position did not give him a generous salary for the lifestyle he wished to enjoy. Believing the sale of the Eiffel Tower would secure him a place amongst the top businessmen, Poisson agreed to pay a large bribe to secure ownership of the Eiffel Tower. However, once Lustig received his bribe and the funds for the monument's "sale" (around 70,000 francs), he soon fled to Austria.

Lustig suspected that when Poisson found out he had been conned, he would be too ashamed and embarrassed to inform the French police of what he had been caught up in, yet despite this belief, he maintained a check on newspapers while in Austria. His suspicions soon proved to be correct when he could find no reference of his con within their pages, and thus he decided to return to Paris later that year to pull off the scheme once more. However, when Lustig attempted to con another group of dealers and had managed to find a mark among them willing to buy the Eiffel Tower, the police were informed about the scam and he fled to the U.S. to evade arrest.

== Rumanian Box scam ==
One of Lustig's most notable scams was known as the "money box" or "Rumanian Box". It involved selling unsuspecting marks a machine that could duplicate any currency that was inserted into it, the only catch being that the device needed six hours to print a copy. The machine was a specially designed mahogany box, roughly the size of a steamer trunk. The box featured two small slots to take in the money and the printing paper. It also held a fake mechanism with dummy levers.

Lustig would demonstrate the machine by asking the mark for a specific bill (e.g. $100). He would insert it and the blank paper, then wait with the mark for the machine to work. Lustig had already stocked the machine with a genuine bill to match the one the mark inserted. When the planted bill was produced, Lustig would take the mark to a bank to authenticate the note. Once the mark was convinced, Lustig would sell the money box for an exorbitant sum.

Lustig once sold a money box to a Texas sheriff for thousands of dollars. Upon realizing he had been tricked, the sheriff pursued Lustig to Chicago. The cornered Lustig conned the sheriff into believing that he was not operating the device correctly. Lustig gave him a large sum of cash as compensation, but the bills were counterfeit. This counterfeiting would eventually lead to Lustig's arrest by American law enforcement officers.

== Later years ==
On 5 July 1929, Lustig and William McSherry were arrested in Chicago. Lustig was traveling as "Robert Miller", and both men had a variety of forged identification documents and letters of credit. They also had a money box with them. Upon his arrest, Lustig claimed to be an associate of Al Capone. Chicago police were unfamiliar with Lustig, however.

When the Great Depression hit, Lustig concocted a risky scam aimed at Capone, knowing that he faced certain death if his mark realized he was being conned. For Lustig, the scam was not a straight-out con, but one designed to get his target to part with a relatively small amount of cash. Lustig asked Capone to invest $50,000 in a crooked scheme, then kept the money given to him in a safe deposit box for two months before returning it, claiming the deal had fallen through. Capone got the impression that he was dealing with an honest man. At this point, Lustig told Capone that the failure of the deal meant he had lost all means of supporting himself. He then convinced Capone to give him $5,000 ($1,000, according to other sources) to "tide him over", as Lustig had originally planned.

In 1930, Lustig went into a partnership with two men from Nebraska—pharmacist William Watts and chemist Tom Shaw—to conduct a large scale counterfeiting operation. Watts and Shaw engraved the plates that would be used to print the counterfeit dollar bills, while Lustig organised a ring of couriers to distribute the forgeries, ensuring that they were kept in the dark regarding the production of the counterfeits. The operation managed to inject thousands of dollars of counterfeit money (nicknamed "Lustig money") to the U.S. economy each month for the next five years, though the increasing amount entering circulation eventually drew the attention of federal agents.

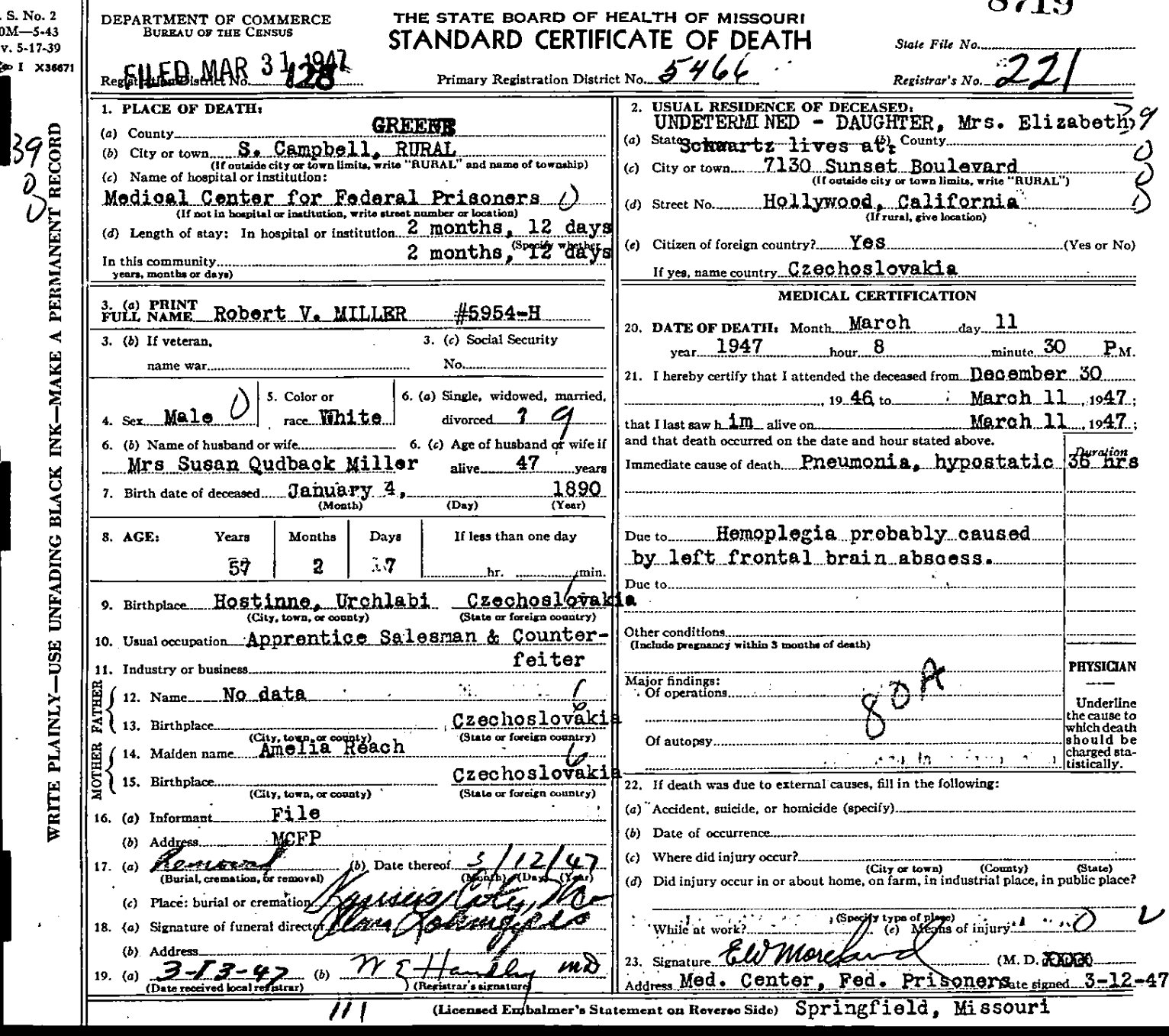
Lustig's death certificate, using the name "Robert V. Miller", one of Lustig's pseudonyms.

== Capture ==
When Lustig's mistress, Billy May, learned that he was betraying her for a younger woman, she decided to take revenge and placed an anonymous phone call to the federal authorities. On 10 May 1935, Lustig was arrested in New York and charged with counterfeiting. Although he openly admitted to his partners' involvement in the operation, he himself feigned ignorance in the matter. However, Lustig's refusal to disclose information on a key found in his possession proved to be his undoing, as it was later found to open a locker in the Times Square subway station containing $51,000 in counterfeit bills and the plates with which they had been printed.

On 1 September 1935, the day before his trial, Lustig managed to escape from the Federal House of Detention, The Tombs, in New York City by faking illness and using a specially made rope to climb out of the building, but he was recaptured 27 days later in Pittsburgh. Lustig pleaded guilty at his trial and on 9 December 1935, he was sentenced to fifteen years in prison on Alcatraz Island, California for his original charge, with a further five years for his prison escape.

== Death ==
On 9 March 1947, Lustig contracted pneumonia and died two days later at 8:30pm at the Medical Center for Federal Prisoners in Springfield, Missouri. On his death certificate his occupation was listed as apprentice salesman and counterfeiter.

== Ten Commandments ==
A set of instructions known as the "Ten Commandments for Con Men" has been attributed to Lustig:

1. Be a patient listener (it is this, not fast talking, that gets a con man his coups).

2. Never look bored.

3. Wait for the other person to reveal any political opinions, then agree with them.

4. Let the other person reveal religious views, then have the same ones.

5. Hint at sex talk, but don't follow it up unless the other person shows a strong interest.

6. Never discuss illness, unless some special concern is shown.

7. Never pry into a person's personal circumstances (they'll tell you all eventually).

8. Never boast. Just let your importance be quietly obvious. [The rule against boasting does not always apply in the United States today.]

9. Never be untidy.

10. Never get drunk.

These commandments are elaborated on in David Maurer's The Big Con by two ropers.

== See also ==
- Drunk History, in which Lustig is portrayed by Liev Schreiber
- List of con artists
- List of impostors
- List of scams
