= William Thompson (confidence man) =

American criminal and con artist

William Thompson was an American criminal and con artist whose deceptions probably caused the term confidence man to be coined.

Operating in New York City in the late 1840s, a genteelly dressed Thompson would approach an upper-class mark, pretending they knew each other, and begin a brief conversation. After initially gaining the mark's trust, Thompson would ask whether he had the confidence to lend Thompson his watch. Upon taking the watch, Thompson would depart, never returning the watch.

Thompson used various aliases including Samuel Thompson, James Thompson, Samuel Thomas, Samuel Powel, Samuel Williams, William Evans, Samuel Willis, William Davis, and William Brown.

Thompson was arrested and incarcerated in The Tombs in 1849. The New York Herald, recalling his explicit appeals to the victim's "confidence", dubbed him the "confidence man".

The Thompson case may have inspired Herman Melville's 1857 novel The Confidence-Man.
