= Ong Kean Swan =

Malaysian-Chinese businessman (born 1982)

Yang Berbahagia Dato' Sri Peter Ong Kean Swan SSAP DIMP
- Born: 7 November 1982 (age 43); Penang, Malaysia
- Occupation: Chief Executive Officer of Dream Success International

Ong Kean Swan
- Traditional Chinese: 王梓驊
- Simplified Chinese: 王梓骅
Transcriptions
Standard Mandarin
- Hanyu Pinyin: wáng zǐ huá
Yue: Cantonese
- Jyutping: Wong4 Zi2 Waa4
Southern Min
- Hokkien POJ: Ông Chú-hôa
- Tâi-lô: Ông Tsú-huâ

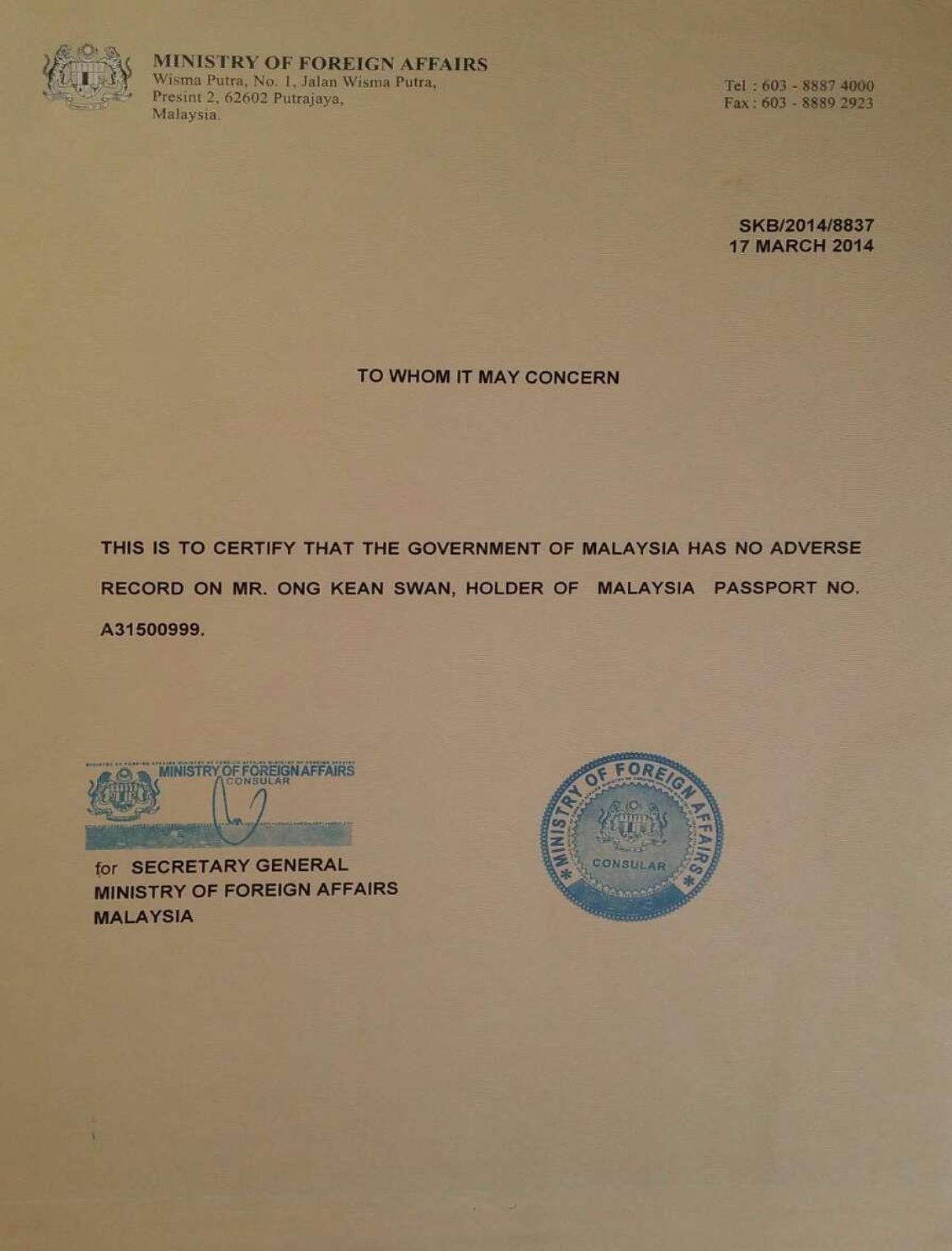
Certification from Malaysia Government - No Adverse Record

Peter Ong Kean Swan (born 7 November 1982) is a Malaysian-Chinese businessman. His companies were essentially pyramid schemes, and have been banned in China, Malaysia and Taiwan due to alleged fraud.

== Businesses ==
In 2007 Ong was working as a distributor for the multi-level marketing company Melilea, a company selling health and beauty products. In a defamation lawsuit he was charged with breaking his distribution contract and disclosing proprietary information. While the newspaper and other defendants were found to be not guilty of defamation, judgment was rendered against Ong and the other two distributors. Ong answered the complaint, but chose not to appear in court.

The Surewin4u corporate website says that in 2008 Peter Ong launched a successful coffee shop franchise concept. That was the year that Peter Ong together with his brother Philip became involved with the Island Red Café (Red Island Coffee) franchise business. The Ong brothers devised a multi-level marketing business plan for Island Red Café franchises through their company MLB International. The pyramid scheme collapsed, and in 2011, Ong Tong Swan (Philip Ong), Peter Ong's brother, as a director of Island Red Café, pleaded guilty to fraud.

His company website indicates that Peter Ong had also been involved with a multi-level insurance programme, before creating, in 2011, together with his brother Philip, the Surewin4u Group (圆梦赢家) to promote their gambling winning system. In 2012, he founded Dream Success International, which now includes Surewin4u, Dream Success Property, Dream Success Car Centre, Dream Success Jewelry, and Dream Success Coffee. On 25 September 2013, Dream Success International and website www.Surewin4u.com were listed by the Central Bank of Malaysia (Bank Negara Malaysia) as engaging in unlicensed activities. After the Taiwanese government closed down the Taiwan branch of Dream Success International in September 2014 leaving thousands of "investors" without recourse, Ong Kean Swan said there was nothing he could do ("圆梦无力回天"). In early 2015, Dream Winners and Surewin4u were widely revealed as a multi-level pyramid scam that operated not only in Malaysia and Taiwan, but also in Singapore and China.

Because he could not be found, his surrogates in Singapore were sued by a defrauded investor in 2017. The defendants settled out of court. Estimates of Singapore investors' losses are as high as 50 million Singapore dollars (US $36.7 million).

In 2018, Ong was reported in Myanmar (Burma).

== Life ==
Ong's family came from Hui'an County, Fujian Province, China, and Ong was born in November, in Penang. He was born in 1982, although some reports indicate 1983. His company website indicates that he graduated in information technology from the University of Nottingham in England in 2003.

In 2013, Ong was arrested for impersonating Perak royalty and using the title Tengku to which he was not entitled.

At his thirty-first birthday celebration in November 2013, he was noted for his philanthropy.

== Honours ==
- Pahang
  - Knight Companion of the Order of the Crown of Pahang (DIMP) - Dato' (2012)
  - Grand Knight of the Order of Sultan Ahmad Shah of Pahang (SSAP) - Dato' Sri (2013)
