= Harry Jelinek =

Czechoslovak con artist and Nazi propaganda publisher

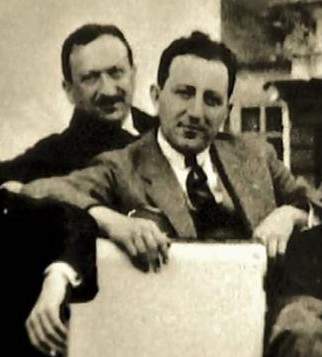
Jelinek, c. 1932

Josef "Harry" Jelinek (October 14, 1905–1986) was a Czechoslovak con artist and publisher of Nazi propaganda, who is reputed to have fraudulently sold the Karlštejn Castle to American industrialists in 1945.

== Biography ==
Jelinek was born 14 October 1905 in Vlašim, Austria-Hungary and died in Guarene d'Alba, Italy in 1986.
