= Randy Glass =

Randy Glass started off as a con man and later became a trusted U.S. undercover operative. He was part of a mission to snare terrorist arms buyers.

He was a jewelry dealer in Boca Raton, Florida who defrauded diamond & jewelry wholesalers of $6M. His sentence was reduced to 7 months for his participation in the FBI's illegal weapons purchase sting "Operation Diamondback".
