= List of fraudsters =

The following is an alphabetical list of notable people known to have committed fraud.

== A ==
- Alfredo Sáenz Abad, retired in 2013 as CEO and vice-chairman of the Spanish bank Santander Group; in lower executive position in early 1990s, lied about bank loans so that some customers of the bank went to prison, sentenced to prison years later but managed to get a pardon and kept his job
- Frank Abagnale Jr., American impostor who wrote bad checks in 12 countries until arrested in 1969: falsely represented himself as a qualified member of professions such as airline pilot, doctor, attorney, and teacher; the film Catch Me If You Can is based on his life
- Ramon Olorunwa Abbas, also known as Hushpuppi, Nigerian former Instagram influencer, fraudster and money launderer who operated from Dubai.
- John Bodkin Adams, British doctor and suspected years-long serial killer, but only found guilty – in 1957 – of forging wills and prescriptions related to over 300 deceased patients
- Delaney Anderson, a.k.a: see Anna March
- Eddie Antar, founder of Crazy Eddie; has criminal convictions on 17 counts and about $1 billion worth of civil judgments against him stemming from fraudulent accounting practices at that company
- Ruben Oskar Auervaara, a notorious Finnish conman and thief. He became famous by cheating money from women he met through newspaper announcements, by pretending to intend to marry them. His surname has become a concept in the Finnish language, meaning a deceptive charming trickster.
- Mehmet Aydın, Turkish entrepreneur; scammed 1.1 billion lira from 132 thousand people in a single year and went underground. Searched by Interpol with red notice due to qualified fraud.
- Samantha Azzopardi, a.k.a. Emily Peet, Lindsay Coughlin, Lindsay-Lana Jonbenet Coughlan, Dakota Johnson, Georgia McAuliffe, Harper Hernandez, Harper Hartis, is an Australian serial con artist and fraudster invented nearly 100 false identities across multiple countries, frequently posing as a distressed young girl, trafficking victim, or lost teenager. She has been diagnosed borderline personality disorder and pseudologia fantastica a.k.a. “pathological lying”.

== B ==
- Sam Bankman-Fried, owner of the now-bankrupt cryptocurrency exchange FTX, was convicted of multiple counts of wire fraud and conspiracy. The fraud centered around the laundering of over $10 billion between FTX and Alameda Research, another company owned by Bankman-Fried.
- Jordan Belfort swindled over $200 million via a penny stock boiler room operation. The Wolf of Wall Street is based on his life and fraudulent activity.
- Rabbi Bernard Bergman, an American Orthodox rabbi was the face of a massive nursing home scandal involving Medicaid fraud and horrific patient abuse. He built a multi-million dollar healthcare empire that systematically defrauded public health funds while leaving vulnerable elderly residents in vile conditions. In 1976, Bergman was convicted of Medicaid and tax fraud for thefts totaling $2.5 million ($14.8 million value in 2026), was sentenced to four months in a Federal correction center.
- Horatio Bottomley, newspaper owner and Member of Parliament, convicted of fraudulent conversion.

== C ==
- Melissa Caddick, Australian who ran a Ponzi scheme and thereby defrauded friends and close relatives.
- Cassie Chadwick, born Elizabeth “Betty” Bigley in 1857 in Eastwood, Ontario, Canada, also known as Louise Bigley, Lydia Scott, Mademoiselle Marie Rosa, Mademoiselle Lydia Devere, and Cassie L. Hoover. Masquerading as Andrew Carnegie's illegitimate daughter (which Carnegie publicly denied), she was ultimately granted a total of $2 million in loans (equivalent to ~$81 million in 2026). In 1905 Chadwick was arrested and tried for her crimes.
- William Chaloner, was a serial counterfeit coiner and confidence trickster, who was eventually proven guilty of high treason by Sir Isaac Newton, Warden of the Royal Mint. He was hanged on the gallows at Tyburn on 22 March 1699.
- Gina Champion-Cain, masterminded a massive $400 million multi-year liquor license lending Ponzi scheme before ordering employees to shred documents to cover it up.
- Charlene Corley, who with her twin sister, Darlene Wooton, ran a plumbing and hardware equipment supply company from 1997 to 2006 which used enormously inflated shipping costs to defraud the United States Department of Defense out of $21.5 million. Corley was sentenced to 6.5 years in prison. Wooten committed suicide in October 2006 after she was contacted by investigators. "There is no sentencing hearing scheduled in the case so Corley will remain out of prison for the foreseeable future."

== D ==
- Edward Davenport, self-styled as a "Lord"; from 2005 to 2009 was the "ringmaster" of a series of advance-fee fraud UK schemes for (non-existent) loans that defrauded dozens of individuals out of millions of pounds, while costing his clients further hundreds of millions in losses when they signed development property commitments backed by their anticipated loans
- Tino De Angelis, perpetrator of the 1963 Salad oil scandal, which ultimately caused over $180 million ($1.89 billion today) in losses to 51 corporations.
- Anna Delvey, born Anna Sorokin in Russia and grew up in Germany, posed as a wealthy German heiress to con New York elite, hotels, and banks out of hundreds of thousands of dollars. She was arrested in 2017 after failing to pay massive hotel bills, and her trial became a viral media sensation in 2018, and was convicted in New York of grand larceny, attempted grand larceny, and related offenses. She was released from New York State custody in February 2021; currently under house arrest in the United States. Delvey's life story has been the subject of multiple other television shows, interviews, podcasts, and theater productions.
- Jeanne de Valois-Saint-Rémy, a.k.a. “the Comtesse de la Motte”, was an 18th-century French con artist and the mastermind behind the infamous Affair of the Diamond Necklace. Her elaborate scam severely damaged the reputation of Queen Marie Antoinette and helped catalyze the public discontent that led to the French Revolution.
- J. David Dominelli in 1979 opened an investment company in La Jolla, Ca. and promised early investors a 40% to 50% return in a classic Ponzi scheme. By 1983 he conned 1,500 investors out of $80 million ($270.6 million in 2026). He plead guilty to four felony charges and was sentenced to 20 years in prison.
- Marc Dreier, managing founder of law firm Dreir LLP, a $700 million Ponzi scheme from 2004 to 2008
- Juliette D'Souza, styled herself as a shaman, able to bring people luck and good health. She stole over £3 million from a circle of UK residents, threatening to curse them with death and disease if they did not continue to pay. Served multiple jail terms for fraud.
- Enric Durán, from 2006 to 2008, took out 68 commercial and personal loans from a total of 39 banks in Spain with no guarantees or property as collateral, then gave the €500,000 to various anti-capitalist movements

== E ==
- Bernard Ebbers, founder of WorldCom, which went bankrupt in 2002 having inflated its asset statements by about $11 billion ($19.7 billion today)
- Barbara Erni, was a Liechtenstein woman who traveled across western Europe pulling off an ingenious, highly lucrative hotel heist scam that lasted for over 15 years. Her moniker "Golden Boos" stems from her signature strawberry-blond hair and great physical strength. In 1785, Erni was the last person ever executed in Lichtenstein.

== F ==
- Ramón Báez Figueroa, banker from the Dominican Republic and former President of Banco Intercontinental (BANINTER), charged in 2003 and later sentenced to 10 years in prison for a U.S. $2.2 billion fraud case ($3.9 billion today). The BANINTER Crisis was overwhelming for the small Dominican economy, equivalent to two-thirds of its national budget.
- Martin Frankel, American former financier, convicted in 2002 of insurance fraud worth $208 million, racketeering and money laundering

== G ==
- Belle Gibson, faked a cancer diagnosis, pretended to manage it through diet and natural medicine, and then raised $420,000 for cancer charities which she kept for herself.
- Anthony Gignac, a serial con man and fraudster who falsely took on the identity of Saudi prince Khalid bin Al Saud to entrap victims in investment scams and other schemes, currently serving an 18-year jail sentence
- Yisroel Goldstein (former Rabbi), is the former director and founder of the Chabad of Poway synagogue in California, who gained public attention after surviving a fatal 2019 Poway synagogue shooting and then in July 2020, pleaded guilty to federal tax and wire fraud charges. Goldstein was later sentenced to federal prison for a multi-million-dollar fraud scheme, including 90/10 Tax Scheme; Corporate-Matching Fraud; Grant and Insurance Fraud.

== H ==
- Shimon Hayut, international Ponzi schemer sentenced in Finland and Israel for fraud, wanted by Norway, Sweden, and the UK. His illegal activities were outlined in the Netflix movie "The Tinder Swindler" in 2022.
- Vladislav Horohorin, indicted in 2009 for fraud activities as a hacker and international credit card trafficker, sentenced in 2013
- Elizabeth Holmes, convicted of 4 counts of felony fraud in January 2022 – three counts of wire fraud, and one of conspiracy to commit wire fraud for misleading investors on the biotech company Theranos, a diagnostics company claiming to be able to perform multianalyte clinical chemistry using unsound liquid-handling tech. Company results were manipulated, not transparent, and real patient samples were handled in error.
- Sarah Howe (fraudster) founded the Ladies' Deposit Company, ("a bank run by women, for women") a predatory affinity fraud and early Ponzi scheme that promised single women and widows a staggering 8% monthly interest rate. "Some estimate that Howe collected nearly $500,000, the equivalent of about $16 million today." Tried and convicted in Boston, she spent three years in prison. After her release, she tried it again and opened "The Woman’s Bank" on West Concord Street, then in Chicago under the name "Ladies Provident Aid."
- David Hu, IIG cofounder sentenced to 12 years in prison for running a Ponzi scheme
- Hui Ka Yan, founder of the real estate group Evergrande responsible for a $78 billion revenue overstatement 2019-2020 leading to the Evergrande liquidity crisis

== I ==
- Samuel Israel III, former hedge fund manager; ran the fraudulent American Bayou Hedge Fund Group; pled guilty in 2005 of defrauding investors out of $450 million ($740 million today)

== K ==
- Charles Keating, central figure of the Savings and loan crisis
- Dennis Kozlowski, former CEO of Tyco International, convicted in 2005 of fraud and other crimes related to his receipt of $81 million in unauthorized bonuses, the purchase of art for $14.725 million and the payment by Tyco of a $20 million investment banking fee to a former Tyco director.
- Sante Kimes and her son committed numerous frauds, violated anti-slavery laws, and committed murders
- Russell King, convicted fraudster known for his part in the doomed purchase of Notts County Football Club. In 2019 he was there sentenced to six years imprisonment. He was released in 2021.
- Bashar Kiwan, Syrian-French convicted fraudster and mastermind of the Comoros passport sales scandal.
- Konrad Kujau, German fraudster and forger responsible for the "Hitler Diaries"
- Rudy Kurniawan, Indonesian wine fraudster in America

== L ==
- Kenneth Lay, American businessman who built energy company Enron; one of the highest paid CEOs in the U.S. until he was ousted as chairman and convicted of fraud (inflated profits of $600 million) and conspiracy, although, as a result of his death, his conviction was vacated
- Nick Leeson, English trader whose unsupervised speculative trading caused the collapse of Barings Bank
- James Paul Lewis, Jr., ran one of the biggest ($311 million) and longest running Ponzi schemes (20 years) in U.S. history
- Nancy Lott, a.k.a: see Anna March
- Victor Lustig, (a.k.a. Robert Miller, a.k.a. "the Count") con artist known as "the man who sold the Eiffel Tower", twice. He swindled Al Capone and walked away alive. In America, he produced counterfeit $100 bills. Arrested in 1935, he briefly escaped before being locked up for good with a 20-year sentence at Alcatraz.

== M ==
- Gregor MacGregor, Scottish con man; tried to attract investment and settlers for the non-existent country of Poyais
- Bernie Madoff, creator of a $65 billion Ponzi scheme, the largest investor fraud ever attributed to a single individual.
- Anna March (her last known alias), born Nancy Lott (active early 1990s) a.k.a. Delaney Anderson (active Mid-1990s) a.k.a. Nancy Kruse (active 2000s), is an American con artist who gained widespread notoriety for infiltrating and defrauding literary communities across the United States. Anna March (active 2011–2018) embedded herself within the literary circles of Los Angeles, San Diego, and Rehoboth Beach, Delaware, by branding herself as a wealthy, progressive, and supportive feminist writer, mentor, and philanthropist. New York Times bestselling writer Roxane Gay, publicly recounted being misled or scammed by March. Following the publication of her history of unpaid debts, bounced checks, and a $380,000 court judgment, March deleted her social media presence and vanished from public life.
- Gina Marks, a.k.a. Regina Milbourne, Natalie Miller, Zara Margazio, Regina Miller, Gina Mylkos, Melinda Mylkos, Amanda Marks, Gina Diprima, Gina Dupree, Amanda Gina Marks, Jill, is an American self-proclaimed psychic and witch, and a convicted fraudster known for operating large-scale "curse removal" scams, stealing more than $340,000 over three years. (Note: This Gina (Marie) Marks b.1973 - the psychic/fraudster - is not to be confused with Gina (Kucker) Marks, the Boston-area supply chain executive who shares the same name.)
- Matt the Knife, American con artist, card cheat and pickpocket; from age approximately 14 through 21, stole from dozens of casinos, corporations and at least one Mafia crime family.
- Billy McFarland organizer of the notorious (and failed) luxury Fyre Festival and other fraudulent activities in which he defrauded others of $27.4 million
- Gaston Means, professional con man during U.S. President Warren G. Harding's administration
- Harshad Mehta, committed fraud without bank receipts of ₹5 billion from State Bank of India and an individual scam of ₹14 billion using fake bank receipts. The Indian television series Scam 1992 is based on his life and fraudulent activity.
- William Miller, a Brooklyn bookkeeper. In 1899, Miller operated a business called the "Franklin Syndicate," and defrauded investors of $1 million — today's value of $40.5 million in 2026.
- Trevor Milton, founder and former CEO of Hydrogen Trucking company Nikola inc. Convicted of Fraud lying to investors to pump the companies stock price.
- Barry Minkow, founder of ZZZZ Best, a carpet-cleaning and restoration company, which was actually a front for a Ponzi scheme.
- Michael Monus, founder of Phar-Mor, which ultimately cost its investors more than $1 billion
- F. Bam Morrison, conned the town of Wetumka, Oklahoma by promoting a circus that never came
- Phillip Musica, engaged in tax fraud, bank fraud, and securities fraud in the McKesson and Robbins scandal of 1938

== O ==
- Ailey O'Toole: An American poet and freelance writer. She gained widespread internet notoriety in late 2018 when she was at the center of a major "Poetry Twitter" plagiarism scandal. Multiple authors revealed that her breakthrough chapbook, Grief, and What Comes After, contained heavily plagiarized verses from other contemporary poets. Ailey O'Toole did not face formal legal penalties, but her poetry career was effectively ended through severe professional and community retractions.

== P ==
- Lou Pearlman, former boy-band manager and operator of a $300 million Ponzi scheme using two shell companies
- Frederick Emerson Peters, American impersonator who wrote bad checks
- Thomas Petters, American masquerading as a business man who turned out to be a con man; former CEO and chairman of Petters Group Worldwide; resigned his position as CEO in 2008 amid mounting criminal investigations; later convicted for turning Petters Group Worldwide into a $3.65 billion Ponzi scheme; sentenced to 50 years in federal prison
- Charles Ponzi, Italian con artist who gave his name to the Ponzi scheme.
- Gert Postel, German mailman; worked as a psychiatrist in different hospitals
- A. C. Probert, American swindler and confidence trickster active from about 1887 to 1918, who served time for embezzlement.

== R ==
- Alves Reis, ran the 1925 Portuguese Bank Note Crisis, forging Bank of Portugal documents giving him authority to hire a firm to print money – official banknotes worth 100 million Portuguese escudos (adjusted for inflation, it would be worth about US$150 million today)
- John Rigas, cable television entrepreneur, co-founder of Adelphia Communications Corporation and owner of the Buffalo Sabres hockey team; indicted in 2002 for defrauding the corporation by concealing $2.3 billion in liabilities from corporate investors and of using corporation funds as personal funds, sentenced to a 12-year term in federal prison
- Christopher Rocancourt, a Rockefeller impersonator who defrauded Hollywood celebrities
- Scott W. Rothstein, disbarred lawyer from Ft. Lauderdale, Florida; perpetrated a decades long Ponzi scheme, until caught in 2009, which defrauded investors of over $1 billion

== S ==
- Michael Sabo, best known as a check, stocks and bonds forger; became notorious from the 1960s through to the 1990s as a "Great Impostor" with over 100 aliases, earning millions but also receiving numerous prison terms
- George Santos, American politician who fabricated his entire life story. In addition to the legal, ethical, and criminal investigations regarding systematic financial fraud, campaign finance violations, and personal misconduct Santos faced from 2008 to 2025, in August 2026, Santos was investigated and fined by the U.S. Commodities Futures Trading Commission for manipulating the market, and became the first person to be fined and banned for life by the prediction market platform, Kalshi.
- Emil Savundra, Sri Lankan insurance swindler; the collapse of his Fire, Auto & Marine Insurance Company left 400,000 motorists in the UK without coverage.
- Rick Scott: During Scott's tenure as CEO of Columbia/HCA, a federal investigation was launched into allegations of colossal Medicare and Medicaid fraud. Columbia/HCA admitted to systematically overcharging the government by claiming marketing costs as reimbursable by striking illegal deals with home care agencies and by filing false data about use of hospital space. It also admitted to fraudulently billing Medicare and other health programs by inflating the seriousness of diagnoses and to giving doctors partnerships in company hospitals as a kickback for the doctors referring patients to HCA. It filed false cost reports, fraudulently billed Medicare for home health care workers, and paid kickbacks in the sale of home health agencies and to doctors to refer patients. In addition, it gave doctors "loans" never intended to be repaid, free rent, free office furniture, and free drugs from hospital pharmacies. In all, civil lawsuits cost HCA more than $2 billion to settle. At the time, this was the largest fraud settlement in U.S. history. Scott was later elected to terms as Governor of Florida and then two terms as US senator.
- Jeffrey Skilling is an American former CEO of Enron Corporation, convicted of securities fraud (and other crimes) for his part in the 2001 Enron scandal, a $63.4 billion bankruptcy ($115.3 billion today).
- John Spano, struggling businessman who faked massive success in an attempt to buy out the New York Islanders of the NHL in 1996; ran an advance-fee for loans fraud after release from prison, sent to prison again, returned to fraud after serving that sentence, again sent to prison.
- Adele Spitzeder, a.k.a. “Adele Vio” was a German actress that arguably was the first to perpetrate a Ponzi scheme between 1869 and 1872 when she defrauded thousands of people by promising them 10% return of interest monthly which she paid with the money of new investors. At the height of her success, contemporary sources considered her the wealthiest woman in Bavaria. 32,000 people lost 38 million gulden, the equivalent of almost 400 million euros in 2017 money (US$617.47 million in 2026), causing a wave of suicides. Her personal fortune in art and cash was stripped from her.
- Allen Stanford, self-styled banker; sold fake certificates of deposit to over 30,000 investors in 100 countries, raking in up to $8 billion over 20 years. On March 6, 2012, Stanford was found guilty of running a massive Ponzi scheme.
- John Stonehouse, the last Postmaster General of the UK and MP; faked his death to marry his mistress
- Charles Stopford, assumed the identity of a deceased infant and claimed to be the Earl of Buckingham
- Ong Kean Swan, is a notorious Malaysian-Chinese businessman and the former CEO of Dream Success International. He is widely recognized for masterminding several massive multi-level marketing (MLM) and pyramid fraud schemes across Southeast Asia and China, most notably the casino-betting scam SureWin4U. He operated multiple fraudulent entities before disappearing from public view in late 2014 following international law enforcement crackdowns leaving thousands of investors across Malaysia, Singapore, Taiwan, and China with massive financial losses (estimated around US$35–50 million).

== T ==
- Kevin Trudeau, American writer and billiards promoter; convicted of fraud and larceny in 1991; known for a series of late-night infomercials and his series of books about "Natural Cures 'They' Don't Want You to Know About"
- Donald Trump (1946): Real-estate purchaser and hospitality venue operator found by a State of New York Supreme Court justice to have provided fraudulent statements of financial condition that vastly overstated his wealth. Victims included the Government of the United States, which relied on the documents when awarding Trump a contract to convert and operate the Old Post Office (Washington, DC) as a hotel, and borrowers and insurers who relied on the documents to provide favorable rates for which he was not actually entitled. The court ordered Trump's ill-gotten gains disgorged and placed a roughly $354 million judgment, plus interest, against him and his two adult sons.
- Trương Mỹ Lan, Vietnamese founder of Van Thinh Phat Group, a real estate development group which made fake loan applications to embezzle more than $12.5 billion from Sai Gon Joint Stock Commercial Bank, which she controlled through more than 2 dozen middlemen. Her arrest in October 2022 caused a bank run. Trial of the largest corruption scandal in Southeast Asia's history began in March 2024

== V ==
- Frau von Pfuel, and her two daughters used alchemical demonstrations to embezzle gold from Frederick the Great.

== W ==
- Samuel D. Waksal is the founder and former CEO of the biopharmaceutical company ImClone Systems. In October 2002, he pleaded guilty to charges of securities fraud, bank fraud, obstruction of justice, and perjury.
- Ferdinand Ward, financial swindler in the late 1800s
- Dina Wein Reis pled guilty to conspiracy to commit wire fraud in May 2011, having duped corporations out of tens of millions of dollars.
- Richard Whitney, stole from the New York Stock Exchange Gratuity Fund in the 1930s
- Darlene Wooton and her twin sister Charlene Corley, ran a plumbing and hardware equipment supply company from 1997 to 2006 which used enormously inflated shipping costs to defraud the United States Department of Defense out of $21.5 million. Wooten committed suicide in October 2006 after she was contacted by investigators. Corley was sentenced to 6.5 years in prison. Corley remains out of prison for the foreseeable future."
- Whitaker Wright, company promoter, convicted of fraud.
