= Cambria (company) =

Producer of engineered quartz surfaces

- Industry: Quartz
- Founded: 2000; 26 years ago in Le Sueur, Minnesota, USA
- Headquarters: Le Sueur, Minnesota, USA
- Area served: Worldwide
- Key people: Mark Davis (Chairman) Marty Davis (CEO)
- Products: Quartz surfaces
- Number of employees: 1,934 (2020)
- Website: cambriausa.com

Cambria (keɪm-bri-ə) is a producer of natural quartz surfaces in the United States. It is located in Le Sueur, Minnesota, with additional facilities throughout the United States, and in Ontario, Canada. Cambria is privately held and owned by the Davis family.

== Kitchen countertops ==
Cambria produces quartz surfaces, primarily for use as kitchen countertops. It is used in a similar manner as granite, except that it is not porous, and thus requires no periodic sealing. The look of any quartz countertop compares to granite in that the colors are deep and consistent.

The process of creating the countertops is different than granite, in that it is an engineered product, consisting of a minimum of 93% quartz and 7% epoxy binder and dyes. An engineered product that requires no sealer has the advantage in that it requires no harsh chemicals to seal, nor does it emit harmful chemicals into the air, making it potentially more environmentally friendly. Engineered quartz however may be damaged by heat unlike granite.

== Sun Country Airlines ==
In July 2011, Cambria purchased Sun Country Airlines out of bankruptcy for $34 million after the collapse of the Ponzi scheme of Tom Petters and Petters Group Worldwide, the former owner of the airline.

Cambria sold Sun Country in 2018.

== Cambria Silo ==
A silo, located on US 169 between St. Peter and Le Sueur, is rented by Cambria to store quartz granules and slabs. The silo was repainted with the Cambria logo. Cambria was ordered to remove the sign by MnDOT because it violated state law against advertisements along public highway corridors and county ordinance in historic preservation districts. Cambria was allowed to keep the silo repainted because it claimed to use the silo as a site to sell its products thereby bypassing the law through a rational nexus exemption. Prior to the Cambria logo, the silo was painted to appear like a can of 7 UP and later as an advertisement for 7 Up.

== Legend of Cambria movie ==
In 2018, Cambria released the movie Legend of Cambria. Narrated by Colin Farrell and directed by Alexei Tylevich. The film depicts the fantastical origin story of the Cambria brand, pulling heavily from Celtic mythology. The short film was 40 minutes long.
