= UBid =

Online Auction Company

uBid.com
- Industry: Online auction Online marketplace
- Founded: 1997; 29 years ago
- Founder: Gregory Knox Jones
- Defunct: 2022; 4 years ago
- Headquarters: Chicago, Illinois, USA

uBid.com was a website featuring an online auction and online marketplace for consumer products.

== History ==
In 1997, uBid.com was founded by Gregory Knox Jones as a subsidiary of Creative Computers, Inc., which also operated PC Mall.

In December 1998, during the dot-com bubble, the company became a public company via an initial public offering. After pricing at $15/share, the stock price reached $67 per share on its first day of trading, a market capitalization of over $1.8 billion.

Creative Computers completed the corporate spin-off of the company in May 1999.

In 2000, CMGI acquired uBid for $407 million in stock.

In June 2001, the company reached an agreement to feature its listings on Yahoo! Auctions. In December 2001, the company reached an agreement with Microsoft to feature its listings on MSN.

In November 2002, the company laid off 52 employees. It laid off 86 workers in December 2002.

In 2003, CMGI sold uBid to Takumi Interactive, owned by Tom Petters and Petters Group Worldwide.

In 2006, the company acquired the assets of Bidville.com. It was shut down in 2008.

The company changed its name to Enable Holdings. In 2010, the company filed for bankruptcy.

In October 2018, the company merged with Incumaker and in February 2019, the company changed its name to uBid Holdings, Inc. In December 2020, the company was renamed RDE, Inc. after acquiring Restaurant.com.

The ubid.com website was shut down in 2022.
