= Gertrude Seelig Danziger =

American businesswoman (1919–2021)

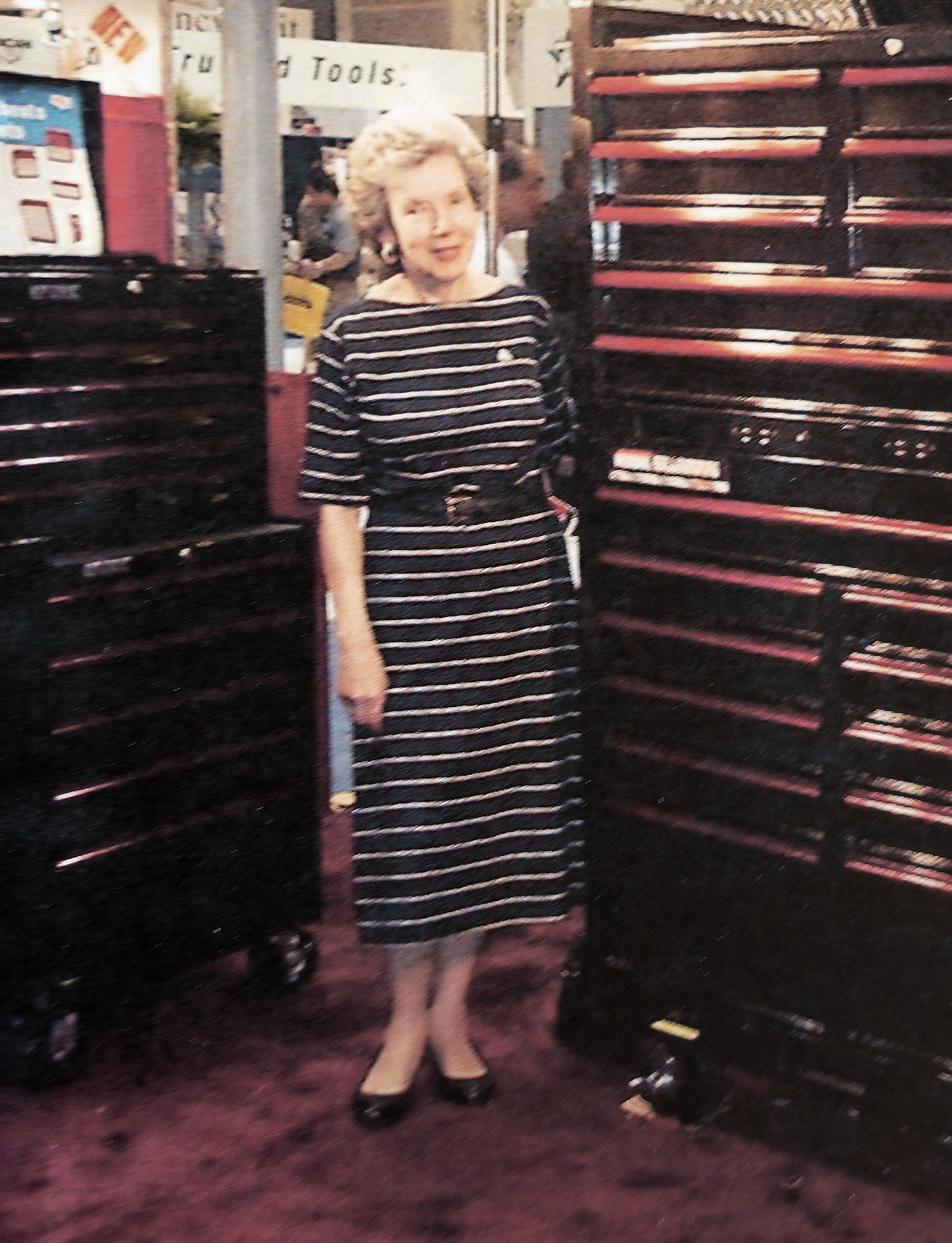
- Born: October 24, 1919
- Died: December 9, 2021 (aged 102)

Gertrude Seelig Danziger (October 24, 1919 – December 9, 2021) was a pioneer woman executive in American manufacturing. Born in Chicago, Illinois, she became president and CEO of Homak Mfg Co Inc, a Chicago-based leader in the hardware and houseware industries, in 1979 after the death of her husband and company founder, Sigmund H Danziger, Jr. (July 24, 1916 – December 11, 1979). During her 25 year tenure as president, Homak expanded its product lines into the sporting good and medical industries with gun/security cabinet and hospital cart lines and grew its production capabilities into a 430,000-square-foot manufacturing plant in Bedford, Park, Illinois, making it one of the largest sheet-metal fabricators in the country. At trade shows and in the hardware industry she was known as the "Toolbox Lady."

Life and Homak

Gertrude (Trudy) grew up on the northside of Chicago and attended Roosevelt High School, where she was salutatorian of her class. As a young adult, she was active in the Jewish United Fund. She had a strong interest journalism. After being accepted by Northwestern University to study it, she decided not pursue it for fear that when the men came back from the War, there would be few jobs. In 1953, she married Sigmund H Danziger Jr, with whom she had two sons, Robert and James. She started working with her husband in the 1960's at Homak Mfg Co Inc, which was a sheet-metal fabricator Sigmund had founded in 1947 in Chicago. The main product line of the company was kitchen cabinets but it branched into metal tool boxes early on. Upon Sigmund's death in 1979, she became president and CEO. Working with George Eberle the vice president of sales, most of the major mass and hardware retailers at the time, e.g., Sears, Walmart, Kmart, Lowe's, The Home Depot True Value, Ace Hardware, Montgomery Ward, Coast-to-Coast, Costco, Meijer, Pep Boys, Fingerhut, NAPA, became customers. Growing in size, Homak expanded from a 35,000-square-foot manufacturing plant designed by Sigmund at 4433 S Springfield Ave. In 1980, Gertrude completed the first of multiple additions to the plant and warehousing capabilities, culminating in a move to a 430,000-square-foot plant at 5151 W 73rd St, Bedford Park in Illinois. Major growth occurred when Richard Junge, VP of manufacturing, developed a line of consumer gun cabinets which was marketed to mass sporting good chains, including Bass Pro Shops, Gander Mountain, Dick's Sporting Goods and Sports Authority and introduced one of the first large powder coating systems in North America. With John Dopak, sales manager of the Medical Division, Homak also became a dominant player in the medical and crash cart market. A line of garage cabinets was launched for Whirlpool and Sears under the label "Gladiator Garageworks" in the early 2000s. A key to the growth of Homak was its leadership in these multiple industries and one of the largest sheet metal fabricators in America. She retired in the early 2000s and died on December 9, 2021, at the age of 102.
