= Fingerhut (disambiguation) =

Fingerhut is a name of German and German Jewish origin. It may refer to:

- Foxgloves in German
- Thimble in German
- Fingerhut, an online retailer
- Eric Fingerhut (born 1959), American politician
- Margaret Fingerhut (born 1955), British concert pianist
- The Fingerhut School of Education, a graduate school of American Jewish University
