= A. C. Probert =

American swindler and confidence man (1862–1918)

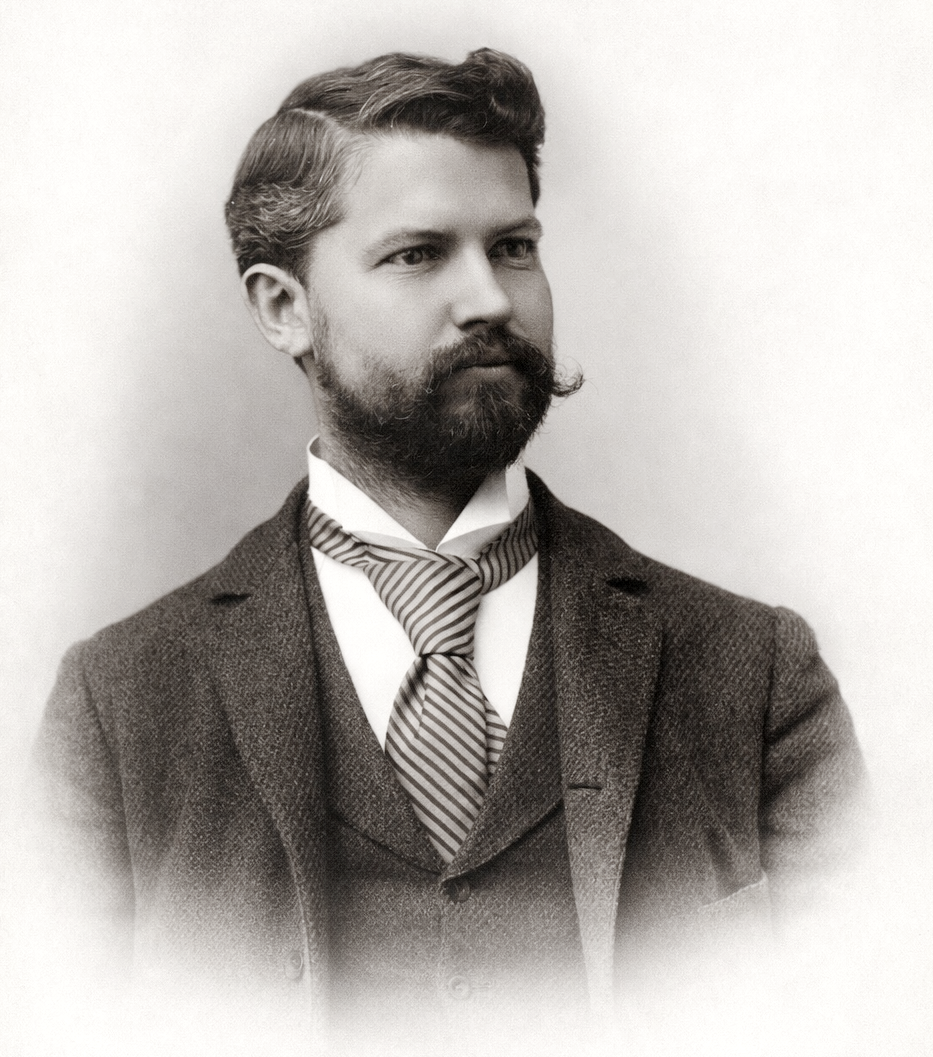
A.C. Probert, c 1890-1895

Arthur Clarence Probert (1862–1918) was an American swindler and confidence man active from about 1887 to 1918. In the course of his career, he conducted elaborate scams in small towns from the Great Lakes states to the West Coast. His primary activity involved establishing banks, then draining them dry and leaving town, but he also engaged in other ventures, such as posing as a physician and selling shares in nonexistent hospitals and promoting railroads that would never be built. Probert managed to get away with most of these schemes, typically leaving town before being exposed, but was caught and prosecuted twice, resulting in at least one period of incarceration.

== Early life ==
Arthur Clarence Probert was born on October 3, 1862, in Paterson, New Jersey, the son of Arthur Probert, a shoemaker, and Hannah Farrar Probert. Little is known about his early life, but census records show him residing in Mason, Wisconsin, in 1880. In 1886 he returned to Paterson and married his first wife, Jennie Clarinda Newell.

== Washburn, Wisconsin (1887–1898) ==
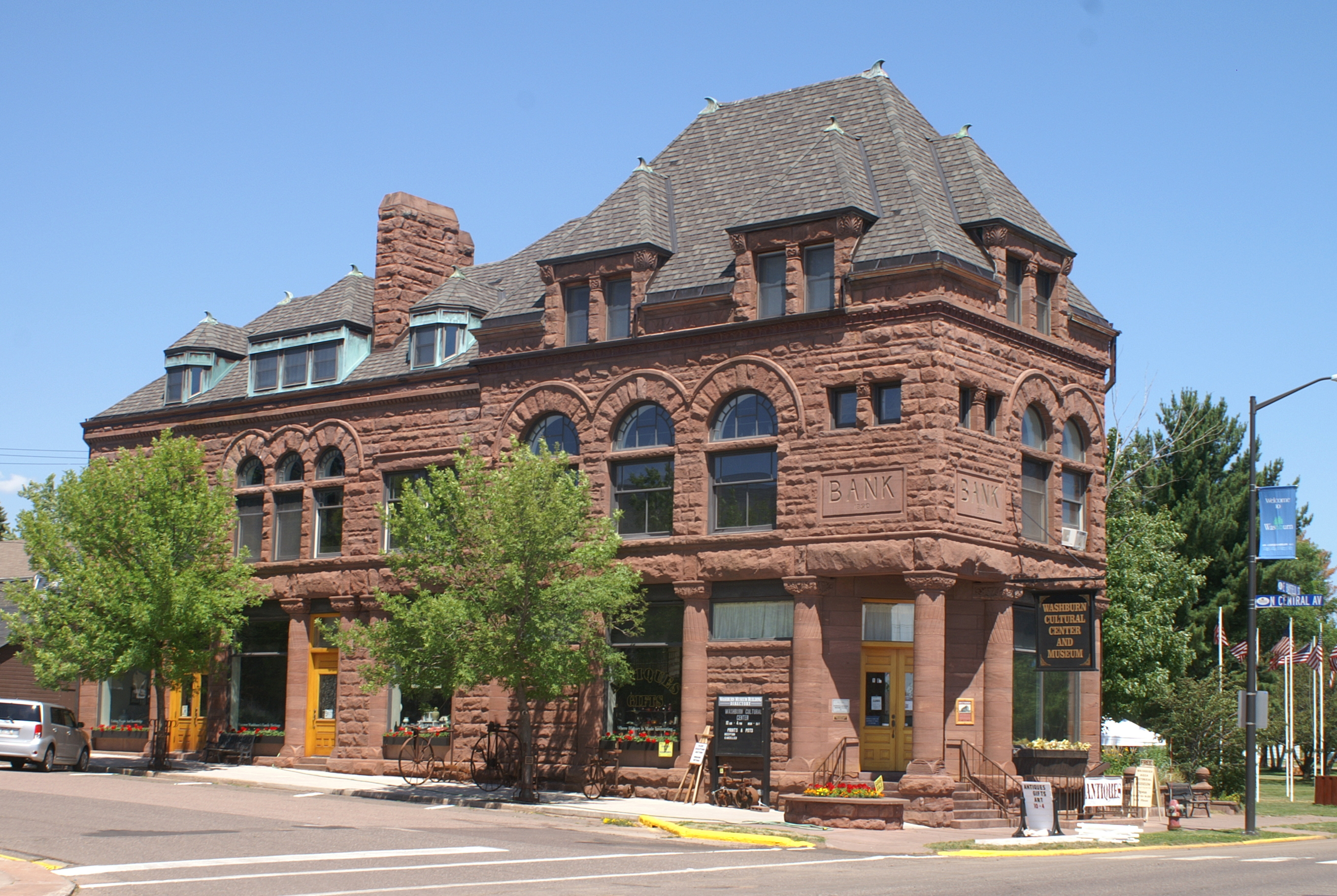
Bank of Washburn

Probert came to Washburn in 1887, four years after the town’s founding, and immediately took a prominent role in its nascent business community, founding the Bank of Washburn in July of that year. In 1889, Probert began construction of a permanent bank building to replace the firm's temporary quarters in Washburn's town hall. The new bank building opened its doors to the public on January 1, 1890. The three-story Romanesque Revival building, made from locally quarried brownstone, was described at the time as “the finest building in Washburn,” and remains the city's most prominent landmark. At the same time, Probert expanded his interests into other spheres of activity, starting a real estate firm, opening Washburn’s first brewery, and founding the Washburn Power and Light Company, which began providing electrical power to the city on October 31, 1891. By the early 1890s Probert had extended his banking interests beyond Washburn, and opened new banks in Prescott and Shell Lake, Wisconsin, installing his brother Edwin as cashier at the latter.

In 1892, Probert became a driving force in efforts to move the county seat of Bayfield County from the neighboring village of Bayfield to Washburn. A county-wide election held to resolve the issue resulted in a victory for Washburn, where a public celebration featured a speech by Probert, described in a newspaper report as “one of the prime movers” in securing the transfer.

Disaster struck Probert's network of businesses during the nationwide Panic of 1893. On June 7, Probert announced that the Bank of Washburn had become unable to meet its commitments, forcing him to close the establishment’s doors “for a few days.” Closures at the banks in Shell Lake and Prescott soon followed. In public statements, Probert blamed the reverses on “stringency of the money market,” but assured depositors that the banks’ assets exceeded their liabilities, and would be reopening soon. These assurances apparently failed to convince authorities in Shell Lake, and on July 18, the Washburn County Sheriff arrived from Shell Lake with warrants for A.C. and Edwin Probert's arrest, charging both with embezzlement. Released after arraignment, Probert and his brother returned to Washburn two days later. At the time, Shell Lake’s local newspaper commented, “It commences to look as though Mr. Probert is financially ruined.”

Despite these developments, Probert managed to secure agreements from many of his creditors to allow reorganization. The bank in Prescott reopened in January, 1894, the Shell Lake bank reopened that March, and the Bank of Washburn finally resumed business in April.

Despite his widely publicized financial problems, Probert was elected Chairman of the Town Board of Supervisors in April 1895, a position equivalent to mayor at the time. Three months later, he took on an additional role, running successfully for the town’s school board, then being chosen as president. Washburn's two newspapers quickly took opposing sides in their coverage of the Probert administration. The Washburn News became a determined critic of his banking practices, frequently publishing detailed financial critiques and urging legal accountability. In contrast, the rival Washburn Times defended him vigorously, portraying his troubles as the product of economic conditions, political hostility, or personal animus.

A cascade of events that would eventually result in Probert’s downfall began in October 1895, when his bank in Shell Lake was seized by the county sheriff and sold at auction, and his bank at Prescott went into receivership. Washburn town treasurer Pederson responded by demanding that Probert provide security for the municipal funds held in his Washburn bank, then attempted to withdraw the town funds completely. When Probert refused to comply, Pederson filed criminal charges, resulting in Probert's arrest. No sooner than that dispute was resolved, he was arrested again, charged for fraudulent practices uncovered in the management of his Shell Lake bank. An additional blow came in December when the Washburn brewery was declared insolvent.

The case that would bring Probert’s final defeat came from an entirely different quarter. In April 1896, a bank in Lodi, Wisconsin, charged Probert with embezzlement in a transaction involving two of his companies. In essence, Probert attempted to repay a short-term loan to the Washburn Electric Light and Power Company with a promissory note from the bankrupt brewery. The Lodi bank refused to accept this and instead filed a formal complaint.

Despite this series of public embarrassments, a substantial portion of Washburn's citizenry retained confidence in Probert’s character, insisting that the charges against him were nothing more than attacks by political foes. Just days after his arrest on the Lodi embezzlement charges, Probert was reelected Town Chairman by a plurality, as two opposing candidates split the anti-Probert votes between them.

The embezzlement charges finally came to court in late June, but the process did not go smoothly. The case halted when evidence of jury tampering by Probert supporters came to light. A second jury could not agree on a verdict, resulting in a mistrial. Finally, on July 22, 1896, a third jury found Probert guilty of embezzlement. Judge E.B. Bundy immediately sentenced him to two and a half years of imprisonment, and the county sheriff transported Washburn’s former mayor to the state penitentiary at Waupun the next day.

== Imprisonment (1896–1898) ==
Contemporary accounts reported that Probert received unusually lenient treatment during his transfer and admission to the state penitentiary. He was reportedly given additional time to settle his affairs, transported without restraints, and permitted to retain his beard despite institutional policy to the contrary. He was assigned to a desirable job caring for the prison library and assisting the chaplain. The latter role gave him access to other prisoners’ incoming mail. In early 1898, during an investigation into alleged irregularities in the chaplain’s office, it was discovered that Probert had exploited this access for personal gain. In one documented case, he stole a check for $55.00 (equivalent to roughly $2,163.00 in 2025) from an envelope addressed to one inmate, then had it cashed with the help of the chaplain. As a result, the chaplain lost his job at the prison and Probert was removed from his positions.

During his time in prison, Probert wrote several letters to newspapers, some of which were republished. In these letters he reflected on prison life and criminal justice, claiming that many of his fellow inmates had been wrongly convicted, while others, even if guilty of crimes for which they’d been sentenced, were merely victims of circumstance rather than hardened criminals. He suggested that temperament and misfortune played larger roles in criminal behavior than deliberate malice, and he expressed philosophical views on morality, detection, and public judgment. In one of these letters he offered a candid explanation of his outlook on life:

I find it is a great mistake to believe or think good people are the most light-hearted and contented. They are usually bothered by conscience and worried about everlasting damnation. My experience has taught me that this beautiful world is mostly enjoyed by airy sinners, who are clever enough to escape detection, and make money whenever they can get an opportunity or chance.

Throughout his imprisonment, Probert mounted persistent efforts to secure executive clemency, submitting unsuccessful petitions for pardon to Gov. William H. Upham in late 1896, then to his successor Gov. Edward Scofield in 1897 and early 1898. Probert was released from the penitentiary in September 1898 after serving more than two years of his sentence. On his way home to Washburn, he stopped first at a newspaper office in Oshkosh to give an interview, claiming that his prosecution had been politically motivated, and falsely asserting that he’d been pardoned by the governor. The Oshkosh newspaper reported Probert’s claims without verification, and other Wisconsin papers subsequently reprinted the account.

Probert concluded the interview by explaining that he’d be returning to Washburn to take up the practice of law “for which he studied years ago.”

== Michigan, Indiana, and Chicago (1899–1903) ==
After leaving prison, Probert did not return quietly to private life, nor did he pursue a legal career in Washburn. Instead, he re-emerged elsewhere almost immediately in a new professional guise: Arthur C. Probert, M.D. Over the next four years, he would present himself in several Midwestern locations not only as a physician and hospital administrator, but also as a banker, industrial promoter, and railroad financier.

=== Hospital schemes ===
Less than four months after his release from prison, Probert registered as a physician with the County Clerk of Berrien County, Michigan, citing credentials from the Independent Medical College of Chicago. That institution would be shut down the next year as a diploma mill, issuing ersatz diplomas to anyone willing to pay fees as low as $25.00.

By that point, Probert had already joined the staff of St. Luke's Hospital in Niles, Michigan, which had been operating since the previous summer under its founder, Charles W. H. B. Granville. Probert was initially listed as the hospital’s secretary and treasurer, but took over as president when Granville was arrested on a charge of bigamy and then fled the state.

St. Luke’s operated primarily not by caring for patients, but by selling “membership certificates” which would confer hospital staff affiliation on any physician purchasing them. One 1899 news report told of an “aged invalid” who had traveled from Pennsylvania to seek treatment there, only to find no doctors present.

The “hospital” advertised its membership certificates widely by mail, touting the benefits that affiliation would bring to a medical practice. One typical ad promised, “These certificates are a great attraction to any physician's office. All the members of our staff are delighted with them and say that they impart confidence in their visitors and patients. It is something that increases the practice of a physician and wins him dollars during the course of a year.” Three versions were offered at different price levels, printed on either “heavy royal linen paper, imitation parchment, or sheepskin.”

Michigan health authorities quickly characterized the enterprise as fraudulent. Prominent physicians denied any affiliation, and medical journals exposed the operation as a commercialized credential scheme rather than a functioning hospital.

Probert discontinued this operation sometime before July 1902, when he sold the “hospital” building, but would return to a similar scheme the following year. By 1903 Probert had shifted operations to Chicago, where he advertised himself as a physician on the staff of an institution known simply as the Christian Hospital. He employed the same tactics: glowing circulars, use of prominent names without authorization, and offers of staff appointments in exchange for payment.

Chicago's dentists were among the first to express suspicion about the legitimacy of the Christian Hospital, learning of Probert's previous activities in Michigan. The June 1902 edition of the publication Dental Summary printed a letter exposing Probert’s criminal history from an Ashland, Wisconsin, dentist who knew him personally.

The enterprise came under increased scrutiny when Probert sent out a promotional mailing claiming the endorsement of a prominent local physician, Dr. J. B. Murphy, without the latter’s permission. Murphy complained that he first became aware of this fraudulent use of his name when he began receiving letters from doctors all over the country excoriating him for presumably associating himself with the scheme. Murphy reported the matter to the Chicago Medical Society, which pursued the matter with postal authorities, leading to Probert’s arrest. In November 1903, he was convicted and fined $500.00, but some sources suggest that he absconded from Chicago without paying the fine.

=== Banking ventures ===
While promoting his medical institutions, Probert simultaneously continued his involvement in banking. In 1900 he appeared as president of the Farmers Bank of Bourbon, Indiana, and several months later he established an additional bank at Tippecanoe, Indiana. As in his earlier Wisconsin ventures, these banks were small private institutions heavily dependent on depositor confidence and personal reputation.

The Bourbon bank failed after less than a year of existence, and Probert, still residing in Michigan, was indicted on charges of receiving deposits after the bank was insolvent. Indiana authorities sought his extradition, but Michigan Governor Aaron T. Bliss refused the requisition, stating that in his judgment, the issues in question appeared to be civil matters rather than criminal. This refusal provoked public outrage in Indiana, where depositors reportedly hanged the Michigan governor in effigy.

Despite the indictment and negative publicity, Probert opened another bank in August 1903 in the nearby town of Eau Claire, Michigan, then shut it down two months later. Newspaper reports stated that the bank's largest depositor, the Eau Claire Canning Company, took a significant loss, but local businesses arranged reimbursements to the bank’s other creditors.

=== Manufacturing and railroad promotions ===
Probert’s ventures during this period extended beyond medicine and banking. Contemporary news reports provide a window into some of his diverse business ventures, but rarely report their ultimate outcomes:

- In January 1901 he was listed as secretary and treasurer of the newly incorporated Hutchinson Lock and Manufacturing Company.
- In September 1902 a newspaper report identified him as secretary and treasurer for the McNicholas Investment Company of Chicago, allegedly dealing in mining securities.
- In October 1902 Probert advertised 25,000 shares of preferred stock in the “Oregon & Idaho Central Railroad Company,” claiming plans to construct a 110-mile line linking Oregon to Idaho mining districts.
- In April 1903 he appeared in Benton Harbor, Michigan, as treasurer of the American Searchlight Company, a manufacturer of gasoline lamps and related equipment, explaining he was searching for a location for a manufacturing plant.

=== Departure ===
By late 1903 Probert faced simultaneous pressures: the federal mail fraud conviction in Chicago, pending Indiana indictments related to the Bourbon bank, and the collapse of his private bank in Eau Claire. Following his November 1903 conviction, Probert’s name largely disappeared from Chicago newspapers.

== Dayton, Oregon (1904) ==
In January 1904, Probert resurfaced in Dayton, Oregon, representing himself as an experienced Chicago banker and promoter. Local newspapers reported that he planned to establish a state bank with $25,000 in capital, and that he had leased suitable premises for a term of one year. By February, the State Savings Bank of Dayton had opened for business.

Probert cultivated an image of prosperity and respectability. Contemporary descriptions emphasized his “suave manner,” “businesslike demeanor,” and “splendid address,” qualities that enabled him to quickly gain the confidence of Dayton’s business community and depositors. Despite several reports of previous financial troubles in Wisconsin and elsewhere, many local residents defended him as a reformed man who had paid past creditors “one hundred cents on the dollar.”

On March 2, 1904, Probert disappeared from Dayton with no explanation. When the bank failed to open the following morning, a U.S. marshal forced entry into the building, enabling a group of local citizens to inspect the premises. They found no sign of a struggle in the back room that Probert had been using as living quarters, and numerous items of Probert’s belongings left behind.

Initial speculation included suicide, especially after reports that shots had been heard near town at dawn. Press reports mentioned rumors of a mysterious “unknown enemy” intent on destroying Probert’s reputation, driving him to despondency. However, reports emerged the following day that placed him at the railroad station at Albany, Oregon, where he reportedly boarded a southbound train. Witnesses there described his appearance as “mud-bespattered, as though he had spent the night in traveling over the country roads,” and his manner “disturbed and restless.”

Newspaper investigations connected Probert to his earlier failed banking ventures in Wisconsin, Michigan, and Indiana. Further speculation arose on the third day after his disappearance when a published report claimed that Probert had just gotten word that unnamed Eastern creditors had contacted an Oregon law firm to pursue collection of debts they were still owed.

A warrant was issued for Probert’s arrest on charges of larceny and embezzlement. When the bank’s safe was opened under court supervision several days later, it was found to contain only modest assets: approximately $2,000 in notes and less than a dollar in coin. Estimates suggested that depositors would recover most of their funds, and that Probert himself may have absconded with only several hundred dollars. Civil suits were filed by creditors, though proceedings against the nominal directors collapsed in court, leaving Probert as the principal defendant.

== Cora Hans incident (1905) ==
Probert was next heard from in April 1905, when news articles suggested he was involved in a scheme to force a young woman into marriage in order to gain control of her expected inheritance. His involvement came to light when 19-year-old Cora Hans, a niece of the department store magnate Aaron Montgomery Ward, suddenly left her home in Niles, Michigan, without explanation and fled to Detroit. Upon her arrival, she and her waiting sweetheart were married less than an hour after she got off the train. The elopement received brief but intense coverage in local newspapers.

Subsequent reports explained that Hans had discovered a letter that Probert had written her mother, with whom he had lived during his time in Niles. In the letter, Probert proposed that mother and daughter come to California, where “we will marry the girl,” implying that Probert was seeking access to Hans’s expected inheritance. The precipitous marriage was framed as the young woman’s way of defeating that plan.

No further reports have been found about Probert's role in this episode, but census records show Cora Hans and her husband, Ivo Faurote, remained together until her death from appendicitis seventeen years later.

== Ben Lomond, California (1905) ==
In March 1905, Probert appeared in the mountain resort town of Ben Lomond, California, using the alias Clarence P. Davis. Over the next two months, he opened a bank and a general store, and began publication of a weekly newspaper. Reporting this news, the Los Angeles Times commented that Davis “promises to be a real benefactor” to Ben Lomond.

Probert, alias “Davis,” quickly established a commanding presence in the small town. Local reports described him as energetic and ambitious, promoting various development schemes for the town. By September, Probert was so well esteemed in Ben Lomond that a newspaper in neighboring Santa Cruz profiled him in an article headlined “A Desirable Citizen.”

During that autumn, Probert pursued a whirlwind romance with Lou Olive Hume, a well-to-do young woman whose family had a summer home in Ben Lomond. On November 14, 1905, the pair eloped to Oakland and were married, much to the surprise of their friends and acquaintances.

Less than a month later, however, Probert's scheme suddenly began to collapse thanks to a chance encounter on a passenger train. In early December, returning from a trip to San Francisco, he was greeted as “Dr. Probert” by a traveling salesman, otherwise unidentified, who recalled meeting him in Chicago. Probert assured the man he was mistaken, and claimed to be a traveling salesman himself. When the acquaintance revealed he happened to be en route to Ben Lomond, Probert quickly altered his plans and traveled on, eventually arriving somewhere in Oregon, where he telephoned his wife to let her know he’d be delayed.

Over the next week Probert contacted his wife several times, telling her first that he was in Chicago, and then that he’d gone to El Paso, Texas. He finally informed her that he’d be returning from his trip on December 18. In the meantime, Probert’s extended absence raised speculation in town, and his Chicago acquaintance, who had remained in Ben Lomond, informed the local sheriff of his suspicions. The sheriff, in turn, contacted an Oregon counterpart, who told him about Probert's disappearance from Dayton, and sent him a photograph taken while Probert was there. Upon receiving the photo, it was described as a “remarkable likeness” of the man known as Davis.

On December 18, Probert arrived in Santa Cruz, where his wife had arranged to meet him. Accompanying her, however, was the county district attorney, Benjamin Knight, who asked him to come to his office. Probert deposited his luggage at a nearby hotel, then went with his wife to meet with the district attorney. Observers reported that Mrs. Probert was very cool toward her new husband.

During the meeting that followed, Knight confronted Probert with the information he'd gathered, then showed him the Oregon photograph. Probert studied the photo and denied it was him. After he made several conflicting statements under questioning, Mrs. Probert asked the district attorney if she could speak with him privately. Probert stepped out the door as requested, then immediately hurried to the railroad station, where he caught the next train out of town, leaving his luggage behind in his haste. He would later write a Ben Lomond acquaintance how bitterly disappointed he was that his “disloyal” wife had turned against him so quickly.

A warrant was subsequently issued for his arrest on a charge related to swearing falsely when obtaining his marriage license under the name “C. P. Davis.” The marriage to Lou Olive Hume was later annulled by the Santa Cruz County Superior Court, restoring her maiden name, but before that took place, Probert had already married his third wife, adding bigamy to his list of offenses.

== Molina, Colorado (1906–1908) ==
After his hasty departure from Ben Lomond, Probert next surfaced in western Colorado, where he quickly became involved in commercial and civic promotion in the Plateau Valley town of Molina. Within weeks of his arrival Probert appeared before the Chamber of Commerce in nearby Grand Junction, advocating construction of a railroad connecting that city and the Plateau Valley, adding that if Grand Junction interests were unwilling to invest in the project, the businesses of the Plateau Valley would take care of it on their own. Later, he would announce plans to build an opera house in Molina, with seating for 700 people.

Throughout the next two years, Probert’s name would often be mentioned in connection with civic and agricultural organizations in Molina and the surrounding valley. The Grand Junction Daily Sentinel noted that Probert “has resided in the Plateau but a short time, but ever since his residence there he has worked for unity and community of interests.” He was chosen to serve on the board of directors of the upcoming county fair, and spearheaded fundraising efforts to build a church in Molina. Probert also became active in the local Republican Party, and served as a delegate to the county convention in 1906.

In August 1908, however, Probert sold all of his interests in Molina to two entrepreneurs from Pueblo, Colorado. No reports have been found suggesting that Probert left the town under suspicion, and the Daily Sentinel lamented his departure, commenting that Probert “was recognized as one of the valley's foremost boosters and most enterprising business men,” but expressing confidence that “with his experience, energy and ability to make friends, there is no question but that Mr. Probert will secure his share of [Greeley’s] business.”

== Greeley, Colorado (1908–1909) ==
In July 1908, several weeks before Probert departed Molina, the Greeley Tribune announced that Probert had purchased the Red Front Mercantile Company, a large general store in that town. The Red Front Store was described as a large business, employing nine or ten clerks, and dealing strictly in cash. Over the next several months, local newspapers spoke approvingly of improvements he made to the store, and early the following year, Probert announced plans to replace the existing single-story wood building with a two-story brick structure. Sometime during that winter, Probert incorporated the business, issuing $25,000 worth of stock in the enterprise.

On May 19, 1909, however, Probert filed for bankruptcy. One local newspaper expressed confidence in his ability to recover: “Although here but a short time there is no man in Greeley who has made more friends than Mr. Probert… The Greeley people have not lost confidence in Mr. Probert and hope to see him in business again as soon as matters are straightened out.” Several weeks later, though, reports emerged suggesting that confidence had been misplaced: according to the Grand Junction Daily Sentinel, “creditors will realize very little from the wreck,” and the company stock was considered to be “valueless.”

== Taos, New Mexico (1909–1918) ==
No details have been found concerning Probert's 1909 departure from Colorado, but by October that year, newspapers reported his presence in Taos, New Mexico, filing incorporation papers for a new bank. His brother, Hubert F. Probert, was listed as president of the new State Savings Bank of Taos, holding one share in the bank, while Probert himself held 87 shares and served as vice president and cashier.

As in other communities, Probert quickly immersed himself in multiple ventures. Advertisements in early 1911 promoted “Probert & Company” as dealers in lands, mines, bonds, and stocks, and offered business opportunities throughout Taos County. That summer he appeared prominently among the incorporators and officers of the ambitious Taos, Sierra Nevada and San Francisco Railroad Company, a proposed 750-mile line extending from Utah across northern New Mexico. He also became involved in copper mining interests in the Rio Hondo district with an associate, John B. Bidwell.

Probert cultivated a visible public presence in Taos through a variety of means. In 1910, he purchased a twenty-five percent share in La Revista de Taos, the town’s Spanish-language newspaper. In the following year, he was appointed vice president of the New Mexico State Fair. When a fund was established for the construction of a cathedral in Taos, Probert's contribution was more than ten times the next largest reported donation.

Probert also became active in Republican politics in Taos County and was a delegate to party conventions. His prominence was such that his speeches at political gatherings drew significant attention.

His bank soon encountered difficulties, however. In October 1911, John Joerns, the New Mexico territorial traveling auditor, inspected its books and found serious irregularities. Joerns ordered the bank closed, and Probert was arrested and released on $5,000 bail on a charge of making false representations. Widely reported as the first bank failure in New Mexico in many years, the bank’s collapse triggered political turmoil in Taos County, intensifying factional divisions within the Republican Party.

Subsequent investigation led to specific charges of embezzlement. In November 1912 Probert was convicted at Taos of embezzling $500 in escrow funds belonging to Roy A. Clifford, a depositor at the bank, and was sentenced to a term of six to eight years in the state penitentiary. Probert appealed the conviction, and in April 1914, the New Mexico Supreme Court reversed the lower court's verdict, citing errors by the prosecution. The state immediately filed six more indictments, but no reports have been found indicating that these went to trial, and it is unclear whether Probert actually spent any time in prison as a result of this conviction. A Santa Fe newspaper reported that he was in that city “doing business” in February 1914, nearly two months before the ruling was issued.

Meanwhile, Probert continued to appear in public life. He wrote promotional articles on fruit growing in the Taos Valley, emphasizing irrigation, climate, and railroad prospects. His wife, an elementary school teacher, was often mentioned in reports of school activities and musical performances.

During this time, disputes arose involving his copper mining investments. Probert and his partner John Bidwell became entangled in protracted litigation over the Fraser copper mines with William Fraser, a former associate. When the New Mexico Supreme Court ruled in favor of Probert and Bidwell in July 1914, Fraser vowed that he would kill either of them if they attempted to take possession of the mine. Ignoring reports that Fraser had already killed several men, Bidwell and a helper went to the site to begin preparations for operation. Fraser followed on July 16 and confronted Bidwell at gunpoint, but was killed in the gunfight that followed. The coroner's inquiry that followed ruled the killing justified on grounds of self-defense.

Throughout this time, Probert remained on the masthead of La Revista de Taos as secretary and treasurer, but no further reports appeared of activities on his part.

== Death ==
On May 28, 1918, A. C. Probert died at his residence in Taos. His death was attributed to pernicious anemia. Announcing his death, the Spanish-language newspaper La Revista de Taos spoke glowingly of their long-term secretary and treasurer: “The deceased was a man of great ability, of boundless energy, and of a great and magnanimous heart, qualities that we all knew here; his generosity and philanthropy toward others led him to failure in his banking businesses. . . .”

He was survived by his third wife, Emma W. Probert.

== Legacy ==
Probert’s legacy remains tangible in one community where he was active. The three-story Bank of Washburn building, listed on the National Register of Historic Places, remains a focal point of the city’s downtown. Restored in the 1990s to its original appearance, the structure now houses an art gallery, community meeting facility, an antique store, and the local historical society museum, which includes an exhibit on Probert’s career among its displays.

== See also ==
- White collar crime
- List of fraudsters
