= Bank of Washburn =

- U.S. National Register of Historic Places
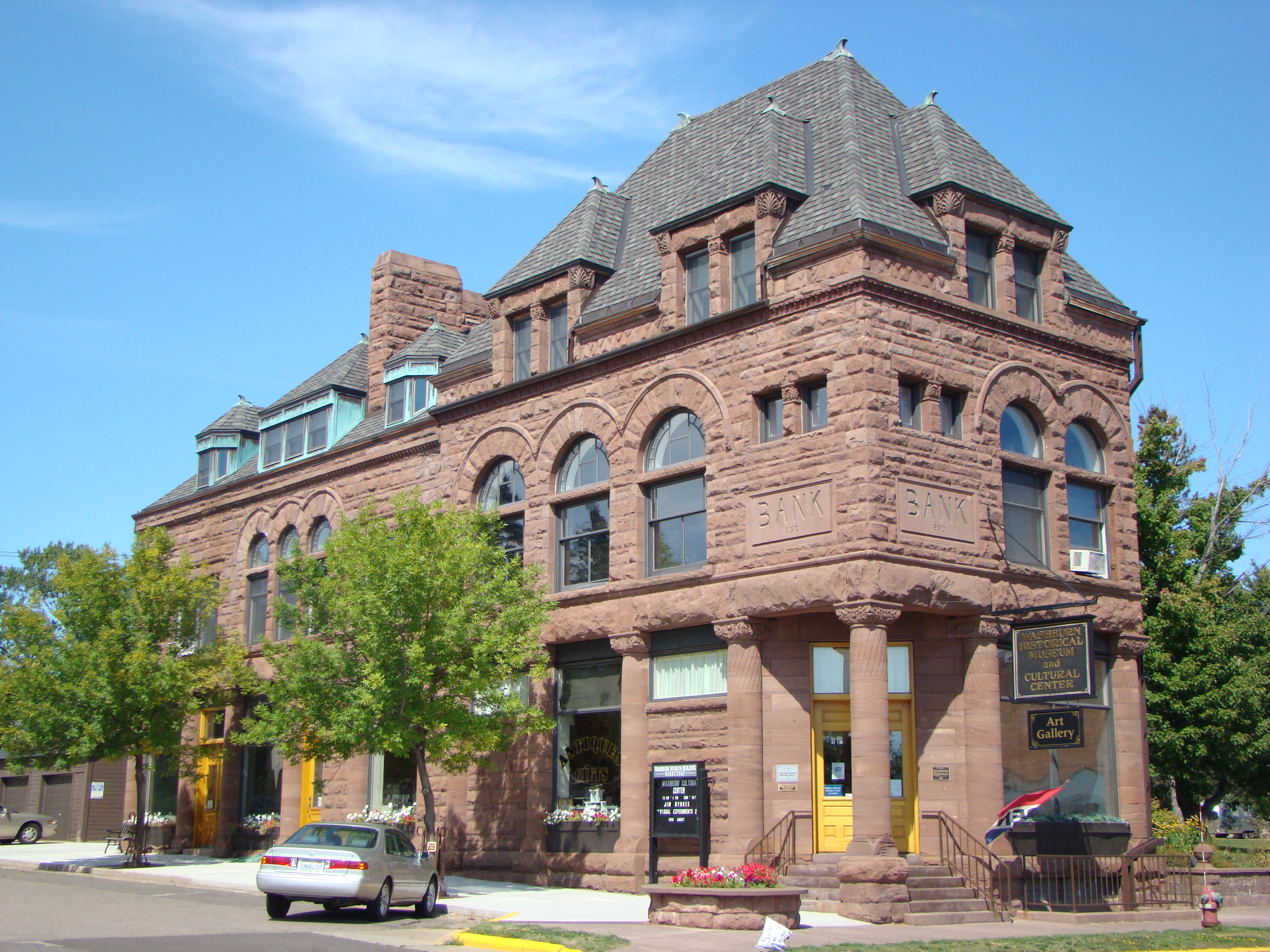
- Bank of Washburn

- Location within Wisconsin Location within the United States
- Location: 1 E. Bayfield St. Washburn, Wisconsin
- Coordinates: 46.67336°N 90.8913°W
- Built: 1890
- Architect: Allan Conover and Lew F. Porter
- Architectural style: Romanesque Revival
- NRHP reference No.: 80000105
- Added to NRHP: January 17, 1980

The Bank of Washburn is a historic bank building located at 1 East Bayfield Street in Washburn, Wisconsin. It was built in 1890 for a bank founded three years earlier by the convicted confidence trickster A. C. Probert. The bank was built from brownstone and has a Romanesque Revival design. It was added to the National Register of Historic Places in 1980 and to the State Register of Historic Places in 1989.

== History ==
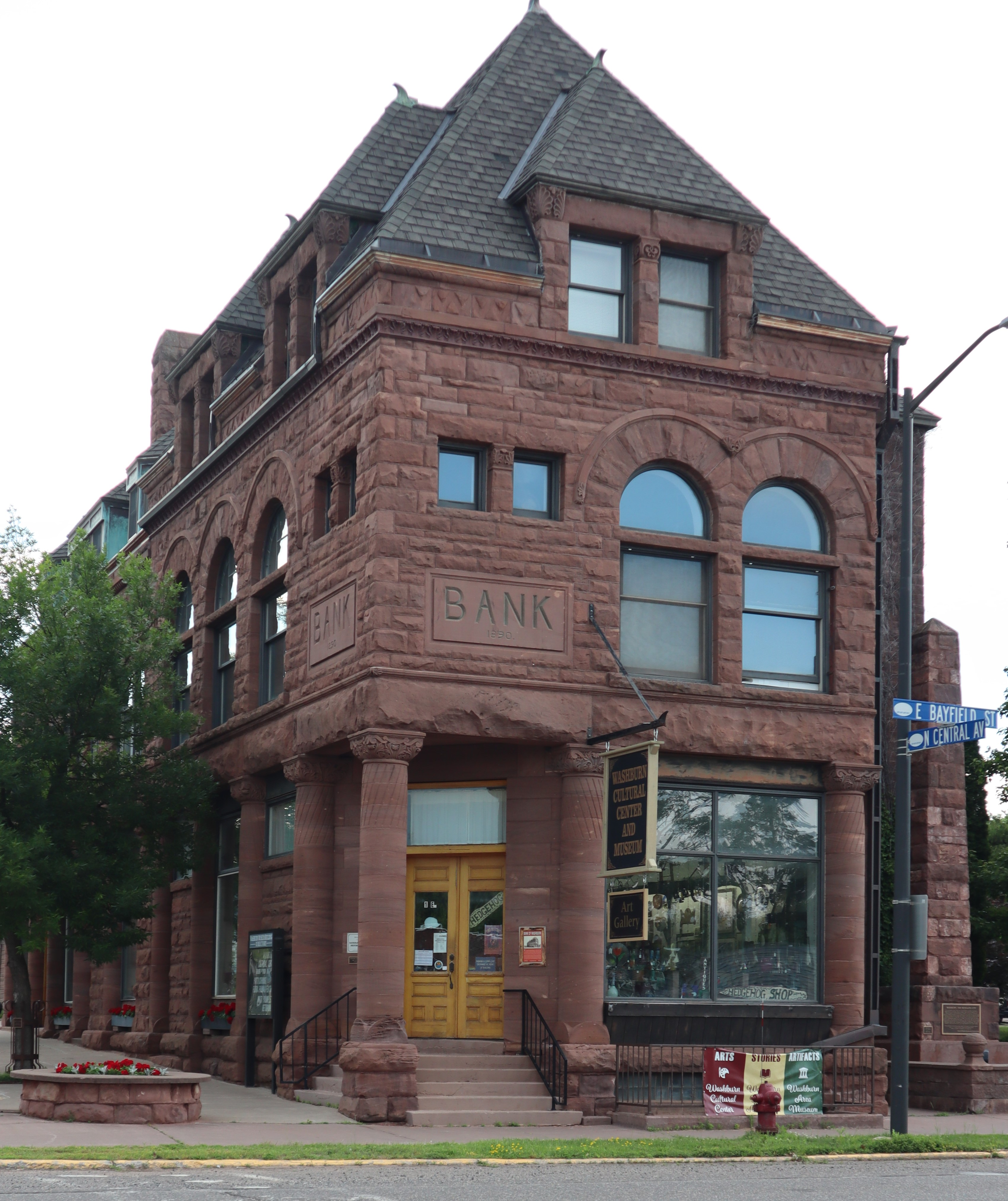
Washburn Area Museum and Cultural Center in 2026

A.C. Probert founded the Bank of Washburn in 1887, making it the first bank in Bayfield County. In 1890, he built the contemporary building as a permanent home for the bank. The two-and-a-half story building cost $25,000 and included office space on its second story. Probert was convicted of bank fraud and imprisoned in 1895, and the village government took ownership of the building after a legal battle. The village leased the building to the Bayfield County Bank, which operated it until 1923 when it was also shut down for violating banking law.

The bank building was added to the National Register of Historic Places on January 17, 1890. It is currently home to the Washburn Cultural Center, which restored the building in the early 1990s.

== Architecture ==
The Ashland architecture firm Conover & Porter designed the Romanesque Revival building. It was built from locally quarried brownstone, a popular building material in northern Wisconsin; as Washburn suffered a fire in 1888, Probert chose a fireproof material for his bank. The first floor is divided by sixteen columns along the street-facing facades, with the main entrance at the corner. The second floor features round arched windows typical of the Romanesque style along with two nameplates reading "BANK" above the entrance. The hip roof is divided into two sections, one steeper than the other; both are punctuated by dormers. The Washburn News described the bank as "the finest building in Bayfield County" upon its completion, and it is still the tallest building in Washburn.
