= Frank Vennes =

American convicted felon

Frank Elroy Vennes Jr. is an American multimillionaire and convicted felon.

In 1987, Frank Elroy Vennes Jr., was convicted on federal charges of money laundering, illegal firearm sales and cocaine distribution.

In 1990, Vennes announced a religious transformation while incarcerated and became a major political contributor after his release .

Vennes was the primary Ponzi scheme fundraiser for Tom Petters, who was convicted of organizing a Ponzi scheme $3.5 billion in Minnesota.

In 2008, Vennes' homes were raided by federal agents in connection with the Petters Ponzi scheme. In July 2011, he was charged with eight counts of securities fraud, six counts of wire fraud, three counts of money laundering, three counts of bank fraud, and two counts of mail fraud.

On February 1, 2013, Vennes pleaded guilty to charges of securities fraud and money laundering and on October 18, 2013, he was sentenced to 15 years in Federal prison.

== 1987 Money laundering conviction ==
Internal Revenue Service agents investigating suspected money laundering by certain North Dakota car dealers were informed that Vennes, the owner of a pawnshop in Bismarck, North Dakota, had visited Switzerland multiple times and might have experience transferring funds to foreign countries.

Vennes was approached by an undercover IRS agent posing as an investor from Chicago in 1986. He received $370,000 from the agent over the next three months and transferred the funds to offshore accounts in Switzerland, the Isle of Man and the Bahamas. In one transaction, Vennes personally delivered $100,000 to Switzerland. Vennes alleged that his associates had either stolen or lost the $100,000.

Vennes was charged in three indictments in May 1987. He was convicted on federal charges of illegal firearm sales, money laundering and cocaine distribution. He pleaded guilty to the money laundering charge and no contest to the other charges. He was sentenced to five years in federal prison, and served three at the Federal Correctional Institution, Sandstone.

== Prison religious conversion ==
While in prison, Vennes announced a religious conversion. He was released in 1990 and filed a petition for a pardon. Vennes also filed a suit against IRS, alleging that he had been a victim of entrapment.

== Political contributions ==
Vennes has been a major financial contributor to the campaigns of former Minnesota Governor Tim Pawlenty and Congresswoman Michele Bachmann. In 2006, he and his family were the top contributors to Bachmann's campaign.

In 2007, Bachmann sent a letter to then-President George W. Bush, recommending that Vennes be pardoned for his crimes. She later withdrew her letter after Vennes' home was raided by federal agents in connection with the Petters Ponzi scheme.

== 2013 Tom Petters Ponzi scheme sentencing ==
On September 24, 2008, Vennes' Shorewood, Minnesota home was raided by federal agents in connection with an investigation of Minnesota businessman Tom Petters' $3.5 billion Ponzi scheme. In a basement vault, agents discovered stacks of $100 bills, buckets and boxes of gold and silver coins, boxes of gem stones, trays of jewelry and Rolex watches.

In April 2011, Vennes was indicted in federal court on charges of fraudulently marketing a hedge fund's investments in Petters Company, Inc. (PCI). The indictment alleged that Vennes engaged in 748 transactions involving hundreds of millions of dollars from 1999 through September 2008, and made more than $140 million through investments and commissions. On July 19, 2011, Vennes was charged with eight counts of securities fraud, six counts of wire fraud, three counts of money laundering, two counts of mail fraud, three counts of bank fraud, and two counts of making false statements on credit applications.
