= Sun Country Airlines =

Ultra-low-cost airline of the United States

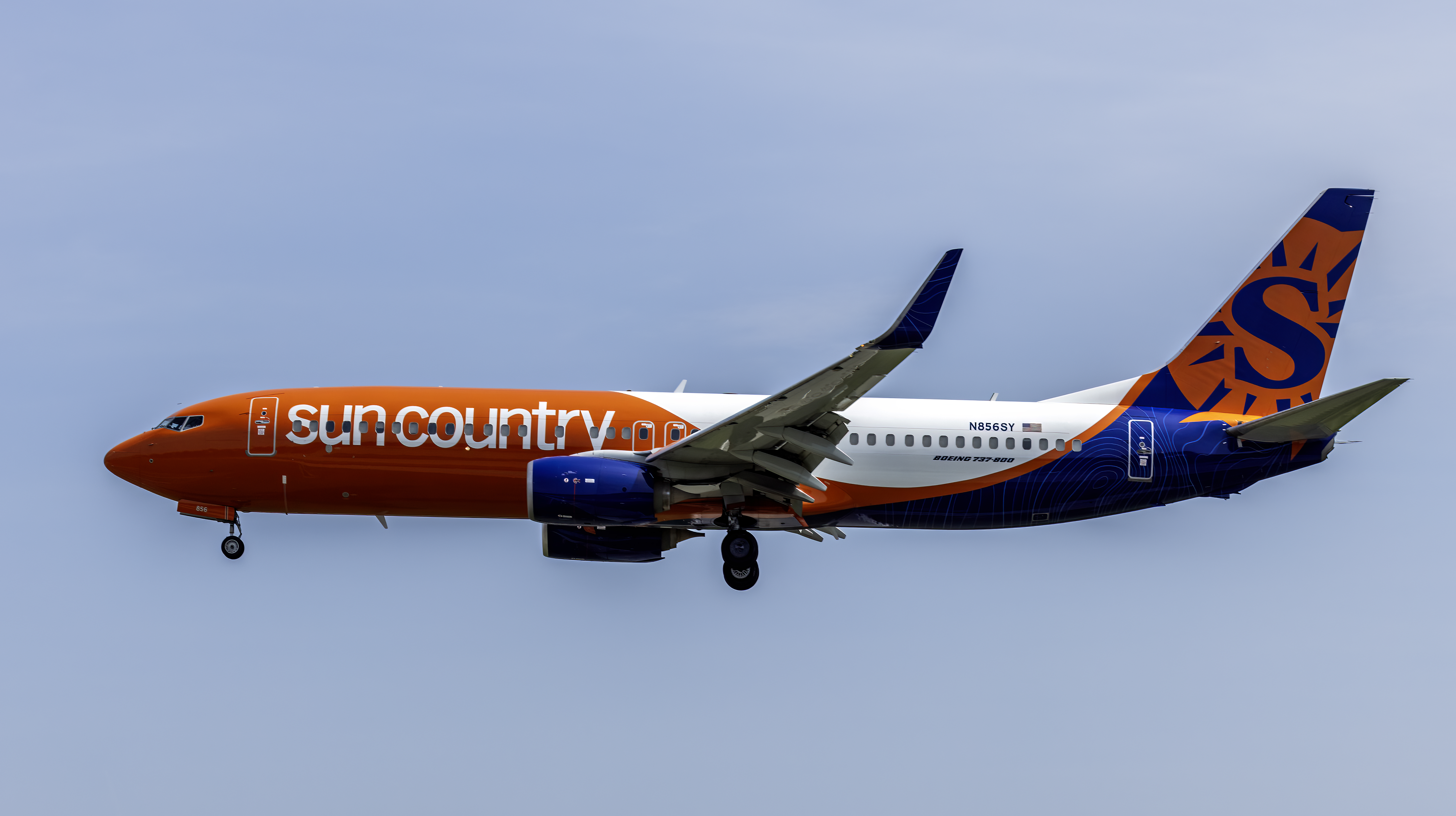
- Sun Country Airlines Boeing 737-800
IATA	ICAO	Call sign
SY	SCX	SUN COUNTRY
- Founded: July 2, 1982; 44 years ago
- Commenced operations: January 20, 1983; 43 years ago
- AOC #: SCNA220K
- Operating bases: Cincinnati; Minneapolis/St. Paul
- Frequent-flyer program: Sun Country Rewards
- Fleet size: 67
- Destinations: 172
- Parent company: Allegiant Travel Company
- Traded as: Nasdaq: SNCY
- Headquarters: Minneapolis, Minnesota, United States
- Key people: Jude Bricker (CEO); Dave Davis (President & CFO); Jennifer Vogel (Chair)
- Revenue: ▲US$1.1 billion (2025)
- Operating income: ▼US$101 million (2025)
- Net income: ▼US$53 million (2025)
- Total assets: ▲US$1.7 billion (2025)
- Total equity: ▲US$625 million (2025)
- Employees: ▲3,281 (2025)
- Website: suncountry.com

Notes
- Financials as of December 31, 2025. References

Sun Country Airlines is an ultra-low-cost airline in the United States. Based at Minneapolis–Saint Paul International Airport with headquarters on airport property, Sun Country flies to around 140 destinations in the United States, Canada, Mexico, Central America and the Caribbean. The airline also runs significant charter operations and operates cargo for Amazon Air.

Allegiant Travel Company acquired Sun Country on May 13, 2026, and plans to fold all operations into the Allegiant Air brand while maintaining a significant presence at Minneapolis–St. Paul. Allegiant and Sun Country continue to operate separately while working toward a single operating certificate.

== History ==
One version of Sun Country's early logo used from 1996–2001.

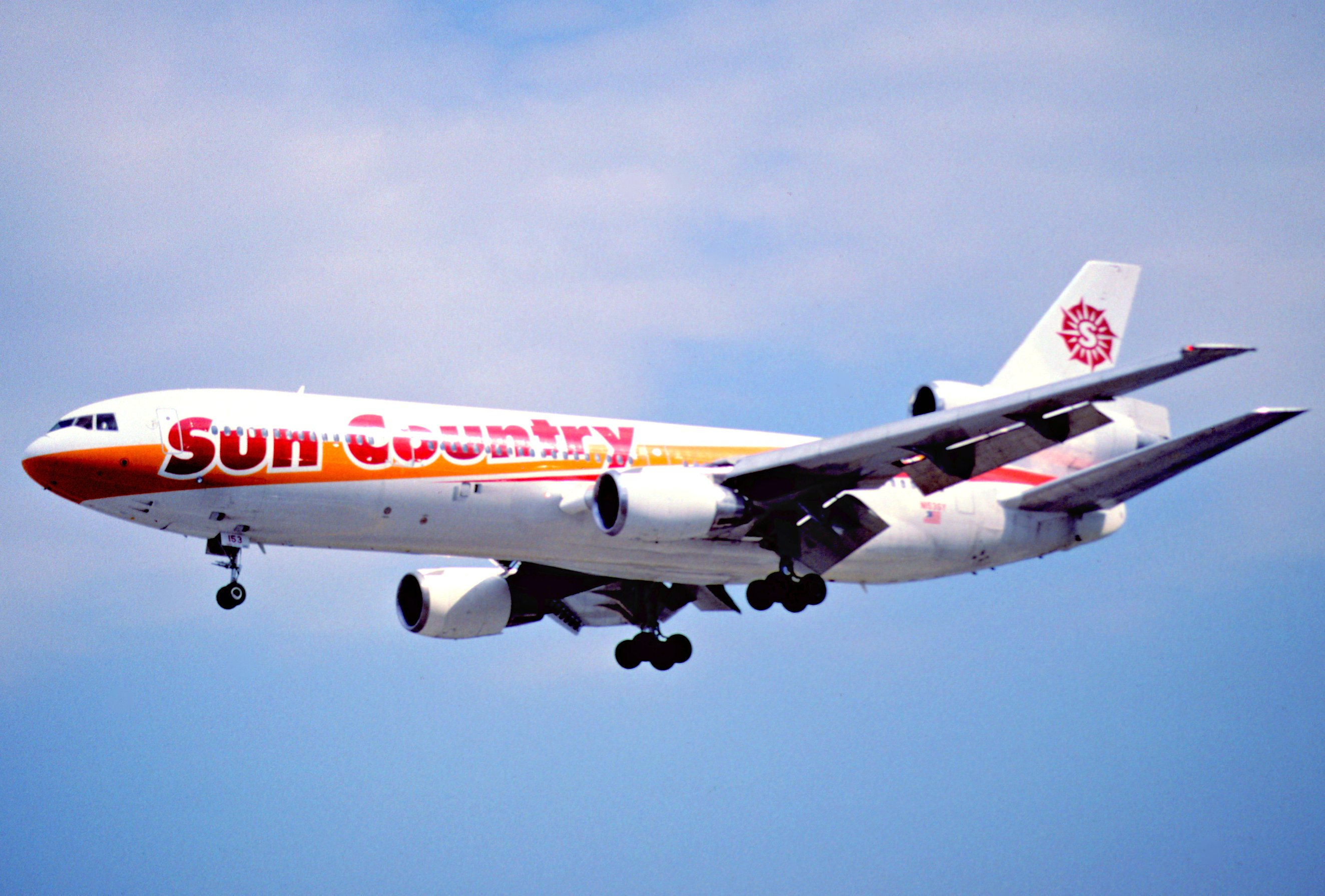
McDonnell Douglas DC-10-10, 1998

=== Early years and bankruptcies (1983–2001) ===
Sun Country was incorporated on July 2, 1982, and received its certificate of public necessity and convenience from the Civil Aeronautics Board on January 17, 1983. The airline began charter operations shortly afterward, with its first revenue flight operating on January 20, 1983, between Sioux Falls and Las Vegas using a Boeing 727 leased from Air Florida.

The airline's original staff included 16 pilots, 16 flight attendants, three mechanics, and one office employee. Several early employees had previously worked for Braniff International Airways, which ceased operations in 1982. Captain Jim Olsen served as the company's founder, president, chief executive officer, and chief pilot, while his wife Joan Smith-Olsen led inflight operations.

By 1988, the airline's headquarters were located at Minneapolis–Saint Paul International Airport. Scheduled passenger service began in 1995 with flights from Minneapolis to several major cities. Financial difficulties led the airline to suspend operations in 2001.

=== Petters Group Worldwide ownership (2006–2008) ===
Sun Country was acquired out of bankruptcy in 2006 by Petters Group Worldwide and Whitebox Advisors. Stan Gadek, the former CFO of AirTran Airways was named CEO. The airline faced financial strain during the Great Recession and after revelations that Petters Group had operated a $3.25 billion Ponzi scheme.

Rising fuel costs led the airline to furlough 45 of its 156 pilots and reduce its summer schedule in 2008. The airline also reduced service to San Francisco and Los Angeles and introduced fees for checked bags. Later that year, Gadek requested a 50 percent pay deferral for remaining employees. In September 2008, Petters Group CEO Tom Petters resigned after an FBI investigation uncovered large-scale financial fraud involving Petters Group. Sun Country filed for Chapter 11 bankruptcy protection for a second time on October 6, 2008.

=== Rebuilding and Davis brothers ownership (2011–2017) ===
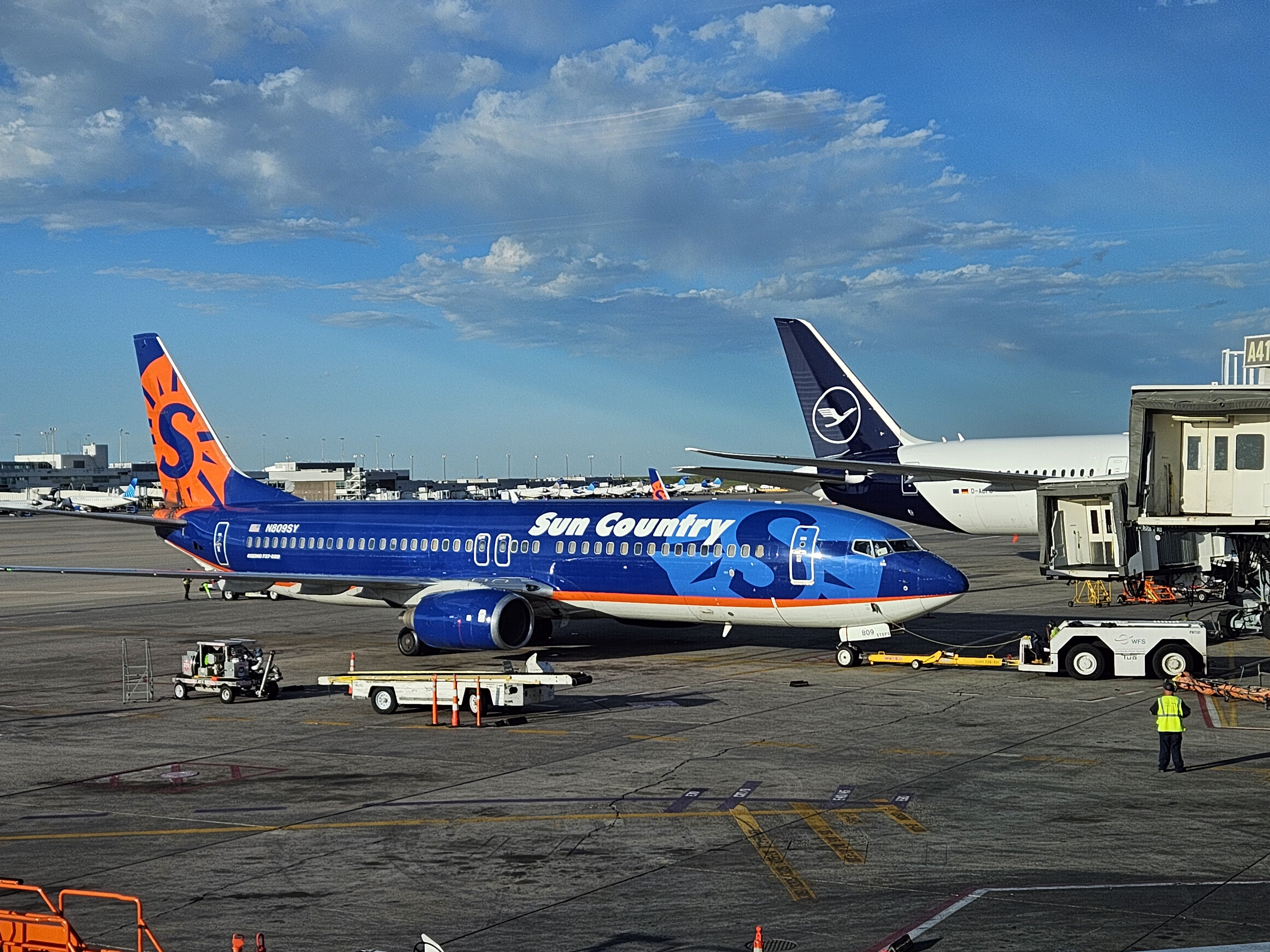
Boeing 737 in the 2001–2016 livery at Denver

The Davis family, owners of Cambria, acquired Sun Country out of bankruptcy in July 2011 for $34 million. Cambria chief executive Marty Davis became chairman.

Sun Country appointed Zarir Erani as president and CEO in 2015. The airline reported net income of $27 million in 2015, followed by a decline to $16 million in 2016.

In July 2017, after more than a year of missed earnings projections, Erani was replaced by former Allegiant Air executive Jude Bricker as CEO. Under Bricker's leadership, Sun Country began shifting toward an ultra-low-cost carrier model.

=== Apollo Global Management ownership (2017–2025) ===
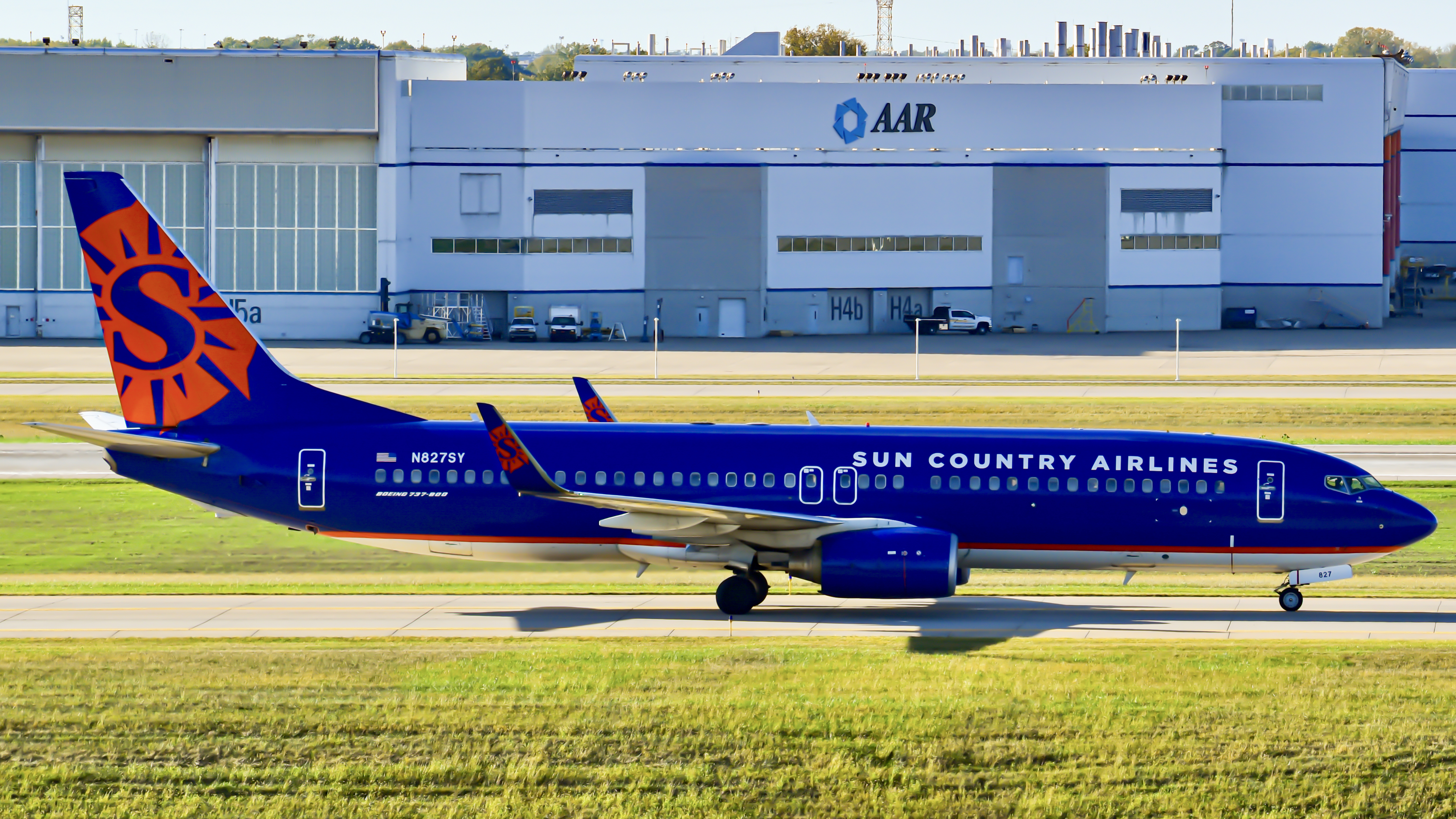
A Boeing 737-800 in the 2016–2018 livery at Indianapolis

Under Bricker's leadership, Sun Country transitioned from private to public ownership, navigated the COVID-19 pandemic, and shifted toward an ultra-low-cost carrier business model. During this period, the airline improved its profitability, expanded its scale of operations, and pursued strategies intended to reduce exposure to the volatility of the airline industry.

Funds affiliated with the private equity firm Apollo Global Management acquired Sun Country in December 2017 for an undisclosed amount. In December 2019, Amazon Air purchased a minority stake in the airline from Apollo and announced plans for Sun Country to operate cargo flights on Amazon's behalf. Sun Country initially operated ten cargo aircraft for Amazon and launched its first cargo flight in May 2020.

Sun Country became a publicly traded company on March 17, 2021, listing on the NASDAQ under the ticker symbol SNCY.

By June 2024, the airline operated 12 cargo aircraft under contract with Amazon Air. The two companies later extended their agreement through 2030, with Amazon agreeing to transfer eight additional Boeing 737-800BCF aircraft to Sun Country, increasing the cargo fleet to 20 aircraft.

Apollo Global sold its remaining shares in Sun Country through a secondary public offering in February 2025.

=== Acquisition by Allegiant Travel Company (2026) ===
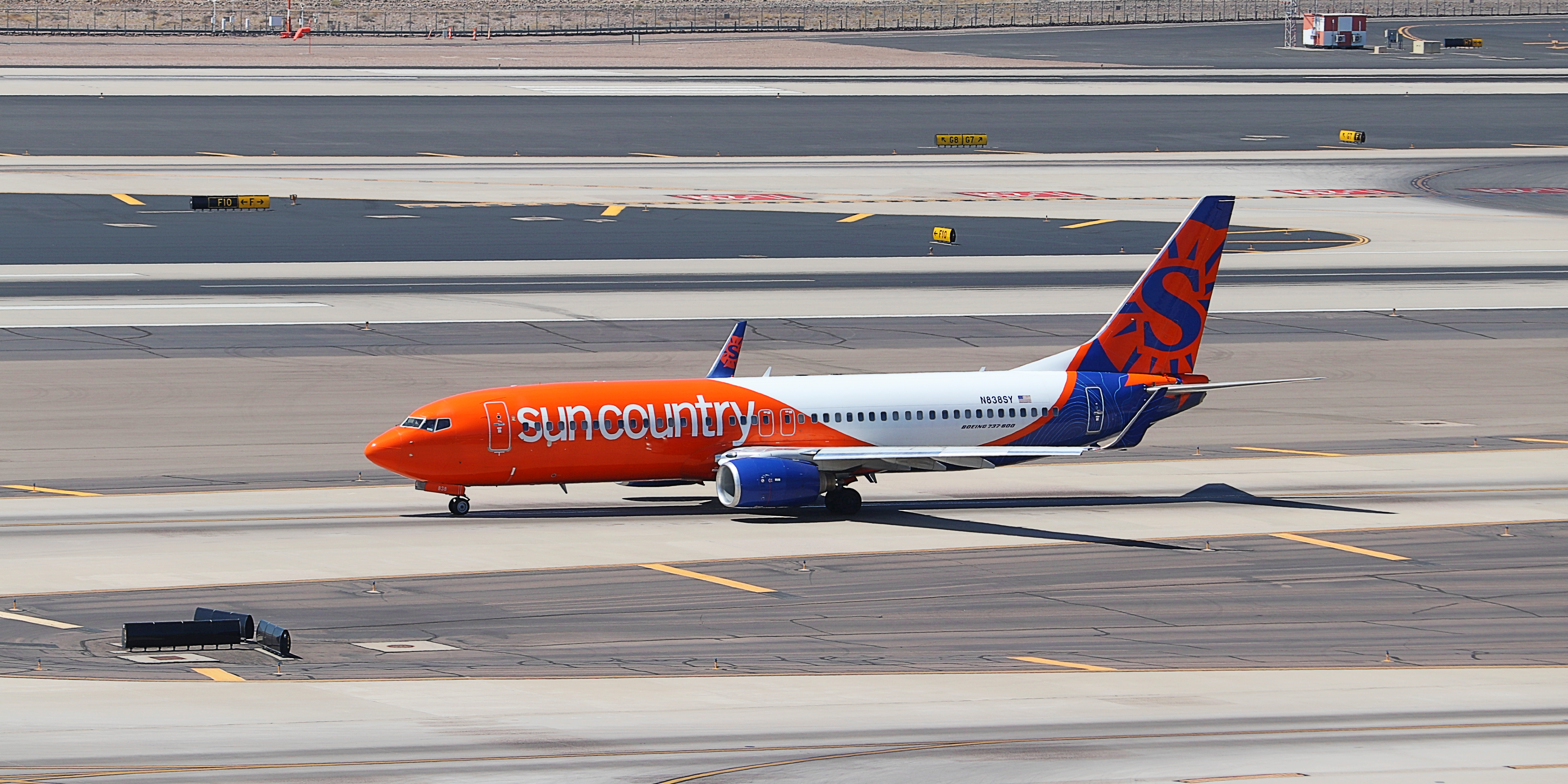
Boeing 737-800 in the 2018–2026 livery at Phoenix–Sky Harbor in 2026

Allegiant Travel Company, parent company of Allegiant Air, announced on January 11, 2026, that it had reached an agreement to acquire Sun Country for approximately $1.5 billion. Under the agreement, Allegiant would assume Sun Country's operations, including its employees, aircraft, routes, charter operations, debt obligations, and cargo contracts. The combined airline would operate under the Allegiant brand. The combined airline would maintain significant operations at Minneapolis–Saint Paul.

The United States Department of Transportation approved the merger on April 15, 2026, and shareholders of both airlines approved the transaction on May 8, 2026. The transaction closed on May 13, 2026.

Following the merger, Allegiant shareholders owned approximately 67 percent of the combined company, while Sun Country shareholders owned the remaining 33 percent. Sun Country CEO Jude Bricker and chairwoman Jennifer Vogel joined the board of directors of the combined company.

Allegiant and Sun Country will continue to operate separately while working toward a single operating certificate.

== Corporate affairs ==
=== Business trends ===
The key trends for Sun Country Airlines were (as of the end of the calendar year):

Year	Revenue (in million US$)	Net income (in million US$)	Employees (FTE)	Passengers (in millions)	Load factor (%)	Aircraft	Ref
2009	202	1					
2010	239	11			70		
2011	308	4					
2012	361	15					
2013	410	2					
2014		2	1,312	1.6	72.6	19	
2015		27		1.9	80.2		
2016	518	16		1.8	78.5		
2017	560	28	1,889	2.5	80.4	26	
2018	197	25.9	1,549	2.6	82.4	30	(Note: 2018: Because of the restructuring of the business, financials for 2018 were reported as 'Predecessor' activity (January 1 through April 10) and 'Successor' activity (April 11 through December 31))
2018	385	(0.4)	1,549	2.6	82.4	30	(Note: 2018: Because of the restructuring of the business, financials for 2018 were reported as 'Predecessor' activity (January 1 through April 10) and 'Successor' activity (April 11 through December 31))
2019	701	46	1,532	3.6	82.5	31	
2020	401	(3.9)	1,699	1.7	64.9	43	(Note: 2020: Activities in fiscal 2020 were severely reduced by the impact of the coronavirus pandemic)
2021	623	81.2	2,181	2.7	74.7	48	
2022	894	17.7	2,510	3.6	83.5	54	
2023	1,050	72.2	2,783	4.1	86.3	42	
2024	1,076	52.9	3,141	4.5	84.2	45	
2025	1,127	52.8	3,281	4.2	83.6	47	

=== Services ===
Sun Country previously offered two classes of service with First Class and Economy seats, but when the airline was sold to Apollo Global Management, it became an ultra low-cost carrier with aircraft operated in an all-economy configuration. Sun Country now offers three variations of economy seats: Best, Exit Row, and Standard.

Sun Country Rewards, the airline's frequent-flyer program, was established in 2018, replacing an older program called Ufly. In 2023, Sun Country was named the best low-cost carrier in North America at the Paris Airshow's World Airline Rankings.

== Destinations ==
As of January 2024, Sun Country Airlines flies to 81 destinations and operates more than 100 routes throughout the Caribbean, United States, Canada, Mexico and Central America. Many Sun Country destinations are seasonally served as demand grows and falls throughout the year.

The airline additionally provides charter service for the United States Armed Forces and NCAA football teams. The airline has provided charter service to Major League Soccer teams since 2020 and became the league's official carrier in 2022. Sun Country has a number of casino charter contracts.

Top domestic markets (August 2024 – July 2025)
Rank	Airport	Passengers	Market share (%)
1	Minneapolis/St. Paul, Minnesota	1,874,450	11.71%
2	Orlando, Florida	160,090	0.68%
3	Fort Myers, Florida	159,230	3.04%
4	Phoenix, Arizona	157,350	0.63%
5	Las Vegas, Nevada	147,500	0.58%
	Other markets	1,364,620	0.15%

=== Interline agreements ===
Sun Country also has interline agreements with the following airlines:

- China Airlines
- Condor
- Emirates
- EVA Air
- Hawaiian Airlines
- Icelandair

== Fleet ==
=== Current fleet ===
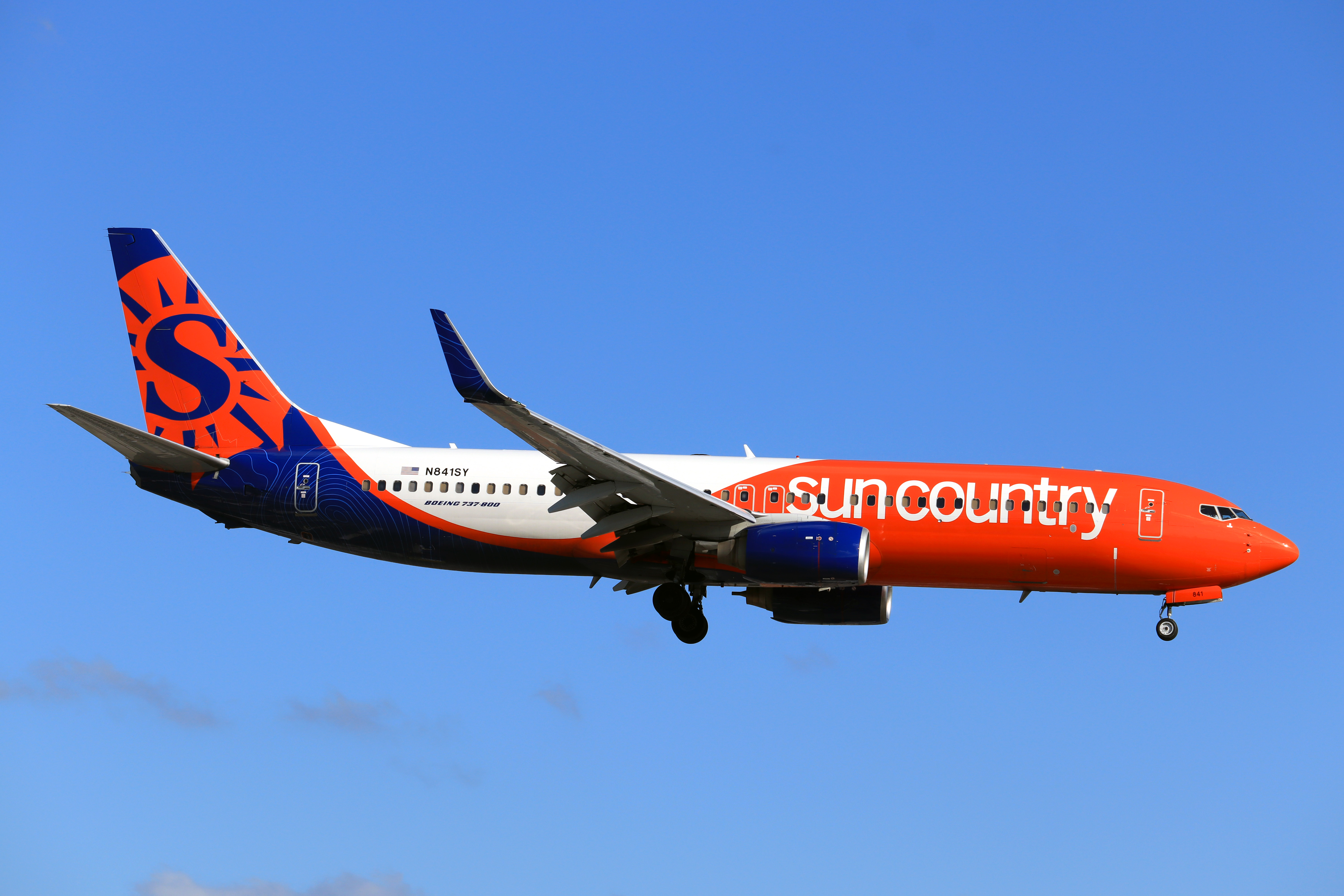
Boeing 737-800 wearing the newest livery, affectionately nicknamed the "Tide Pod" livery

Boeing 737-900ER

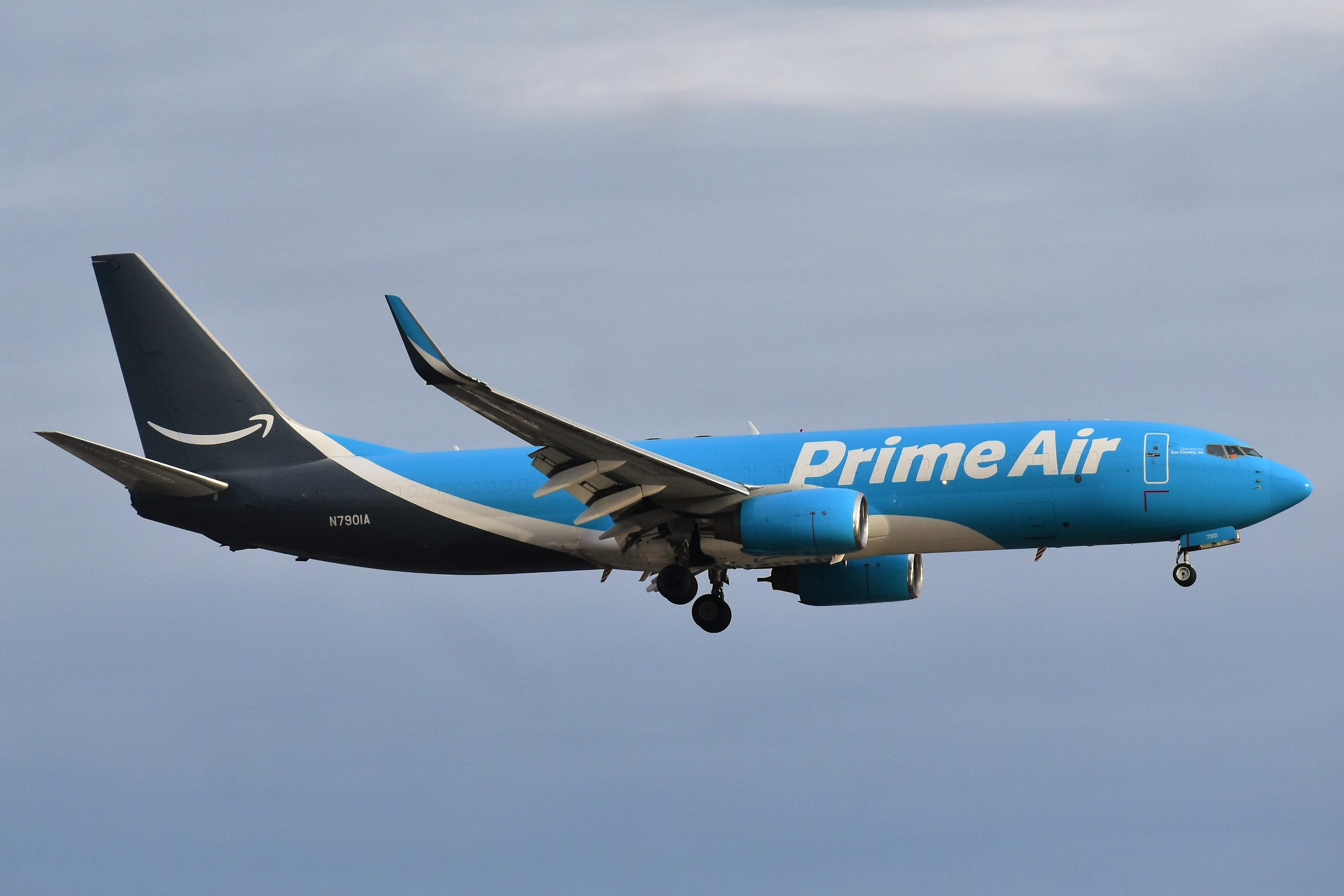
Boeing 737-800BCF operated for Amazon Air, with Sun Country titles behind the cockpit windows

As of December 2025, Sun Country Airlines operates an all-Boeing 737 fleet composed of the following aircraft:

Aircraft	In service	On order	Passengers				Notes
Aircraft	In service	On order	F	Y+	Y	Total	Notes
Passenger fleet
Boeing 737-800	43	1	—	27	159	186	
Boeing 737-800	1	—	68	—	—	68	
Boeing 737-900ER	3	2	—	27	159	186	
Cargo fleet
Boeing 737-800BCF	20	—	Cargo				Operated for Amazon Air.
Total	67	3					

=== Historical fleet ===
Sun Country Airlines historical fleet
Aircraft	Total	Introduced	Retired	Notes
Boeing 727-200	42	1983	2002	
Boeing 737-700	9	2008	2023	
McDonnell Douglas DC-10-10	6	1993	1998	
McDonnell Douglas DC-10-15	4	1994	2001	
McDonnell Douglas DC-10-30F	2	1995	1997	Leased from Gemini Air Cargo.
McDonnell Douglas DC-10-40	1	1986	1991	Transferred to Northwest Airlines.

== See also ==
- Air transportation in the United States
