= Charlene Corley =

American defense contractor and fraudster

Charlene Shuler Corley
- Occupation: Former defense contractor
- Known for: Defrauding the U.S. Department of Defense of over $21.5 million
- Status: Convicted
- Convictions: 2007
- Criminal charges: Conspiracy to commit wire fraud money laundering
- Penalty: 78 months in prison $15.5 million in restitution
- Accomplice: Darlene Shuler Wooten (sister)

Details
- Imprisoned at: Federal Correctional Institution (FCI); 2007 - February 7, 2015

Charlene Shuler Corley is a former defense contractor who was convicted in 2007 on two counts of conspiracy. Over the course of nine years leading up to September 2006, the company owned by Corley and her sister was found to have received over US$21.5 million from the United States Department of Defense for fraudulent shipping costs; in one instance, the company was paid US$998,798 for shipping two 19-cent washers. In 2009, Corley was sentenced to 78 months in prison and ordered to pay US$15.5 million in restitution.

== Crime ==
Along with her twin sister Darlene Shuler Wooten, Corley was the co-owner of C&D Distributors, a supplier of small hardware components, plumbing fixtures and electronic equipment to the military. The company, based in Lexington, South Carolina, used a computerized government system that allowed shipping costs for each order to be submitted separately and automatically reimbursed. Using the system, C&D Distributors received payment from the Department of Defense on 112 fraudulent invoices, totaling US$20.5 million in illegitimate charges, for parts sent to priority military installations, including destinations in Iraq and Afghanistan. The fraud began in 1997 when a mistake on an invoice for shipping charges allowed C&D to make an unexpected profit of US$5,000. Although they returned the money, they discovered that due to a flaw in the system, they could charge any amount for shipping and the government would pay it, no questions asked.

Among the invoices submitted by C&D Distributors were:

- US$445,640 for shipping an $8.75 elbow pipe
- US$492,096 for shipping a $10.99 machine thread plug
- US$403,436 for shipping six machine screws worth a total of $59.94

The scheme was discovered in September 2006 when the system red-flagged an invoice for over US$998,000 in shipping charges for washers that only cost 19 cents. A review by a person discovered several of the exorbitant charges. According to a Pentagon spokesman, the system has been modified to safeguard against similar exploitation in the future.

== Aftermath ==
In October 2006, Darlene Wooten committed suicide after being approached by federal investigators. She left behind a suicide note and a check made out to the Department of Defense for US$4.5 million.

Corley and C&D Distributors pled guilty in August 2007 to two conspiracy charges to commit wire fraud and money laundering, each charge carrying a maximum sentence of twenty years. She was freed on bond until sentencing. In March 2009, she was sentenced to the minimum recommendation of six and a half years in federal prison. The judge rejected Corley's request to serve the time in a halfway house. Corley was also ordered to pay US$15.5 million in restitution, at a minimum rate of US$300 per month.

Corley claimed that Wooten had been more responsible for the scheme and had received more benefit. During the sentencing, Corley's attorneys asked the judge to consider Corley's clean criminal history and her record of community service. They presented a video featuring eight Corley supporters, including several from Pineview Elementary School, where Corley had become a mentor to an autistic child. The boy's mother and grandmother testified in court about their immense appreciation for the help Corley had given their family, and the mother said that she would bring her son to visit Corley wherever she went. Corley herself told the court, "I messed up really bad. I'm sorry. I'm desperately ashamed".

Following the guilty plea, Corley's possessions stemming from the fraud became subject to seizure by the South Carolina United States Attorney's office. Corley's spending had included, according to various news reports, at least six pieces of property including four beach homes at Edisto Island; a collection of ten cars including a BMW, a Lexus, and matching Mercedes-Benzes; expensive jewelry and vacations; five businesses, including a cookie store; and a US$250,000 luxury box at the football stadium of Clemson University, Corley's alma mater. Deborah B. Barbier, a prosecutor on behalf of the U.S. Government at Corley's sentencing, claimed the list of assets spanned "ten pages, single-spaced".

Corley served her 78-month sentence at the Federal Correctional Institution (FCI) – Marianna in Marianna, Florida. With time off for good behavior, she was released on February 7, 2015.

The scam was profiled on CNBC's American Greed and ID's Evil Twins.
