= Mehmet Aydın (born 1991) =

Turkish fraudster (born 1991)

- Born: 31 May 1991 (age 35); Nilüfer, Bursa
- Other names: Eren Çakar (fake name); Egoman (rapper nickname); Tosuncuk (criminal nickname, literally "Little Fattie")
- Occupations: Rapper; Entrepreneur
- Years active: 2016–2018
- Known for: Çiftlik Bank
- Spouse: Sıla Soysal (m. 2017; div. 2018)
- Status: Charged
- Motive: Financial gain
- Criminal charges: IT fraud, money laundering and starting a criminal organization
- Penalty: 45,000 years in prison
- Capture status: Captured
- Wanted since: 2018

Details
- Country: Turkey
- Target: Investors

Mehmet Aydın (born May 31, 1991) is a former Turkish rapper, under the pseudonym Egoman, who is now under investigation for a criminal fraud. In August 2016, he allegedly developed his scam app which allowed users to invest in virtual livestock. It eventually had over 350,000 domestic investors and another 150,000 abroad. It is believed he had scammed 1.6 billion Turkish lira from 132,000 people in a single year before disappearing. In 2021, Sedat Peker claimed that Aydın had allies in the Turkish state making sure he would not be brought to justice. Shortly after that, Aydın surrendered to the Turkish embassy in São Paulo. 48 suspects have been indicted in for infamous Çiftlik Bank case, suspects faced prison terms adding up to 75,000 years, including Mehmet Aydın.

== Life ==
=== Personal life ===
Originally from Espiye, Aydın was born in Nilüfer, Bursa. He has one brother. He married Sıla Soysal in 2017 before divorcing in 2018. Despite being born in Turkey to Muslim parents, he did not ever state being Muslim.

=== Grand FarmBank fraud ===
In August 2016, Aydın founded a Ponzi scheme company in Northern Cyprus called "Çiftlik Bank." He developed FarmBank (Çiftlik Bank) with the promise of making profit for all investors. Farm Bank investors downloaded the game and invested in "virtual animals and produce." FarmBank had over 350,000 domestic investors and another 150,000 abroad. Turkey's financial regulators filed a complaint at the end of 2017 after users complained about broken promises.

Aydın scammed 1.6 billion Turkish lira (about US$187 million) from 132,000 people in a single year before going into hiding. His wife and some of the executives of his companies were detained, while Aydın was spotted in Uruguay driving a Ferrari.

Aydın and other founders of the company faced charges of running a criminal organization, online fraud and money laundering. 48 suspects have been indicted in for infamous Çiftlik Bank case, suspects faced prison terms adding up to 75,000 years, including Mehmet Aydın.

The court charged suspects with multiple counts of fraud while 3,762 people are named as plaintiffs. Assets of the three companies linked to Çiftlik Bank were seized and authorities confiscated 3.9 million lira "obtained through criminal means."

With the execution decree published in the Official Gazette on April 18, 2020, it was stated that Mehmet Aydın, the founder of Çiftlikbank, nicknamed "Tosuncuk," could not benefit from the execution discount.

=== Search and surrender ===
According to reports, victims of the scam who "seek revenge" have offered a $350,000 reward for the capture, dead or alive, of Aydın. Posters offering the reward have been put up in Uruguay and around Kyiv, where Aydın was rumoured to have moved to after spending years in Uruguay. Reports said he had secured safe passage in his girlfriend's home country after bribing Ukrainian officials.

In 2021, Sedat Peker claimed that Aydın had allies in the Turkish state ensuring he was not being brought to justice. Shortly after Peker's statements, On 30 June 2021, Aydın announced he would surrender to the Turkish government in a video he released, and surrendered to the Turkish Embassy in São Paulo on 1 July 2021.

Mehmet Aydın was tried for the crime of "Violation of the Banking Law No. 5411" for using the name 'Bank' in the Çiftlik Bank system. He defended himself saying :"One of the meanings of the word "bank" in the dictionary of the Turkish language is a seat used in parks and gardens. I may have meant the seat, I may have meant something else, not my fault if they misunderstood".
