= Juliette D'Souza =

British scammer

Juliette D'Souza (born circa 1959), also known by aliases Maryan Lesley Persaud, Jacqueline McSherry and Vanessa Campbell, was convicted of some of the most large scale frauds by a female in British history. For over 12 years she styled herself as a shaman, able to bring people luck and good health, recover from incurable cancer and cure infertility. She stole over £3 million from a circle of North London residents, threatening to curse them with death and disease if they did not continue to pay. D'Souza was arrested in 2012 and jailed for ten years in 2014. The judge at her trial noted that she has fraud convictions going back to the 1980s. She has a known criminal record for scamming in Surinam, as well as the UK.

== Background ==
D'Souza was born circa 1959 in Guyana and had been a cleaner. In London she presented herself as a barrister, the daughter of high court judges, who had graduated from Oxford University. She befriended isolated, old and ill people, drawing them into her confidence over many months. Her eventual arrest focused on the scamming of a group of wealthy people in London's Hampstead neighbourhood. However, it is likely that there were many victims beyond the ones identified by the police. When she had grown close to those she had chosen to defraud, she confided to them that she was a shaman and close to powerful indigenous healers in Amazonian Suriname. She said that they could read the future and predict coming illnesses such as cancer, and avert that outcome if a sacrificial, monetary price was paid. She said she worked with a healer “Papa Freddie” in Surinam and that he would perform rituals to bring better luck and good health.

From 1994, D'Souza groomed Hampstead osteopath Keith Bender. She befriended him over many months, and he, in turn, introduced her to his clients and friends. She said that she foresaw cancer in Bender's future, extorting money from him in return for shamanic healing. She defrauded millions of pounds from his social circle. Bender leased four flats in Willowby Rd, Hampstead on her behalf and got himself into debt, under the threat of being cursed. When she did not pay her rent, Bender and the landlord forced entry to the flat and found nine freezers of rotting meat, plus satanic objects, burned photos and rooms full of luxury goods. It was described as "the house of a psychopath”. They also found a damaged capuchin monkey in a cage, which was later cared for by the RSPCA in Cornwall and then rehomed with Stephen Fry. D'Souza had many other flats in across Hampstead, in Perrin's Lane, Denning Road, Rosslyn Hill and Heath Street; and also in West Hampstead, Belsize Park, Kensington and St John's Wood.

The group of Hampstead victims went to local police, who stated that they would not to investigate as it was a civil case. The residents estimated that they lost to her £3-7 million, but the total beyond that circle is likely to be much higher. London Times Journalist Tim Rayment led a nine-month investigation, going to Surinam to find D'Souza, but he was treated as suspect by local police.

In London, D'Souza posed as a government HMRC tax official while trying to defraud further people, and was reported to the police for this crime. She was arrested in 2012 and brought to trial at Blackfriars Crown Court in 2014. She stated that Bender had designed the shamanic scam and that she had never posed as a healer.

"D’Souza, 59, was convicted of 23 counts of obtaining property by deception and fraud relating to victims preyed upon between 1998 and 2010. Judge Ian Karsten QC, who handed her a 10-year sentence, said it was the 'worst case of confidence fraud I have ever had to deal with, or indeed that I have ever heard of' ".

Detective Superintendent Richard Tucker stated: “D’Souza is one of the most wicked criminals I have ever come across...She made a conscious decision over many years to prey on people who were at a very vulnerable point in their lives. In all that time she demonstrated not one ounce of basic humanity.” In court the judge gave a list of D'Souza's previous fraud convictions, starting in the 1980s; She had 32 convictions for fraud and theft and had served a sentence in Holloway Prison during this time. She also had convictions in Surinam. A group of Filipino women at the court said that she had conned them out of hundreds of thousands of pounds in a passport scam. Her current whereabouts are not reported.
