= Tom Petters =

American businessman and fraudster

- Born: July 11, 1957 (age 69); St. Cloud, Minnesota, U.S.
- Occupation: former CEO of Petters Group Worldwide
- Children: One daughter, three sons
- Status: Prisoner #14170-041 in Federal Correctional Institution, Milan
- Convictions: 10 counts of wire fraud 3 counts of mail fraud 1 count of conspiracy to commit mail and wire fraud 1 count of conspiracy to commit money laundering 5 counts of money laundering
- Penalty: 50 years in prison

Thomas Joseph Petters is a former American businessman and chairman and CEO of Petters Group Worldwide, a company which stole over $2 billion in a Ponzi scheme. He was convicted of massive business fraud in 2009 and was imprisoned at the United States Penitentiary, Leavenworth. Amid mounting criminal investigations, Petters resigned as his company's CEO on September 29, 2008. He was convicted of numerous federal crimes for operating Petters Group Worldwide as a $3.65 billion Ponzi scheme and received a 50-year federal sentence.

== Early years ==
Petters was raised with six siblings in St. Cloud, Minnesota. He worked at the tailor, fur and fabric shop founded by his great-grandfather and operated by his family for over 100 years. In 1973, while still in high school, he started Ear Electronics, a mail-order stereo company aimed at college students. Petters completed only one semester of college before dropping out to pursue a career. In the early 1980s, Petters worked in Colorado as a regional manager at an electronics store chain; when that business went bankrupt, he purchased five of its locations in Colorado and Kansas.

== Petters Group Worldwide ==
In 1988, Petters moved back to Minnesota and founded Amicus Trading, a wholesale brokerage; the name was later changed to The Petters Company, and it marketed consumer merchandise. In 1995 he started Petters Warehouse Direct to sell closeout, overstock and bankrupt company merchandise from a store in Minnetonka, Minnesota, and later in the Twin Cities and greater Minnesota. In 1998, he moved online to sell discounted merchandise through redtag.com, operated by RedTag Inc.; by 2000 he sold his Petters Warehouse Direct stores to focus on his online business, based in Eden Prairie, Minnesota. He teamed up with direct-mail merchandise company Fingerhut Companies Inc. in 2001 to start a new online store, Redtagbiz.com, which reported sales of $1 billion per year at one point.

Between 1998 and 2008, Petters created a series of investment funds through which he raised in excess of $4 billion through a variety of Ponzi schemes. These fund family names included Arrowhead, Lancelot, Palm Beach and Stewardship. Through these funds, Petters perpetrated the third-largest hedge fund fraud case in U.S. history. Petters used these funds to finance his big box and other acquisitions. He then fabricated retail orders from those acquisitions and used them as collateral to borrow more money through the funds.

When Fingerhut's owner, Federated Department Stores, decided to sell or close the company in 2002, Petters teamed with former Fingerhut chairman Ted Deikel to buy the Fingerhut name, customer list, and buildings in St. Cloud, Minnetonka, and Plymouth, Minnesota and Tennessee. The acquisition closed in June 2002, and all of Petters's operations moved into Fingerhut's former headquarters in Minnetonka. Deikel assumed direction of Fingerhut Direct Marketing Inc., which created catalogs, and Petters operated Fingerhut Fulfillment, based at a St. Cloud distribution center. The new Fingerhut restarted with online and catalog sales in November 2002. In April 2003, The Petters Group, with two minority investors, purchased uBid. The same month, Fingerhut Direct Inc. announced it had obtained a $100 million line of credit to finance inventory and receivables. In 2003, Petters invested in Nazca Solutions, whose CEO was Ted Mondale. Deikel sold his interest in Fingerhut in 2004.

In January 2005, Petters Group Worldwide purchased the Polaroid brand for $426 million, with plans to use it on consumer electronics and new technologies. In 2006, Petters Group Worldwide acquired Sun Country Airlines. Petters Group Worldwide became a diverse holding company with 3,200 employees and investments or full ownership in 60 companies, of which it actively managed 20. With offices in North America, South America, Asia, and Europe, it had $2.3 billion in revenue in 2007.

== Prosecution, conviction and sentencing ==
Circa 2008, the FBI began investigating Petters for his role in a fraud scheme involving more than $100 million in investments. On September 24, 2008, federal investigators raided the Petters headquarters in Minnetonka and searched Tom Petters' Wayzata home. Documents released by the FBI, IRS, and other federal agencies noted that they were seeking evidence of a scheme to lure investors into funding a company based on tens of millions of dollars in purchases and sales that never occurred. The documents noted that a witness associated with Petters and his company came forward with documents and other information, and later wore a hidden microphone and recorded several conversations involving Petters and others who carried out the fraud. The affidavit alleges that Petters repeatedly admitted to the fraud scheme of providing false information to investors in the tapes; in addition, Petters admitted to falsifying his tax returns. On September 29, he resigned as the head of Petters Group Worldwide.

On October 3, Petters was arrested at his home in Wayzata. He was denied bail after prosecutors produced documents that alleged Petters had encouraged another person involved with the case to leave the country, that Petters had stated that he regretted turning over his passport, and that he had previously spoken about fleeing the country if the fraudulent scheme were discovered. The U.S. Attorney's Office charged him with mail fraud, wire fraud, money laundering and obstruction of justice.

The U.S. Attorney staff noted that the government knew nothing about the scheme until Deanna Coleman, vice president of operations for Petters Co., approached them to confess and offered to help federal authorities investigate. This led to the prosecution of Robert Dean White, who admitted to being involved in creating false bank statements and other documents that were used to trick investors in what he described as a massive Ponzi scheme. Both individuals made plea bargains with federal prosecutors in exchange for providing the government information on how the scheme worked. Coleman and White related that, at the direction of Petters, they would fabricate documents for Petters and others to use in obtaining billions of dollars in loans. The phony records were used to show that Petters Co. was buying merchandise, generally electronic goods, from two suppliers (who were named as co-defendants). Petters Co. would tell lenders that it was selling the goods through big-box stores and provided purchase orders to substantiate the deals, but the deals were phony and the documents were fakes. Most of the money lent to PCI was secured by promissory notes and sometimes security agreements; the lenders would wire the money to the two suppliers, which would pass it on to Petters Co., less a commission. As more lenders loaned to Petters Co., outstanding loans would be paid off or rolled into new loans from the same lender. Proceeds went to Petters Co. and to Petters himself, and were used to fund other Petters-owned companies, to pay others collaborating in the scheme and, according to court affidavits, for Petters' "extravagant lifestyle."

Petters' legal troubles led to Sun Country Airlines filing for bankruptcy; the airline had been relying on an operating loan from Petters, who owned all the voting shares of Sun Country, to help the low-fare carrier pay its bills during the months of October and November 2008.

In addition, Frank E. Vennes Jr., the CEO and sole shareholder of Metro Gem, under a plea agreement, was sentenced to 180 months in prison for aiding and abetting misrepresentations and omissions to investors related to the PCI notes. Metro Gem held 38 outstanding PCI notes with a total principal (face value) of $130.3 million

The FBI Criminal Complaint identifies First Regional Bank, Los Angeles (Century City), California as the bank that moved more than 11 billion dollars through an account for Nationwide International Resources Inc. of Los Angeles. In a separate legal filing in February 2008, more than seven months before the Petters allegations surfaced, the Federal Deposit Insurance Corporation (FDIC) issued a cease and desist order citing First Regional Bank for failing to comply with regulations regarding money laundering with respect to Individual Retirement Accounts and violating rules regarding reporting suspicious activity.

On December 2, 2009, Tom Petters was found guilty in the U.S. District Court in St. Paul, Minnesota on 20 counts of conspiracy, wire and mail fraud. In April 2010, he was sentenced to 50 years in prison for his part in the fraud. Five other employees have pleaded guilty and are awaiting sentences. Petters' associate and primary fundraiser, Frank Vennes, has been charged with numerous counts of fraud and was sentenced to 15 years in prison.

Among the largest victims of the Petters scheme were Palm Beach Finance Partners, L.P. and Palm Beach Finance II, L.P., two South Florida hedge funds managed by Bruce F. Prevost and David W. Harrold, who each pleaded guilty to securities fraud in May 2011 for misrepresenting the funds' exposure to Petters' notes. The funds were placed into Chapter 11 bankruptcy in the United States Bankruptcy Court for the Southern District of Florida (Case No. 09-36379 ), with Barry Mukamal of Kapila Mukamal appointed as trustee. The liquidating trustee pursued extensive clawback and fraudulent transfer litigation, recovering a $49 million settlement from GE Capital and additional recoveries from financial institutions and intermediaries. Firms involved in the recovery litigation included Meland Budwick P.A., Greenberg Traurig LLP, Mark S. Roher, P.A. of South Florida, Genovese Joblove & Battista P.A., and Tabas Freedman, representing various creditor and investor interests throughout the proceedings.

After more than three years of refusing to speak with the media, Petters spoke with Twin Cities Business magazine Editor in Chief Dale Kurschner, who spent several hours inside Leavenworth prison interviewing him. In the interview, which was published in the magazine's May 2012 issue, Petters maintained his innocence. It remains Petters' only interview since his arrest. In May 2012, Petters also filed a petition asking the U.S. Supreme Court to review his conviction and sentence.

Petters was incarcerated at United States Penitentiary, Leavenworth in Leavenworth, Kansas. He was transferred to the Federal Correctional Institution, Milan a low security federal correctional institution in Milan, Michigan where he is currently incarcerated (as of 2026). His earliest possible release date is April 25, 2052, when he would be 94 years old.

== Philanthropy ==
Petters was appointed to the board of trustees for the College of St. Benedict in 2002; his mother had attended the school. In 2006 he gave $2 million for improvements to St. John's Abbey on the campus of adjacent Saint John's University. In light of the criminal prosecution, St. John's Abbey arranged to return the $2 million gift to the court-appointed receiver for the Petters bankruptcy. In October 2007, Petters made a $5.3 million gift to the College of St. Benedict to create the Thomas J. Petters Center for Global Education. In 2006, he served as a co-chairman of a capital campaign at his high school, Cathedral High School, and offered to match donations up to $750,000.

Petters formed the John T. Petters Foundation to provide gifts and endowments at select universities to benefit future college students. The foundation was formed to honor his son, John Thomas Petters, who was killed on a visit in 2004 to Florence, Italy. The college student inadvertently wandered onto private property where the owner, Alfio Raugei, mistook him for an intruder and stabbed him to death." In response, in September 2004, Tom Petters pledged $10 million to his late son's college, Miami University. He later promised an additional $4 million, with the total to support two professorships and the John T. Petters Center for Leadership, Ethics and Skills Development within the Farmer School of Business. Miami University has since returned Petters' donation following his conviction. Petters also donated $12 million to Rollins College in Winter Park, Florida, where he was a member of the Board of Trustees, to create two new faculty chairs in International Business.
