= Fingerhut =

American catalog and online retailer

The Fingerhut Companies, Inc.
- Type: Subsidiary
- Industry: Mail order, online shopping
- Founded: 1948; 78 years ago
- Founder: William and Manny Fingerhut
- Defunct: October 2, 2025
- Fate: Closure
- Headquarters: Saint Cloud, Minnesota, U.S.
- Revenue: US$500 million (2008)
- Owner: Bluestem Brands, Inc.
- Number of employees: 6,000 (2002)
- Website: www.fingerhut.com

Fingerhut was an American catalog and online retailer. The company was founded in 1948 specializing in automotive accessories before broadening into clothes, household and kitchen goods, cosmetics and collectibles before it went out of business in 2025. Fingerhut distinguished itself from traditional and online retail in that it incorporated a technique known as hire purchase, where customers paid with credit and made monthly payments until the order was fully paid.

== History ==
Fingerhut was founded in 1948 by William Fingerhut and his brother Manny, selling automobile seat covers. In 1952, the business repositioned itself as a mail-order catalog company and expanded its product offerings to include towels, dishes, and tools. In 1969, the company went public. The Fingerhut family was no longer involved in the business after 1979.

In 1994, Fingerhut sponsored the #98 NASCAR Ford Thunderbird for Cale Yarborough Motorsports. Derrike Cope started the year in the #98 car, before he was replaced later on by Jeremy Mayfield. In 1995, the company launched the e-commerce site fingerhut.com. By 1996, Fingerhut was one of the 25 largest credit card issuers in the United States.

The Fingerhut brand has undergone several ownership changes during its existence, including a one-time ownership by American Can Company (1979) and its successor Primerica, Federated Department Stores (1999), Petters Group Worldwide (2002), and Bain Capital Ventures (2004). Federated Department Stores Inc. (current Macy's, Inc.) acquired Fingerhut for 1.7 billion USD in 1999. Fingerhut's revenue was $1.7 billion USD for the fiscal year that ended in January 2001 (FY 2001). By 2000, Fingerhut had lost 400 million USD, and Federated Department Stores sold the company in 2002.

The company has received criticism for allegedly engaging in practices such as robocalls.

On March 9, 2020, the company's parent, Bluestem Brands, Inc., filed for Chapter 11 bankruptcy in the United States District Court for the District of Delaware.

The company began to wind down operations in August 2025, notifying the state of Minnesota and employees of WARN-notified layoffs at its Eden Prairie Corporate Headquarters on August 27. It then disclosed through another WARN notice the closure and layoff of all employees at its St. Cloud Distribution Center on September 18. Customers were then notified through online and physical letters towards the end of September and start of October that no new purchases could be made on existing accounts after October 2, and the site now notes that "Fingerhut is no longer open for shopping" as of that date, though regular payments to existing balances were still required.

The closure of Fingerhut came only months after another Eden Prairie-based online/home shopping retailer, ShopHQ, closed at the end of June 2025, two months after winding down its own online and on-air retailing operations.
