= Petters Group Worldwide =

American company and Ponzi scheme

Petters Group Worldwide was an American diversified company based in Minnetonka, Minnesota. Founded and led by CEO Tom Petters, the company operated a $3.65 billion Ponzi scheme. At its peak, Petters Group employed 3,200 people and held investments or ownership stakes in 60 companies, actively managing 20 of them, with offices across North America, South America, Asia, and Europe. Its holdings included Sun Country Airlines, Petters Warehouse Direct, and the remnants of Polaroid. The company reported $2.3 billion in revenue in 2007.

On September 24, 2008, the FBI raided the company's headquarters, the homes of several executives, and associated businesses. According to a federal affidavit, investigators used wiretaps and information from a cooperating witness to uncover an alleged $2 billion investment fraud scheme involving falsified purchase orders purportedly from Sam's Club and BJ's Wholesale Club to create the appearance of merchandise sales. Petters was identified as the central figure in the investigation. A federal court appointed attorney Doug Kelley as receiver for the Petters companies, excluding bankrupt Sun Country Airlines.

Petters Group Worldwide filed for Chapter 11 bankruptcy on October 13, 2008. Petters was convicted on December 2, 2009, on all counts related to the fraud scheme. On April 8, 2010, he was sentenced to 50 years in federal prison.

In November 2010, the Hennepin County Attorney's Office charged former Petters Group general counsel David Baer with drug possession after federal agents allegedly discovered illegal drugs in a safe beneath his office desk during the 2008 raid. Baer later received probation for three felony drug convictions and separate professional discipline from the Minnesota Supreme Court.
