= Swindled =

American true crime podcast

- Genre: True crime
- Country of origin: United States
- Language: English

Cast and voices
- Hosted by: "A Concerned Citizen"

Production
- Length: 40–80 minutes

Technical specifications
- Audio format: Podcast

Publication
- No. of seasons: 10
- No. of episodes: 139
- Original release: January 7, 2018
- Provider: Independent

Related
- Website: swindledpodcast.com

Swindled is an American true crime podcast written and hosted by an anonymous man who uses the pseudonym "A Concerned Citizen". The scripted series explores the world of white-collar crime, con artists, and corporate greed.

== Production ==
In a Q&A with BBC News, the anonymous host, a former government worker with a background in graphic design and audio production, claimed the inception of the podcast was motivated by the immorality of a "capitalistic culture". According to the Tampa Bay Times, "A Concerned Citizen" created Swindled after failing to find an existing podcast on similar topics. The host explained to MEL Magazine that the underlying theme in all of the episodes is greed and a "social culture that values getting rich as quick as possible."

Each episode begins with a prelude story to the main subject, followed by the theme music consisting of stringed and brass instruments, and then a structured narrative interspersed with archival audio, suspenseful scoring, and dry humor.

In addition to the writing, research, and audio production, "A Concerned Citizen" creates all of the visual artwork for the podcast. The show's music is written and performed by multi-instrumentalist Trevor Harte Howard using the moniker "Deformr".

Since its inception, Swindled has remained independent of podcasting networks. The podcast's advertising sales are supported by AdLarge Media based in New York, New York.

== Reception ==
The show has earned widespread critical acclaim. The Columbia Journalism Review called Swindled "the funniest, most expansive, and certainly the most sui generis podcast" to grace the true-crime genre. Vulture listed the series among the “52 Great True-Crime Podcasts of the post-Serial boom." The Star Tribune named it one of its "10 must-listen true crime podcasts" in June 2018.

The series has also been singled out internationally: The Guardian selected Swindled as its podcast "pick of the week" in September 2018 and WVXU highlighted the episode “The Saint” on its Start Hear program in November 2020. In January 2021, Canadian culture writer Scaachi Koul included Swindled in her recommended podcasts for CBC Radio.

Swindled has charted in the Top 100 podcasts in 5 countries, including Australia, Canada, Germany, United Kingdom, and United States.

In July 2018, true crime podcast Crime Junkie adopted Swindled's episode "The Contraceptive," covering the Dalkon Shield. In a profile of Crime Junkie host Ashley Flowers, Laura Barcella of Rolling Stone magazine wrote about the episode: "Flowers is at her best when dissecting complicated cases that stink of larger cover-ups and corruption."

A German translation of the series titled Schmutzige Geschäfte launched on November 19, 2018. A Danish translation titled Svindlerne subsequently followed in 2020.

=== Accolades ===
- Silver / Community Voice winner in the Sustainability, Environment, & Climate Awareness category at the 5th annual Anthem Awards
- Listed as #10 in "Top Subscriptions" on Apple Podcasts' Best of 2021
- Winner in the 2019 Discover Pods Awards for "Best True Crime Podcast"
- Runner-up in the 2019 Discover Pods Awards for "Best Overall Podcast"
- Runner-up in the 2018 Discover Pods Awards for "Best True Crime Podcast"
- Finalist in the 2018 Discover Pods Awards for "Best New Podcast"

== Episodes ==
=== Season 1 ===
Episode	Title	Subject	Prelude	Date
1	The Lucky Winner	Eddie Tipton	Triple Six Fix	January 7, 2018
2	The Horse Queen	Rita Crundwell	Trust, but verify	January 7, 2018
3	The Treasure Hunter	Tommy Thompson	Fenn treasure	January 7, 2018
4	The Canal	Love Canal	Denney Farm Chemical Spill	January 21, 2018
5	The Delivery Man	Brian Wells	Mosman bomb hoax	February 4, 2018
6	The Contraceptive	Dalkon Shield	Nelson Pill Hearings	February 18, 2018
7	The Treasurer	R. Budd Dwyer	Paul Powell	March 4, 2018
8	The Impostor	Jimmy Sabatino	William Douglas Street Jr.	March 18, 2018
9	The Leak	Bhopal Gas Disaster	1985 Institute, West Virginia Union Carbide Plant Leak	April 1, 2018
10	The Judges	Kids for Cash	Greg Skrepenak	April 15, 2018
11	The Hitman	Frank Howard	Jeffrey Locker	April 29, 2018
12	The Televangelist	Jim Bakker	Peter Popoff	May 13, 2018
13	The Pharma Bro	Martin Shkreli	Valeant Pharmaceuticals	May 28, 2018
14	The Association	FIFA	Colin Fowles	June 14, 2018
15	The Gigolo	Richard Bailey	Tommy "The Sandman" Burns	July 1, 2018

=== Season 2 ===
Episode	Title	Subject	Prelude	Date
1	The Canoe Man	John Darwin	David Friedland	September 9, 2018
2	The Lawsuit	McDonald's Hot Coffee	Bigbee v. Pacific Telephone and Telegraph	September 23, 2018
3	The Tycoon	Allen Stanford	Michael Marin	October 7, 2018
4	The Fyre Festival	Billy McFarland	Lapland New Forest	October 21, 2018
5	The Hostage	Tony Kiritsis	Clay Allen Duke	November 4, 2018
6	The Contestant	Charles Ingram	Michael Larson	November 18, 2018
7	The Psychic	Sylvia Browne	Miss Cleo	December 2, 2018
8	The Deputy	Frankie Bybee	Charles "Joe" Gliniewicz	December 16, 2018
9	The Mogul	Lou Pearlman	Alan Bond	January 6, 2019
10	The Formula	Nestlé Boycott of 1977	Chinese Baby Milk Scandal	January 20, 2019
11	The Body Snatcher	Michael Mastromarino	Tri-State Crematory	February 3, 2019
12	The Mayor	Kwame Kilpatrick	Murder of Tamara Greene	February 17, 2019
13	The Sting	Abscam	Mel Weinberg	March 2, 2019
14	The Downline	Herbalife	Glenn W. Turner	March 17, 2019
15	The Producer	Joe Francis	Bumfights	April 1, 2019

=== Season 3 ===
Episode	Title	Subject	Prelude	Date
1	The Socialite	Anna Delvey	Kari Ferrell	July 7, 2019
2	The Match	Simon Leviev	Maria Elvira Pinto Exposto	July 21, 2019
3	The Implants	Poly Implant Prothèse	Dow Corning	August 4, 2019
4	The Tour	Jered Threatin	Milli Vanilli	August 18, 2019
5	The Whistleblower	Karen Silkwood	Robert S. Kerr	August 31, 2019
6	The Fundraiser	Johnny Bobbit Jr.	Ginny Irovando Long	September 14, 2019
7	The Survivor	Tania Head	Fred Parisi	September 28, 2019
8	The Family Business	Doug Pielsticker	Falcon Transport	October 13, 2019
9	The Madam	Deborah Jeane Palfrey	Kristin M. Davis	October 27, 2019
10	The Mine	Crandall Canyon Mine	Sago Mine	November 10, 2019
11	The GPO Girl	Samantha Azzopardi	Guerdwich Montimere	November 24, 2019
12	The Revenger	Hunter Moore	Kevin Bollaert	December 8, 2019
13	The Sultan	Anthony Gignac	Coingate	December 22, 2019
14	The Raid	Agriprocessors	Swift & Co.	January 12, 2020
15	The Switch	Flint Water Crisis	Lead contamination in Washington, D.C. drinking water	January 26, 2020

=== Season 4 ===
Episode	Title	Subject	Prelude	Date
1	The Gamechanger	Belle Gibson	Jess Ainscough	May 10, 2020
2	The Pope	Dan Johnson	Dan Johnson	May 24, 2020
3	The Grant	Scott Westerhuis	Steven Sueppel	June 7, 2020
4	The Genius	Martin Frankel	Thomas Quinn	June 21, 2020
5	The Octopus	United Fruit Company/Chiquita	Dole Food Company	July 5, 2020
6	The Vigilante	Pat Johnson	Joe Stack	July 19, 2020
7	The Referee	Tim Donaghy	Joe Gagliano	August 3, 2020
8	The Treatment	Bayer AG	Ryan White	August 16, 2020
9	The Barefoot Bandit	Colton Harris Moore	Joshua Paul Calhoun	August 30, 2020
10	The I.M.O.M.	Peter Foster	John Chardon	September 12, 2020
11	The Space Program	Challenger Disaster	Vladimir Komarov	September 27, 2020
12	The Saint	Mother Teresa	Kevin Malarkey	October 11, 2020
13	The Pitchman	Don Lapre	Doug Grant	October 25, 2020
14	The Downfall	Marcus Schrenker	Raymond Roth	November 8, 2020
15	The Spill	Deepwater Horizon	Ixtoc I	November 22, 2020

=== Season 5 ===
Episode	Title	Subject	Prelude	Date
1	The Atheist	Madalyn Murray O'Hair	Engel v. Vitale	April 11, 2021
2	The Well	Walkerton E. coli outbreak	Washington County Fair	April 25, 2021
3	The Bishop	John P. Tomkins	Luke Helder	May 9, 2021
4	The Ivy Leaguer	Esther Reed	James Hogue	May 23, 2021
5	The Bakery	Sandy Jenkins	Alvin Kennard	June 6, 2021
6	The Brand	Procter & Gamble	Fenholloway River	June 20, 2021
7	The Patriarch	Anthony Todt	John Chairmonte	July 4, 2021
8	The Ghost Writer	Anthony Godby Johnson	New Horizons Youth Ministries	July 18, 2021
9	The Scheme	Bernie Madoff	Samuel Israel III	August 29, 2021
10	The Outbreak	Peanut Corporation of America	Jensen Farms	September 12, 2021
11	The Inferno	The Station nightclub fire	E2 nightclub stampede	September 28, 2021
12	The Killdozer	Marvin Heemeyer	Thomas Leask	October 12, 2021
13	The Salesman	William J. McCorkle	Charles J. Givens	October 25, 2021
14	The OB/GYN	Javaid Perwaiz	Roger Beyer	November 11, 2021
15	The Explosion	2020 Beirut explosion	West Fertilizer Company explosion	December 6, 2021

=== Season 6 ===
Episode	Title	Subject	Prelude	Date
1	The Vegan	Sarma Melngailis	PlantLab	March 16, 2022
2	The Pioneer	uBiome	Khalid Satary	April 3, 2022
3	The Verrückt	Schlitterbahn	Tyre Sampson	April 17, 2022
4	The Rockefeller	Christian Gerhartsreiter	Christophe Rocancourt	May 8, 2022
5	The Standoff	Ed & Elaine Brown	Montana Freemen	May 23, 2022
6	The Crusader	Nicholas Alahverdian	Michelle Rothgeb	June 5, 2022
7	The Perfect Trigger	Remington Arms	Henry Gordy Intl.	June 21, 2022
8	The Troubadour	Mark Leonard	Richmond, Indiana explosion	July 5, 2022
9	The Body Broker	Megan Hess	Arthur Rathburn	August 8, 2022
10	The Creamery	Blue Bell	Big Olaf	August 22, 2022
11	The Wagon	Richard Scrushy	Don Siegelman	September 19, 2022
12	The Label	Johnson & Johnson	DePuy	October 6, 2022
13	The Liability	Johnson & Johnson	Ethicon	October 23, 2022
14	The Crocodile	Heather Morgan & Ilya Lichtenstein	Alphabay	November 10, 2022
15	The Relief	Hurricane Katrina	Hurricane Betsy	December 7, 2022

=== Season 7 ===
Episode	Title	Subject	Prelude	Date
1	The Balloon Boy	Richard Heene	Lawn Chair Larry	March 16, 2023
2	The Phantom	Imperial Food Products	Triangle Waist Company	April 2, 2023
3	The Teenager	Malachi Love-Robinson	Matthew Scheidt	April 17, 2023
4	The Messenger	Kevin Trudeau	Hooked on Phonics	May 1, 2023
5	The Captive	SeaWorld	Free Willy-Keiko	May 22, 2023
6	The Islanders	John Spano	William "Boots" Del Biaggio III	June 7, 2023
7	The Jeweler	Nicolas Shaughnessy	Erik Charles Maund	June 25, 2023
8	The Lottery Lawyer	Jason Kurland	Billie Bob Harrell Jr.	July 11, 2023
9	The Skywalks	Hyatt Regency Disaster	FIU Bridge Collapse	August 2, 2023
10	The Side Door	Operation Varsity Blues	Wintercap SA	August 31, 2023
11	The Missing	Melissa Caddick	Brad Sherwin	September 22, 2023
12	The Other Woman	Vicki Morgan	Bernie Cornfeld	October 17, 2023
13	The Nose Doctor	Mark Weinberger	Philip Gabriele	November 4, 2023
14	The Kepone Shakes	Life Science Products	Chlordecone	November 26, 2023
15	The Monopoly	Pacific Gas & Electric	San Bruno pipeline explosion	December 25, 2023

=== Season 8 ===
Episode	Title	Subject	Prelude	Date
1	The Tornado	Kim Neiman	The Pilger Twins	March 17, 2024
2	The Technology	Real Water	Elizabeth Helgelien	March 31, 2024
3	The Commander	Bobby C. Thompson	Kevin White	April 14, 2024
4	The Machine	Tyson Foods	Cody Easterday	April 30, 2024
5	The Mess	Eric C. Conn	Puerto Rico disability fraud ring	May 14, 2024
6	The Embattled	Jasiel Correia	Dianne Wilkerson	May 30, 2024
7	The Sugarpit	Indiana State Fair Stage Collapse	Ottawa Bluesfest stage collapse	June 14, 2024
8	The Satan Seller	Mike Warnke	John Todd	July 1, 2024
9	The Fungus	New England Compounding Center meningitis outbreak	Pharmakon Pharmaceuticals	August 5, 2024
10	The Bling Bishop	Lamor Whitehead	The Q Train Shooting	August 21, 2024
11	The Juggalos	ICP V. FBI	Murder of Michael Goucher	September 5, 2024
12	The Airliner	ValuJet	Allegiant Air	September 25, 2024
13	The Prince	Joel Morehu-Barlow	IBM Australia	October 10, 2024
14	The Magic Pill	Fen-Phen	Belviq	October 31, 2024
15	The Descent	Titan submersible implosion	Steve Fossett	November 25, 2024

=== Season 9 ===
Episode	Title	Subject	Prelude	Date
1	The Derailment	East Palestine, OH	Paulsboro, NJ	March 2, 2025
2	The Warlord	Invisible Children	Joseph Kony	March 20, 2025
3	The Acquisition	Charlie Javice	Joanna Smith-Griffin	April 6, 2025
4	The Pinto	Ford Motor Company	Toyota Corona	April 20, 2025
5	The Reporter	Jeff German	Ted Binion	May 7, 2025
6	The Baby Heaven	Camp Lejeune	Woburn, MA	May 26, 2025
7	The White Knight	eBay	YouTube headquarters shooting	June 11, 2025
8	The Charade	Scott W. Rothstein	Melissa Britt Lewis	July 8, 2025
9	The Death Trap	Ride the Ducks	Miss Majestic	July 27, 2025
10	The Wunderkind	Ephren Taylor II	Lucian Development	August 14, 2025
11	The Utopia	Galt's Gulch Chile	Principality of New Utopia	September 7, 2025
12	The Mix Up	The PBB Disaster	Phosvel Zombies	September 28, 2025
13	The Fabulist	George Santos	JP Maroney	November 10, 2025
14	The Motherlode	Bre-X Minerals	John Bjornstrom	November 24, 2025
15	The Panama Papers	Panama Papers	Daphne Caruana Galizia	December 24, 2025

=== Season 10 ===
Title	Episode	Subject	Prelude	Date
The Blueprint	1	Chris and Jeff George	Purdue Pharma	January 30, 2026
The Apostle	2	David E. Taylor	Kathryn Kuhlman	February 27, 2026
The Lampoon	3	Tim Durham	Dan Laikin	March 28, 2026
The Abandoned	4	Paria diving tragedy	1985 Trintoc explosion	April 30, 2026
The Ghost Town	5	Times Beach, Missouri	Shenandoah Stables	June 1, 2026
The Mirage	6	Nikola Motor Company	Lordstown Motors	July 6, 2026
The Façade	7	Rob Kissel	Andrew Kissel	August 10, 2026
The New Formula	8	Abbott Laboratories	ByHeart	September 10, 2026
The Chamber	9	Oxford Recovery Center	Ocean Hyperbaric Neurological Center	October 10, 2026
The Darkness	10	Jaycee Wasso	Mazal Group	November 9, 2026

=== Bonus Episodes ===
Episode	Title	Subject	Date
1	The Promotion	McDonalds Monopoly	December 27, 2017
2	The Reef	Osborne Reef	December 27, 2017
3	The Fire	Marc Thompson	January 28, 2018
4	The Mortician	Jean Crump	March 6, 2018
5	The Homemaker	Martha Stewart	April 25, 2018
6	The Pole Saw	David Player and Gerald "Trey" Hardin	June 4, 2018
7	The Refugee	Wyclef Jean	July 22, 2018
8	The Tree Farm	Rachel Lee	December 8, 2018
9	The Convention	DashCon	January 27, 2019
10	The Boner King	Enzyte	March 6, 2019
11	The Vendor	Vendstar	May 1, 2019
12	The Portofino Pirate	Larissa Watson	May 14, 2019
13	The Chess Champion	Paul Charles Dozsa	June 24, 2019
14	The Conductor	Kyle Sandler	August 19, 2019
15	The Bookkeeper	Kim Williams	October 6, 2019
16	The Puppeteer	Natalia Burgess	November 14, 2019
17	The Promotion [Redux]	McDonalds Monopoly	January 5, 2020
18	The Neighbor	Carla Jones	March 3, 2020
19	VN4VL: Democracy Manifest	Updates for previous episodes	March 10, 2020
20	The Developer	Shannon Egeland	March 17, 2020
21	The Boner King [Redux]	Enzyte	April 1, 2020
22	VN4VL: Coronamania	Updates for previous episodes	June 1, 2020
23	The Sweepstakes	Pepsi Number Fever	August 18, 2020
24	The Birthday Party	Gary Milby	December 4, 2020
25	The Chili	Anna Ayala	December 23, 2020
26	VN4VL: Hunting for Love & Treasure	Updates for previous episodes	December 31, 2020
27	The Pigeon King	Arlan Galbraith	February 13, 2021
28	The Chemical	Film Recovery Systems	March 5, 2021
29	The Hero	Candace Clark	March 7, 2021
30	VN4VL: Kwame's Resurrection	Updates for previous episodes	June 26, 2021
31	The Beach House Sheriff	Todd Entrekin	August 1, 2021
32	The Pink Slime	Beef Products, Inc.	August 3, 2021
33	The Test	Brandy Murrah	November 3, 2021
34	The Healer	Michael Guglielmucci	December 16, 2021
35	The Money Doctor	W. Neil Gallagher	January 12, 2022
36	VN4VL: Synergy	Updates for previous episodes	February 18, 2022
37	The Canal [Redux]	Love Canal	May 1, 2022
38	VN4VL: Me Hate Greed	Updates for previous episodes	May 12, 2022
39	The Funky Munky	Tim Vasquez	May 27, 2022
40	The Mark	Elisah Spencer	July 14, 2022
41	The Imaginary Target	Denis Molla	July 15, 2022
42	The Coroner	Shannon Kent	August 11, 2022
43	VN4VL: Game is Afoot	Updates for previous episodes	September 2, 2022
44	The American Sniper	Chris Kyle	November 22, 2022
45	The Anglers	Jake Runyan & Chase Cominsky	December 22, 2022
46	The Studio	Carissa Carpenter	January 10, 2023
47	VN4VL: There is No Cure	Updates for previous episodes	February 8, 2023
48	The Beneficiary	David Del Rio	March 23, 2023
49	The Vacation Rental	Carrie Jade Williams	April 19, 2023
50	The Momfluencer	Katie Sorensen	May 8, 2023
51	The Veyron	Andy House	June 15, 2023
52	The Oven	Bumble Bee Foods	June 30, 2023
53	The Scratch-Off	Urooj Khan	July 19, 2023
54	VN4VL: Death Keeps a Secret	Updates for previous episodes	August 16, 2023
55	The Predator	Nate Holzapfel	October 3, 2023
56	The Million Pity	Monkey torture ring	January 10, 2024
57	The Free Flight Fiasco	The Hoover Company	January 17, 2024
58	VN4VL: Grounded	Updates for previous episodes	February 23, 2024
59	The Godfather	William Mize	February 27, 2024
60	The Actor	Zach Horwitz	March 21, 2024
61	The Targeting Target	Mark Charles Barnett	April 5, 2024
62	The Delinquent	Zachry Bailey	June 2, 2024
63	The Tic Tac Man	Bob McDonnell	July 9, 2024
64	The Deadbeat	J. Nicholas Bryant	July 25, 2024
65	The Fund	Darren Berg	July 9, 2024
66	The Tiger	Tobias Reitsman	October 14, 2024
67	The Homeless Hero	Chris Parker	November 11, 2024
68	VN4VL: Condemn. Convict. Commute.	Updates for previous episodes	January 6, 2025
69	The Odyssey	Gary Shawkey	January 26, 2025
70	The Foundation	New Era Philanthropy	February 11, 2025
71	The Interpreter	Ippei Mizuhara	March 28, 2025
72	The Priapism	NuMale Medical Center	May 12, 2025
