= Easterday =

Easterday may refer to:

- Easterday, Kentucky, an unincorporated community in Carroll County
- C. M. Easterday (1855–1918), American politician in the Washington State Senate
- Cody Easterday, American rancher and fraudster
- Henry Easterday (1864–1895), professional baseball player
- Katy Easterday (Roy Alexander Easterday, 1894–1976), American football and basketball player, athlete, coach, college athletics administrator, and dentist
- Kenny Easterday (1973–2016), American man born with the rare disability, sacral agenesis

== See also ==
- Easter
