= Rita Crundwell =

American politician and convicted embezzler (born 1953)

- Born: January 10, 1953 (age 73); Dixon, Illinois, U.S.
- Status: Sentence commuted Early release August 19, 2021; Formerly imprisoned at Federal Correctional Institution, Pekin; Projected release date was October 20, 2029
- Conviction: November 14, 2012 (pleaded guilty)
- Criminal charge: Wire fraud (embezzlement)
- Penalty: 19 years 7 months imprisonment Forfeiture of $53.7 million

Rita A. Crundwell (née Humphrey; born January 10, 1953) is an American woman who served as the comptroller and treasurer of Dixon, Illinois, from 1983 to 2012. She was fired and arrested in April 2012 after the discovery that she had embezzled $53.7 million from the city of Dixon for over 22 years to support her championship American Quarter Horse breeding operation, as well as a lavish lifestyle away from work. Her embezzlement has been described as the largest municipal fraud in U.S. history. Crundwell pleaded guilty to her crimes and was sentenced to 19 years and 7 months in prison.

Crundwell used the money to turn her Quarter Horse breeding operation, RC Quarter Horses, into one of the best-known in the country. Her horses won 52 world championships and she was named the leading owner by the American Quarter Horse Association for eight consecutive years prior to her arrest. She spent 8 1/2 years (43% of her sentence) in prison before being released in mid-2021 to serve the remainder of her sentence in home confinement. Her sentence was commuted along with nearly 1500 other people by President Biden on December 12, 2024. Those commuted were people who had been previously transferred from prison to house arrest under the CARES Act due to having a high risk of COVID-19.

== Early life and career ==
Born Rita Humphrey, the daughter of Ray and Caroline Humphrey, Crundwell grew up on her family's farm near Dixon, and was a student at Dixon High School. In 1970, a year before graduating, the teenager began working at the Dixon City Hall as a work-study student. She began showing American Quarter Horses in 1978.

She married engineering technician Jerry L. Crundwell in 1974, while working as a secretary for Dixon's mayor, but divorced Crundwell in 1986.

In 1983, Crundwell was appointed the treasurer and comptroller for Dixon, working in this capacity for almost three decades. Crundwell acquired a sterling reputation; in 2011, one of the city commissioners praised her stewardship of city finances, saying that "she looks after every tax dollar as if it were her own."

== Embezzlement ==
In 1990, Crundwell opened a bank account named the Reserve Sewer Capital Development Account (RSCDA), making it appear to be a city account. She was the only signatory. Crundwell would have money deposited into another account called the Capital Development Fund, create false state invoices, and then write checks from the fund payable to "Treasurer", which she would deposit into the RSCDA account. According to federal investigators, this relatively uncomplicated scheme continued for 22 years.

On average, Crundwell stole nearly $2.5 million per year from the city, starting from a low of $181,000 in 1991, growing to the embezzlement of $5.8 million in 2008 – from a city with an annual budget of $8–9 million. Crundwell used the money not only to finance her Quarter Horse operation, but also to support a lifestyle well beyond her $80,000 city salary, purchasing several cars, a second house and a $2.1 million 45-foot luxury motorhome.

Crundwell covered up her embezzlement by claiming that the city's frequent budget shortfalls were due to the state being late in paying its share of tax revenue. She forced city departments to make drastic service cuts to keep the budget within reason. As a result, employees went two years or more without raises and the police department could not afford new radios. The most visible effect, however, was on street maintenance; the city was forced to lay off three of its nine street repair workers and cut the rate of maintenance. In the decade before Crundwell's arrest, only 65 blocks of road were repaired or replaced.

For most of Crundwell's tenure, residents assumed either that she inherited her wealth and/or that her horse breeding business was profitable in its own right. However, by the onset of the Great Recession, some grew suspicious that Crundwell was stealing money. But the city's outside auditors, Clifton Gunderson (now CliftonLarsonAllen after merging with LarsonAllen in 2012) and local accountant Samuel Card presumed that Crundwell was honest and signed off on her annual financial statements without concern. For small U.S. cities similar to Dixon, lack of sufficient outside audits was a recurring problem, as third-party auditors could give at best limited attention. For most of her tenure as comptroller, Crundwell had nearly complete control over the city's accounts, while few city employees had access to the city's financial statements.

== Capture and arrest ==
In the fall of 2011, while Crundwell was on an extended vacation, city clerk and acting comptroller Kathe Swanson discovered the RSCDA account with 179 deposits and associated checking activity. Swanson did not recognize the account as a legitimate city account, and alerted Dixon mayor James Burke. In turn, Burke contacted the Federal Bureau of Investigation (FBI). For the next six months, Burke and Swanson (whose payroll was controlled by Crundwell) remained silent while the FBI built their case.

Crundwell arrived for work on April 17, 2012, to find FBI agents waiting for her. She was arrested later that day and was indicted by a federal grand jury for embezzling $53 million in city money over the previous six years. Crundwell was charged with one count of wire fraud and released on $4,500 bail the next day. On May 2, 2012, a superseding indictment charged Crundwell with embezzling $53 million over the prior 22 years.

On November 14, 2012, Crundwell pleaded guilty before Judge Philip Reinhard to a single count of wire fraud. As part of the deal, she also admitted to money laundering by using the embezzled money to finance her horse operation. Crundwell was required to forfeit more than $53.7 million in cash, assets and possessions, equivalent to the amount she stole, which is being used to make full restitution to the city. She reportedly told FBI agents that some of the money was spent on her horses and their upkeep. Prosecutors sought the forfeiture of her horse farm and 300 horses, in addition to her three homes and a luxury motorhome vehicle. Prosecutors later discovered that Crundwell's crimes had begun as early as 1988, when she siphoned off $25,000 from the Dixon Sister City program over two years. Had she not pleaded guilty, she would have faced additional charges of bank fraud, wire fraud, and money laundering that could have sent her to prison for the rest of her life.

The following month, Dixon's new finance director said that the city had seen an almost $3 million rebound since Crundwell's arrest, but that the operating budget was still off by $16.6 million. It was also reported that Dixon lost $30 million in operating funds over the prior decade. The city sued its outside auditors, as well as the city's banker, Fifth Third Bank, for ignoring numerous red flags in Crundwell's actions. In September 2013, the auditors and Fifth Third agreed to pay the city $40 million in a legal settlement, while the auction of Crundwell's assets brought in over $9 million. Richard Humphrey Jr., Crundwell's nephew, purchased the 88-acre (36 ha) horse ranch formerly owned by Crundwell, for $1 million in an auction a few days before she was sentenced. Her brother, Richard, purchased one of the houses she owned in Dixon. The property includes 40 acres (16 ha) of farmland that borders another 40 acres of farmland he owns.

At sentencing on February 14, 2013, prosecutors sought the maximum sentence of 20 years in federal prison. Their case was bolstered by testimony from Burke and city staffers that Crundwell used dramatic analogies to force spending cuts to cover up her theft, which left Dixon unable to provide the most basic services. The defense asked for 13 years, saying that Crundwell had cooperated with authorities in recovering the money. Ultimately, Reinhard sentenced Crundwell to 19 years and 7 months in prison, close to what prosecutors had sought. Reinhard noted that she put her passion for raising horses ahead of the needs of the city residents who had entrusted her with their funds, and that a significant prison term was required to restore public confidence. Reinhard was so disgusted with Crundwell's behavior that he revoked her bail and remanded her to custody rather than allow her to self-report to prison. Crundwell appealed the sentence, but the Seventh Circuit Court of Appeals upheld it in November 2013.

Crundwell's embezzlement has been the subject of academic and professional publications.

On September 20, 2012, Crundwell was also indicted on 60 state counts of theft, alleging that she stole $11.2 million from April 2010 until the day of her arrest. Burke and Lee County State's Attorney Henry Dixon said the state charges, which carried a minimum of 6 years per count, were a backup in case Crundwell was acquitted on the federal charges. The state charges were dropped in April 2013. Dixon's successor as state's attorney, Anna Sacco-Miller, said that it did not make sense to spend taxpayer money on prosecuting Crundwell, as there were virtually no assets left for the state to seize (though Dixon had initially said he had no plans to seize assets from her). Sacco-Miller also said that because Illinois sentencing guidelines require state and federal sentences to run concurrently, Crundwell would likely serve out any sentence imposed at the state level while she was still in federal prison.

== Prison and release ==
Crundwell was incarcerated at minimum-security Federal Correctional Institution, Waseca in Waseca, Minnesota. She was originally eligible and scheduled for release after serving 85% of her sentence (16 years 8 months) on March 5, 2030. Under the First Step Act she was receiving good conduct time deductions of 54 days per year off her sentence.

On April 27, 2020, Crundwell submitted a request for a compassionate release with the warden of the Federal Prison Camp in Waseca. On that same date she filed a motion with the Illinois Northern District Court in Rockford, Illinois. Her motion requested home confinement under the First Step Act. The motion also sought a transfer to home confinement based on a Response to the COVID-19 pandemic memo dated March 26, 2020, from Attorney General William Barr to the Federal Bureau of Prisons. Crundwell cited, amongst other things, her "health issues, including high blood pressure and high cholesterol" and her good conduct while incarcerated. The motion was withdrawn by Crundwell on May 18, 2020, a few days after Dixon City Council strongly opposed an early release. The motion withdrawing the home confinement request was granted on May 21, 2020.

A little over a year later, on August 4, 2021, after serving half of the required 45% of her sentence (about 8 1/2 years), she was released by the Federal Bureau of Prisons (i.e. not by a court) on compassionate grounds to a residential reentry center - a halfway house or a home confinement, possibly her brother, Richard Humphrey's ranch (farm) in Dixon as she proposed in her previously withdrawn request for release. Two months later in October 2021, she was reported to live at the brother's 80-acre farm. Because she is serving her sentence in home confinement, she's not allowed to leave the farm property without permission. She was overseen by a residential reentry management field office in Chicago suburb Downers Grove.

On December 12, 2024, Crundwell's sentence was commuted by President Joe Biden along with nearly 1500 other individuals who were previously released under the CARES Act, which allowed people with a high risk of COVID-19 to be released from prison into home detention.

Crundwell's story was featured on the January 15, 2025, edition of Freeform's Scam Goddess, hosted by Laci Mosley.

== In popular culture ==
- CNBC's American Greed (episode 83, The Cunning Cowgirl Crook)
- CBC's The Fifth Estate: "Rita Crundwell - Fraud in Dixon Illinois : Small Town Shakedown" on YouTube
- All the Queen's Horses, a 2017 documentary directed by forensic accountant Kelly Richmond Pope and distributed by Kartemquin Films, focused on Crundwell
- Illinois Channel: Embezzling $53 MILLION: How Rita Crundwell Operated the Largest Municipal Fraud in American History on YouTube
- The Talented Miss Farwell by Emily Gray Tedrowe, published September 2020, is a novel inspired by the Crundwell case
- Swindled podcast, Season 1, Episode 2, The Horse Queen
- Scam Goddess podcast, September 11, 2023 episode The Govt. Horse Hustler w/ Adam Conover
