= Bill Mizeur =

American baseball player (1897-1976)

- Pinch hitter
- Born: June 22, 1897; Nokomis, Illinois, U.S.
- Died: August 27, 1976 (aged 79); Decatur, Illinois, U.S.
- Batted: Left Threw: Right

MLB debut
- September 30, 1923, for the St. Louis Browns

Last MLB appearance
- September 13, 1924, for the St. Louis Browns

MLB statistics
- Games played: 2
- At bats: 2
- Hits: 0
- Stats at Baseball Reference

Teams
- St. Louis Browns (1923–1924)

William Francis "Bad Bill" Mizeur (June 22, 1897 – August 27, 1976) was an American pinch hitter in Major League Baseball. He played in two games for the St. Louis Browns and also had a 14-year minor league career.

== Career ==
Mizeur was born in Nokomis, Illinois. He started his professional baseball career in 1922, at the age of 25, and hit .333 in Class D. The following season, he broke out, batting .328 and leading the Class B Michigan–Ontario League with 174 hits. He made his major league debut on September 30, with the Browns, and went 0 for 1 at the plate.

Mizeur continued his good hitting in 1924. He spent the year with the Terre Haute Tots of the Illinois–Indiana–Iowa League, batting .327, and hitting 11 home runs. On September 13, he appeared in one more game for the Browns, again as a pinch hitter. That was the last major league experience of his career.

Mizeur spent most of the next seven years in the IIIL. He stayed with Terre Haute in 1925 and 1926, batting over .320 in both campaigns, and then went to the Peoria Tractors. He put up his best numbers in 1927, setting career-highs in six offensive categories: batting average (.354), slugging percentage (.618), total bases (325), hits (186), triples (19), and home runs (23). He eventually finished behind teammate Red Smith for the batting title, but Mizeur did lead the league in total bases, hits, triples, and homers.

From 1928 to 1931, he played for the Springfield Senators and continued his torrid hitting. Mizeur consistently finished among the league leaders in various statistics throughout his career. In 1932, he moved to the Mississippi Valley League's Cedar Rapids Bunnies for one season. He hit .360 and won the batting title. Mizeur then went to Peoria in 1933 and then back to Cedar Rapids in 1934. In August 1934, he took over as manager for the Western League's Cedar Rapids Raiders for the last part of the season. In 1935, he played for both Cedar Rapids and Rock Island and batted .236. At the age of 38, it was the first time that Mizeur had posted a below-.300 average over the course of a season.

Mizeur retired after 1935. He died at the age of 79 in Decatur, Illinois, and was buried in Calvary Cemetery.
