= Email Privacy Act =

US bill to update online communications law

The Email Privacy Act is a proposed law in the United States Congress. The bipartisan, proposed federal law was originally introduced and sponsored in the House of Representatives by Kevin Yoder, a Republican from Kansas, and Jared Polis, a Democrat of Colorado. The law is designed to update and reform existing online communications law, specifically the Electronic Communications Privacy Act (ECPA) of 1986.

Passed by the House three separate times, the legislation has been ignored or blocked by the Senate. In the 113th Congress (2013–15), the bill never made it out of subcommittee. In the 114th Congress (2015–17), however, the bill was unanimously passed by the House, but was derailed in the Senate following a series of amendments introduced by Republican Senator John Cornyn of Texas, the Senate Majority Whip. In both the 115th (2017) and 116th Congresses (2019), the legislation passed the House, but failed to receive a vote in the Senate.

== Background and bill provisions ==
The legislation would require authorities such as the Department of Justice and Securities and Exchange Commission to obtain a search warrant to access emails, data in cloud storage, and other digital communications more than 180 days old.

Under current law, the Electronic Communications Privacy Act (ECPA) of 1986, authorities can obtain such data by issuing an administrative subpoena to an Internet service provider, without the need to obtain judicial approval. The Congressional Research Service reported in 2015 that: "In recent years, ECPA has faced increased criticism from both the tech and privacy communities that it has outlived its usefulness in the digital era and does not provide adequate privacy safeguards for individuals' electronic communications. In light of these concerns, various reform bills have been introduced in the past several Congresses."

The Email Privacy Act would codify as federal law the decision of the Court of Appeals for the Sixth Circuit in United States v. Warshak (2010). In that case, the court held that the Fourth Amendment requires that the government obtain a warrant before accessing emails stored online (e.g., in the cloud). The Warshak ruling currently applies only to the Sixth Circuit; the Email Privacy Act would extend its rule nationwide.

=== Support and opposition ===
The Electronic Frontier Foundation expressed support for the legislation, characterizing the 2016 House vote as a victory for user privacy and urging the Senate to pass the bill without amendment. The organization nonetheless identified the absence of a government notification requirement (whereby users would be informed when authorities sought their data from service providers) as a significant deficiency, arguing that such notification is necessary to enable users to seek legal counsel.

In April 2016, a broad coalition of civil society organizations, corporations, and trade associations issued an open letter in support of the Email Privacy Act. Signatories included Adobe, ACT/The App Association (formerly the Association for Competitive Technology), Amazon.com, Inc., the American Civil Liberties Union (ACLU), the American Library Association, Americans for Tax Reform (ATR), the Brennan Center for Justice, the Center for Democracy and Technology (CDT), Cisco Systems, the Consumer Technology Association, the Direct Marketing Association, Dropbox, the EFF, Facebook, FreedomWorks, Google, HP, the Internet Association, LinkedIn, Microsoft, the Newspaper Association of America, the Niskanen Center, Symantec, Twitter, the U.S. Chamber of Commerce, and Yahoo. The letter characterized the legislation as a necessary modernization of federal law to align statutory protections with users' reasonable expectations of privacy regarding electronic communications and cloud-stored data..

The Digital 4th Coalition, an ideologically diverse advocacy coalition comprising the ACLU, ATR, CDT, and Heritage Action, also supported the legislation, establishing a public-facing website to promote the bill and encourage constituent outreach to elected officials.

A poll commissioned by the Digital 4th Coalition and conducted by Vox found that 77 percent of registered voters supported a warrant requirement for government access to emails, photographs, and other private online communications. Among respondents who were presented with a description of the ECPA's existing provisions, 86 percent favored updating the law, and 53 percent indicated greater likelihood of supporting a candidate who backed online privacy reform.

In 2015, the Obama administration expressed general support for ECPA reform in response to a We the People petition that exceeded 100,000 signatures, though the White House did not endorse any specific legislative proposal.

Opposition to the bill came primarily from certain federal agencies that relied on administrative subpoenas to obtain electronic records in the course of investigations. In September 2015 Senate committee testimony, Federal Trade Commission officials raised concerns that the proposed reforms could constrain the agency's access to information held by Internet companies.

== 113th Congress (2013–15) ==
The bill failed in the 113th Congress. The bill was introduced in May 2013 by Yoder and 272 cosponsors as H.R. 1852. However, it never made it out of the United States House Judiciary Subcommittee on Crime, Terrorism, Homeland Security and Investigations.

== 114th Congress (2015–17) ==
In the 114th Congress, the bill was introduced again, in February 2015, as H.R. 699. The bill garnered the most cosponsors of any bill in this Congress, with 194 Republicans and 115 Democrats cosponsoring. The 14-page bill unanimously passed the House Judiciary Committee and then, on April 27, 2016, unanimously passed the House (419-0). The passage of the bill in the House was hailed by the New York Times editorial board, which called the bill a "sensible" if imperfect update to privacy law and said that the House vote was a "rare and remarkable display of bipartisanship." The lead sponsors of the companion Senate legislation, the Electronic Communications Privacy Act Amendments Act of 2015 (S. 356) were Senator Patrick Leahy, Democrat of Vermont, and Senator Mike Lee, Republican of Utah. Twenty-five other senators were cosponsors.

After the House passed its bill, Leahy and Lee called upon the Senate to "take up and pass this bipartisan, common-sense legislation without delay." However, the bill languished in the Senate Judiciary Committee, and the committee's chairman, Senator Chuck Grassley, Republican of Iowa, expressed concern "about the details of this reform, and whether it is balanced to reflect issues raised by law enforcement." Senate Majority Whip John Cornyn, Republican of Texas, offered two amendments in the Judiciary Committee that weakened the legislation: one to give federal authorities the power to access electronic identifying information without a warrant in counterterrorism cases, and the other to give the director of the Federal Bureau of Investigation or someone acting in his or her capacity "the power to compel a provider to hand over the name, physical address, email, telephone number or other identifying information" if relevant to "an authorized counterterrorism operation." The Cornyn amendments angered civil liberties and tech-advocacy groups who supported the bill, including Computer & Communications Industry Association, ACLU, and Open Technology Institute, who urged the Senate to pass the House bill. Six other senators have also offered amendments in the Senate Judiciary Committee, including an amendment by Republican Senator Jeff Sessions of Alabama, which would have exempted federal agents from the requirement to secure a warrant if the government asserts that an emergency situation exists. The Sessions amendment was opposed by advocates for privacy rights, "because it does not require any judicial backstop to review the action afterward to see if the surveillance was warranted and should continue." After the Cornyn and Sessions amendments were offered, the bill's lead Senate sponsors, Leahy and Lee, withdrew the bill from consideration, saying that they feared that the amendments would make "Americans' electronic communication even less private than it is now."

== 115th Congress (2017–19) ==
The Email Privacy Act was again introduced in the 115th Congress, with Polis and Yoder again being the lead sponsors of the bill. It passed the House of Representatives (where it had 109 sponsors) on a voice vote on February 6, 2017, but was again expected to encounter Republican opposition in the Senate, and never made it out of Senate committee.

== 116th Congress (2019–21) ==
In the 116th Congress, the Email Privacy Act was included as an amendment to the version of the National Defense Authorization Act for Fiscal Year 2019 (NDAA FY 2019) legislation passed by the House of Representatives; the amendment passed on 351–66 vote. However, the provision failed in the Senate, and so the NDAA FY 2019 "passed without EPA's reforms or the broader ECPA Modernization Act of 2017" proposed by Senator Patrick Leahy (D-VT) or Senator Mike Lee (R-UT).

== See also ==
- Fourth Amendment to the United States Constitution
- Reasonable expectation of privacy
- Search and seizure
- Mass surveillance in the United States
- United States v. Warshak
- Electronic Communications Privacy Act
