= EBay stalking scandal =

Scandal involving eBay's leadership

eBay stalking scandal
- Duration: Launched in January 2019
- Motive: Deter website authors who wrote negative material about eBay
- Target: Ina and David Steiner of EcommerceBytes
- Convicted: 7 eBay employees

The eBay stalking scandal was a campaign conducted in 2019 by eBay and contractors working for the company. The scandal involved the aggressive stalking and harassment of two e-commerce bloggers, Ina and David Steiner, who wrote frequent commentary about eBay on their website EcommerceBytes. Seven eBay employees pleaded guilty to charges involving criminal conspiracies, including two senior members of eBay’s corporate security team. Two members of eBay's Executive Leadership Team who were implicated in the scandal were not charged.

A feature documentary film titled Whatever It Takes: Inside the eBay Scandal, directed by Jenny Carchman, was released in 2024.

== Background ==
=== EcommerceBytes ===
EcommerceBytes is an online newsletter and e-commerce trade publication founded in 1999, four years after eBay was founded. Initially called AuctionBytes, the website offered advice to buyers in the early days of internet commerce. In the years after its founding, the website became a resource for sellers on a number of platforms, from Etsy to Amazon, a kind of trade publication for anyone whose business is selling items online. It is read primarily by sellers, but also by some corporate staff, including some who posted comments on their website. The website not only offers advice, but also critiques corporate and policy changes at eBay and other e-commerce platforms. For example, in April 2019, Ina Steiner reported on the website that eBay's then-CEO Devin Wenig was paid 152 times more than the typical eBay employee.

=== Investor requests changes ===
In January 2019, Elliott Management, a hedge fund, purchased a significant investment in eBay. They sent a letter to its board of directors requesting changes, such as replacing the CEO, saying that eBay "as a public-company investment has underperformed both its peers and the market for a prolonged period of time." This was interpreted as placing additional demands on eBay management to produce results, leading to an atmosphere of heightened stress throughout the company.

== Stalking and harassment ==
Members of eBay's executive leadership had long been bothered by the couple's posts. Under pressure in early 2019 to enhance performance, the company felt a new sense of urgency. For example, in April 2019, eBay’s chief communications officer at the time, Steve Wymer, sent Wenig a post about how outsized Wenig's compensation was compared to typical employees, adding, "we are going to crush this lady." One month later Wenig texted Wymer, "Take her down." Wymer allegedly took the concerns to the head of eBay's security division, Jim Baugh, whose team began harassing the Steiners at home and online. Wymer texted Baugh that Ina Steiner was a "biased troll who needs to be BURNED DOWN"; that he wanted "to see ashes"; and that Baugh should do "whatever it takes."

The Steiners were harassed and threatened both online and physically in their home. eBay employees used fake social media accounts to send them harassing and threatening messages. They posted the Steiners' personal data online, including their home address, and invited strangers to come to their house by posting fake announcements for yard sales and parties. eBay employees also arranged deliveries of anonymously posted packages to the Steiners' home, which included live cockroaches and spiders, a bloody pig mask, as well as a book entitled "Grief Diaries: Surviving Loss of a Spouse" which was followed by the delivery of a funeral wreath. Pornographic magazines with David Steiner’s name on them were sent to a neighbor’s house. When the bloody pig mask was delivered to the Steiners' house, Ina Steiner received a direct message from a fake Twitter account set up by eBay employees, saying: “DO I HAVE UR ATTENTION NOW????”

Employees flew from California to Boston so they could vandalize the couple's home in Natick, Massachusetts, as well as stalk their personal vehicle. Plans were even made to break into the couple's garage and place a GPS tracker on their car.

The stalking and harassment campaign was designed to silence the Steiners' reporting on eBay and to protect the eBay brand. In addition to the harassment and intimidation, eBay employees devised a "White Knight Strategy" to win their good will, which saw a senior member of eBay's Global Security Team, Brian Gilbert, reach out to the Steiners in his official capacity to offer them help with the very harassment that he and his colleagues were committing against them.

== Criminal charges ==
"This was a determined, systematic effort by senior employees of a major company to destroy the lives of a couple in Natick all because they published content that company executives didn’t like. For a while they succeeded, psychologically devastating these victims for weeks as they desperately tried to figure out what was going on and stop it."

— Massachusetts US attorney Andrew Lelling

In June 2020, the U.S. Department of Justice charged six former eBay employees and contractors with conspiracy to commit cyberstalking and conspiracy to tamper with witnesses; a seventh former employee was charged in July. In January 2024, eBay itself was charged with six felony offenses, including stalking, witness tampering, and obstruction of justice.

- James Baugh, eBay's Senior Director of Safety & Security, pleaded guilty in April 2022 and was sentenced to 2 years and 9 months in prison.
- David Harville, eBay's former Director of Global Resiliency, pleaded guilty to his participation in the harassment in May 2022 and was sentenced to 2 years in prison.
- Stephanie Popp, eBay's Senior Manager of Global Intelligence, pleaded guilty in October 2020 and was sentenced to 1 year and 1 month in prison.
- Stephanie Stockwell, eBay's Manager of Global Intelligence Center (GIC), pleaded guilty in October 2020 and was sentenced to 2 years of probation.
- Veronica Zea, who served eBay as an independent contractor working as an intelligence analyst in the GIC, pleaded guilty in October 2020 and was sentenced to two years probation including one year of home confinement.
- Brian Gilbert, a former police captain, and Senior Manager of Special Operations for eBay's Global Security Team, pleaded guilty in October 2020 and was sentenced to one year of probation plus time served.
- Philip Cooke, a former police captain, and supervisor of eBay security operations, pleaded guilty in October 2020 and was sentenced to 1-and-a-half years in federal prison and 3 years of supervised release including one year of home confinement.
- eBay entered a deferred prosecution agreement with the Department of Justice and agreed to pay a criminal penalty of $3 million, which is the statutory maximum fine for the six felony offenses the company had been charged with. As part of the agreement, eBay was required to retain an independent corporate compliance monitor for three years and to make extensive enhancements to its compliance program.

== Civil lawsuit ==
In July 2021, Ina and David Steiner filed a civil lawsuit against eBay Inc.; former CEO Devin Wenig; former Chief Communications Officer Steve Wymer; the seven defendants in the criminal case; and Progressive F.O.R.C.E. Concepts (PFC), an independent security firm. eBay's former SVP Global Operations Wendy Jones and Progressive F.O.R.C.E Concepts' CEO Steve Krystek were also added to an amended version of the complaint on March 1, 2023.

The lawsuit claims that Wenig and Wymer "provided the other Defendants with carte blanche authority to terminate the reporting of the Steiners by whatever means necessary, with Defendant Wymer expressing '... I want to see ashes. As long as it takes. Whatever it takes.' Defendant Wymer promised the defendants he would 'embrace managing any bad fallout' if the plan went south, further directing, 'We need to STOP her.' The lawsuit further claims that "All of the horrific, vicious and sickening conduct that followed was committed by employees of eBay and PFC, while acting in the scope of their employment under the authority of and for the benefit of eBay and PFC."

The civil trial was originally scheduled to begin on March 3, 2025, but was postponed until March 2, 2026.

On February 25, 2026, the parties settled the civil case for an undisclosed amount. The settlement collapsed and the Steiners asked a judge to reopen the case on June 12, 2026. On July 28, it was announced that the Steiners had agreed to settle the case against eBay for $56 million.

== Internal corporate investigation ==
After being contacted by law enforcement, eBay hired a law firm to investigate the harassment. The investigation concluded in September 2019, and all of the people charged with crimes plus the chief communications officer Steve Wymer were fired. The investigation found that neither Wenig nor Wymer "directed or knew that criminal acts would follow." Wymer was hired the next year as the head of a local branch of the Boys & Girls Clubs of America, a children's charity that knew about Wymer's involvement in the harassment scandal.

The CEO Wenig's messages were deemed "inappropriate" by eBay, but eBay's internal investigation concluded that the CEO did not know about the stalking and harassment activities. Wenig left eBay in September 2019, with a US$57 million severance package. After the harassment scandal became news, Wenig was re-elected to the board of General Motors.

== 60 Minutes investigation ==
CBS News' 60 Minutes profiled the scandal on its program in 2023. Of a book about surviving the death of a spouse which he received in the mail, David Steiner told correspondent Sharyn Alfonsi, "It was a death threat. And to be followed up a few short days later with a funeral wreath, an expensive funeral wreath, it only confirmed that these people were going to hurt or kill Ina....I was terrified I was gonna lose her."

Rosemary Scapicchio, an attorney representing the Steiners in their civil suit against eBay and its former executives, told 60 Minutes that Wymer deleted his text messages: "There was a notice that went out to everyone to say, 'There's this criminal investigation, preserve the evidence.' Wymer immediately deletes everything. That's obstruction of justice. If I did that I'd be sitting in a jail cell somewhere right now."

According to 60 Minutes, Wymer said his texts were "mischaracterized and that he learned of the employees' conduct only after the fact." Wenig, in a statement to the program, said that he was "appalled at what happened and had he been aware of it at the time he would have stopped it."

== In media ==
A documentary film about the scandal directed by Jenny Carchman, titled Whatever It Takes: Inside the eBay Scandal, was released in 2024.

In 2025, true crime podcast Swindled covered the case in an episode entitled "The White Knight."
