= Anthony Gignac =

Colombian-American con artist

Anthony Enrique Gignac
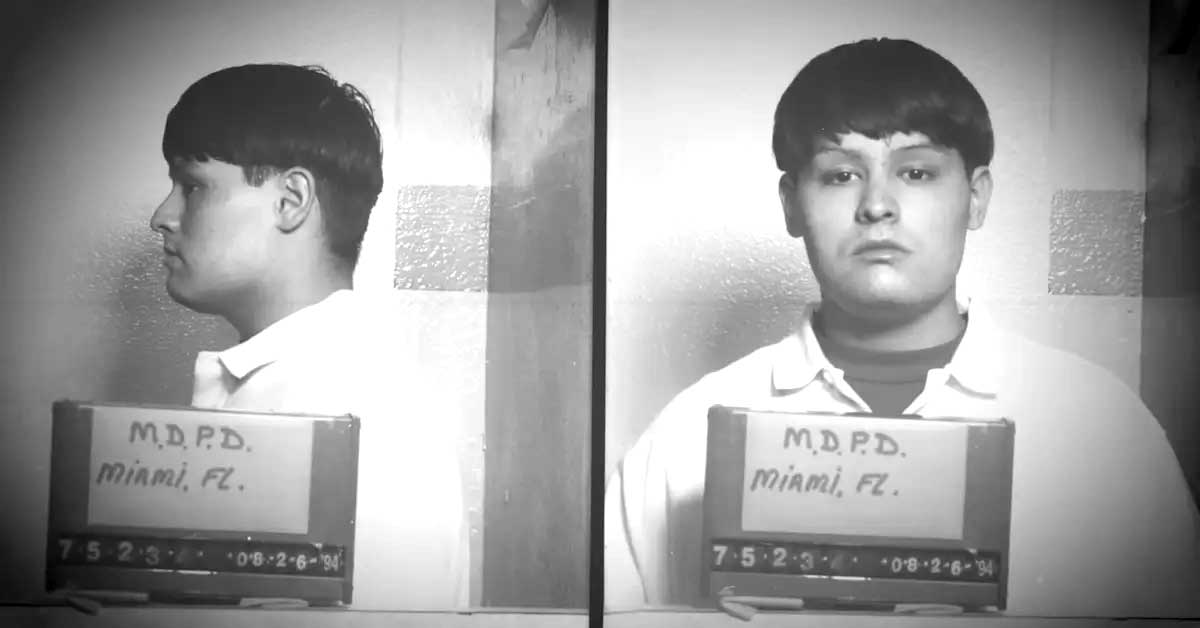
- 1994 mugshot of Anthony Gignac
- Born: José Moreno; July 20, 1970 (age 56); Colombia
- Other names: Prince Adnan Khashoggi, Prince Khalid bin Al Saud
- Occupations: Con man and fraudster
- Status: Serving prison sentence
- Convictions: Fraud, Identity theft, Impersonating a foreign diplomat
- Penalty: Several prison terms; most recently 30 years

Anthony Enrique Gignac (born José Moreno in July 20, 1970) is a convicted Colombian-born American fraudster and con artist. In a career spanning 30 years, Gignac used wealthy, high-ranking personas, most notably that of Saudi prince Khalid bin Al Saud, to fraudulently secure investment in a series of schemes that he presented as being backed by a large personal fortune. After defrauding funds of $8.1 million from investors, Gignac was arrested in 2017 after billionaire Jeffrey Soffer, the owner of the Fontainebleau Hotel (which Gignac had fraudulently claimed to be intending to invest in), became suspicious of the supposed Muslim prince ordering pork at a restaurant. He was jailed for over 18 years in 2019.

== Early life ==
Anthony and his younger brother, Daniel, were born in Colombia and orphaned at an early age. Gignac's difficult upbringing and the role he was forced to play as a caregiver for his brother have been cited as reasons for his descent into criminality later in life. In 1977, at the age of six, Gignac and his brother were adopted by a middle-class Michigan couple and moved to the United States.

== Criminal career ==
As early as age 12, Gignac began to pass himself off as a member of royalty, convincing a salesman at a Mercedes dealership to allow him to test-drive a car by claiming to be the son of a Saudi prince. Starting in 1988, Gignac had been arrested 11 times for schemes in which he impersonated a member of Saudi or Middle Eastern royalty, initially using the alias "Prince Adnan Khashoggi" (after the eponymous Saudi arms dealer), and later the "Prince Al Saud" persona. In 1991, the LA Times dubbed him the "Prince of Fraud" after a scheme in which he fraudulently racked up hotel and limousine bills, promising that they would be covered by members of the Saudi royal family, which resulted in a two-year jail sentence.

Gignac continued to engage in similar frauds throughout the 90s and early 2000s, using his false identity as a prince to run up bills of tens of thousands of US dollars, and coerce expensive "gifts" with the promise of striking beneficial deals with victims in the future. In one instance, he was able to convince American Express to issue him a platinum card with a $200 million credit limit under the name of the real Prince Al Saud, claiming that his previous card had been lost and that failing to supply him with a new one would anger his supposed father, the King. (Note: Although the father of the real Prince Khalid Al Saud, Salman of Saudi Arabia, would later become King, he was not crowned until 2015.) In 2003, Gignac was arrested after attempting to charge $29,000 of department store fees to the account of the real Prince Al Saud, which resulted in a 77-month conviction in 2006. Gignac claimed during his interrogation that he had been offered a real line of credit from the Saudi royal family as hush money after having an illicit homosexual affair with an actual Saudi prince.

In 2015, Gignac worked with a North Carolina business partner, Carl Marden Williamson, to set up the company Marden Williamson International, which was used to accrue funds for a variety of fraudulent international investment opportunities, including a purported private offering of a Saudi company. Gignac and his partners received investments totaling several million dollars in this scheme, including one investor who fronted $5 million. In 2017, Gignac made contact with billionaire Jeffery Soffer, claiming an interest in purchasing a $440 million stake in the Fontainebleau Hotel. Soffer initially believed Gignac's false identity, offering him rides in his private jet, and purchasing gifts of jewelry totalling over $50,000 to win the so-called prince's favour. However, Soffer became suspicious of Gignac after observing the purportedly Muslim prince order pork at a restaurant, and subsequently hired a private security firm to investigate him, ultimately leading to the uncovering of Gignac's true identity and his arrest. Gignac's associate, Carl Williamson, was also charged, but died following a suicide attempt shortly after being brought in for interrogation. In 2019, Gignac was sentenced to over 18 years in prison on charges of fraud, identity theft, and impersonating a foreign diplomat.

== In media ==
Gignac has been the subject of multiple documentary series, including Generation Hustle, an episode of American Greed, and episodes of the podcasts Scamfluencers and Swindled. A YouTube channel, Low Poly Shorts, featured Gignac's story in a long-format video.
