= Kelly Richmond Pope =

Kelly Richmond Pope is a forensic accountant, professor at DePaul University and filmmaker who analyzes corporate crime. Her 2017 documentary on Rita Crundwell's embezzlement from the city of Dixon, Illinois, All the Queen’s Horses, won the HBO Spotlight Award for Best Documentary at its World Premiere in 2017 and the Golden Laurels Award at the 2018 Beloit International Film Festival. In 2023, her book Fool Me Once: Scams, Stories, and Secrets from the Trillion-Dollar Fraud Industry was published by Harvard Business Review Press.
