= Joseph Miedzianowski =

Former Chicago police officer

- Born: Joseph Jerome Miedzianowski; 1953 or 1954 (age 72–73)
- Status: Incarcerated
- Criminal charges: Racketeering, drug conspiracy (2001)
- Penalty: Life

Details
- Imprisoned at: FCI Pekin

Joseph Jerome Miedzianowski is a former Chicago Police Department officer who was sentenced to life in prison without the possibility of parole for racketeering and drug conspiracy. He is known as Chicago's "most corrupt cop" for his part in a cocaine sales ring with street gang members and other corrupt police officers. During his 22-year police career, he received 59 citations for valor and arrests and was publicly praised for his high number of drug and illegal weapon busts. During this time he was also secretly leaking the identity of undercover police officers to gang members, extorting protection money from drug organizations, distributing crack cocaine, and supplying gang members with ammunition.

Miedzianowski's conviction led to the breakup of the department's anti-gang crimes unit.

In 2020, Miedzianowski requested a reduction in his sentence under the First Step Act. This request was denied.

In 2022 brothers Juan and Rosendo Hernandez had their murder convictions thrown out after requesting a retrial, based on claims that Detective Reynaldo Guevara had framed them at the request of Miedzianowski.

== In media ==
The third episode of the British documentary series Untouchable was focused on Miedzianowski.
