= Wenonah, Illinois =

- Village
- Location in Montgomery County, Illinois
- Coordinates: 39°19′12″N 89°17′17″W
- Country: United States
- State: Illinois
- County: Montgomery
- Township: Nokomis

Area
  - Total: 1.51 sq mi (3.92 km^{2})
  - Land: 1.51 sq mi (3.92 km^{2})
  - Water: 0 sq mi (0.00 km^{2})
- Elevation: 673 ft (205 m)

Population (2020)
  - Total: 32
  - Density: 21.1/sq mi (8.16/km^{2})
- Time zone: UTC-6 (CST)
  - Summer (DST): UTC-5 (CDT)
- ZIP code: 62075 (Nokomis)
- Area code: 217
- FIPS code: 17-79826
- GNIS feature ID: 2400124

Wenonah is a small village in Montgomery County, Illinois, United States. The population was 32 at the 2020 census.

== Geography ==
Wenonah is in northeastern Montgomery County and is bordered to the south by the city of Nokomis. It is 17 miles (27 km) northeast of Hillsboro, the county seat, and 14 miles (23 km) southwest of Pana.

According to the U.S. Census Bureau, Wenonah has a total area of 1.51 square miles (3.91 km^{2}), all land.

== Demographics ==
Historical population
Census	Pop.	Note	%±
1920	299		—
1930	122		−59.2%
1940	115		−5.7%
1950	125		8.7%
1960	102		−18.4%
1970	92		−9.8%
1980	70		−23.9%
1990	40		−42.9%
2000	44		10.0%
2010	37		−15.9%
2020	32		−13.5%
U.S. Decennial Census

As of the census of 2000, there were 44 people, 16 households, and 12 families residing in the village. The population density was 29.2 inhabitants per square mile (11.3/km^{2}). There were 17 housing units at an average density of 11.3 per square mile (4.3/km^{2}). The racial makeup of the village was 100.00% White.

There were 16 households, out of which 37.5% had children under the age of 18 living with them, 68.8% were married couples living together, and 25.0% were non-families. 25.0% of all households were made up of individuals, and 12.5% had someone living alone who was 65 years of age or older. The average household size was 2.75 and the average family size was 3.25.

In the village, the population was spread out, with 27.3% under the age of 18, 9.1% from 18 to 24, 20.5% from 25 to 44, 27.3% from 45 to 64, and 15.9% who were 65 years of age or older. The median age was 41 years. For every 100 females, there were 63.0 males. For every 100 females age 18 and over, there were 88.2 males.

The median income for a household in the village was $34,375, and the median income for a family was $46,250. Males had a median income of $45,417 versus $20,625 for females. The per capita income for the village was $19,890. None of the population and none of the families were below the poverty line.
