= Nokomis, Illinois =

- City
- Location in Montgomery County, Illinois
- Coordinates: 39°18′01″N 89°17′07″W
- Country: United States
- State: Illinois
- County: Montgomery
- Township: Nokomis

Government
  - Type: Municipal
  - Body: Mayor/Commissioner

Area
  - Total: 1.26 sq mi (3.27 km^{2})
  - Land: 1.26 sq mi (3.27 km^{2})
  - Water: 0 sq mi (0.00 km^{2})
- Elevation: 676 ft (206 m)

Population (2020)
  - Total: 2,142
  - Density: 1,697.6/sq mi (655.43/km^{2})
- Time zone: UTC−6 (CST)
  - Summer (DST): UTC−5 (CDT)
- ZIP code: 62075
- Area code: 217
- FIPS code: 17-53169
- GNIS feature ID: 2395243
- Website: cityofnokomis.com

Nokomis is a city in Montgomery County, Illinois, United States. The population was 2,142 at the 2020 census.

== Geography ==
Nokomis is in eastern Montgomery County, along Illinois Route 16 (State Street), which leads southwest 16 miles (26 km) to Hillsboro and northeast 13 miles (21 km) to Pana. Nokomis is bordered to the north by the village of Wenonah and to the southwest by the village of Coalton.

According to the U.S. Census Bureau, Nokomis has a total area of 1.3 square miles (3.37 km^{2}), all land. The city sits at the headwaters of the East Fork of Shoal Creek, a south-flowing tributary of the Kaskaskia River.

== Demographics ==
Historical population
| Census | Pop. | Note | %± |
|---|---|---|---|
| 1870 | 893 | | — |
| 1880 | 1,062 | | 18.9% |
| 1890 | 1,305 | | 22.9% |
| 1900 | 1,371 | | 5.1% |
| 1910 | 1,872 | | 36.5% |
| 1920 | 3,465 | | 85.1% |
| 1930 | 2,454 | | −29.2% |
| 1940 | 2,562 | | 4.4% |
| 1950 | 2,544 | | −0.7% |
| 1960 | 2,476 | | −2.7% |
| 1970 | 2,532 | | 2.3% |
| 1980 | 2,656 | | 4.9% |
| 1990 | 2,534 | | −4.6% |
| 2000 | 2,389 | | −5.7% |
| 2010 | 2,256 | | −5.6% |
| 2020 | 2,142 | | −5.1% |
U.S. Decennial Census

=== 2020 census ===
As of the 2020 census, Nokomis had a population of 2,142. The median age was 41.6 years. 24.8% of residents were under the age of 18 and 21.8% of residents were 65 years of age or older. For every 100 females there were 94.6 males, and for every 100 females age 18 and over there were 90.8 males age 18 and over.

0.0% of residents lived in urban areas, while 100.0% lived in rural areas.

There were 898 households in Nokomis, of which 31.2% had children under the age of 18 living in them. Of all households, 39.9% were married-couple households, 18.9% were households with a male householder and no spouse or partner present, and 33.0% were households with a female householder and no spouse or partner present. About 32.4% of all households were made up of individuals and 16.3% had someone living alone who was 65 years of age or older.

There were 1,022 housing units, of which 12.1% were vacant. The homeowner vacancy rate was 3.4% and the rental vacancy rate was 13.1%.

Racial composition as of the 2020 census
| Race | Number | Percent |
|---|---|---|
| White | 2,035 | 95.0% |
| Black or African American | 9 | 0.4% |
| American Indian and Alaska Native | 4 | 0.2% |
| Asian | 6 | 0.3% |
| Native Hawaiian and Other Pacific Islander | 2 | 0.1% |
| Some other race | 0 | 0.0% |
| Two or more races | 86 | 4.0% |
| Hispanic or Latino (of any race) | 33 | 1.5% |

=== 2000 census ===
As of the census of 2000, there were 2,389 people, 1,031 households, and 630 families residing in the city. The population density was 1,837.3 inhabitants per square mile (709.4/km^{2}). There were 1,130 housing units at an average density of 869.0 per square mile (335.5/km^{2}). The racial makeup of the city was 99.46% White, 0.25% Native American, 0.04% Asian, and 0.25% from two or more races. Hispanic or Latino of any race were 0.17% of the population.

There were 1,031 households, out of which 26.9% had children under the age of 18 living with them, 48.2% were married couples living together, 9.1% had a female householder with no husband present, and 38.8% were non-families. 35.1% of all households were made up of individuals, and 21.1% had someone living alone who was 65 years of age or older. The average household size was 2.21 and the average family size was 2.87.

In the city, the age distribution of the population shows 22.8% under the age of 18, 6.2% from 18 to 24, 24.6% from 25 to 44, 20.9% from 45 to 64, and 25.4% who were 65 years of age or older. The median age was 42 years. For every 100 females, there were 88.1 males. For every 100 females age 18 and over, there were 83.8 males.

The median income for a household in the city was $29,612, and the median income for a family was $36,850. Males had a median income of $35,106 versus $19,844 for females. The per capita income for the city was $16,328. About 10.7% of families and 14.3% of the population were below the poverty line, including 18.9% of those under age 18 and 9.9% of those age 65 or over.

== Notable people ==
- Jim Bottomley, Hall of Fame first baseman
- Reid Detmers, major league pitcher of the Los Angeles Angels
- Charles M. Easterday, Washington state senator
- Bud Foster, defensive coordinator for the Virginia Tech Hokies football team
- Bill Mizeur, pinch hitter for the St. Louis Browns
- Red Ruffing, Hall of Fame pitcher
- Charles Turzak, woodcut artist most famous for his Lincoln Wood Cuts

== Recreation ==
Nokomis is home to three public parks: Nokomis Community Memorial Park, Fred B. Johnson Nokomis City Park and the Shane P. Cole Memorial Park. Ramsey Lake State Recreation Area is 19 miles (31 km) southeast of Nokomis. The park offers fishing, camping, group camping, horseback riding, hiking trails, and three playgrounds.

== Media ==
- Nokomis Free Press-Progress, Nokomis' longstanding print newspaper since 1918
- Heartland Newsfeed, a digital news company based in Nokomis since 2016
