= United States v. Warshak =

United States court case

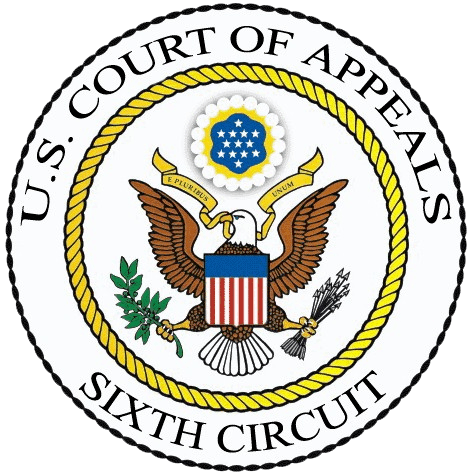
- Court: United States Court of Appeals for the Sixth Circuit
- Full case name: United States v. Steven Warshak et al.
- Argued: June 16 2010
- Decided: December 14 2010
- Citation: 631 F.3d 266; 2010 WL 5071766; 2010 U.S. App. LEXIS 25415;

Holding
- Government agents violated the defendant's Fourth Amendment rights when they compelled his ISP to produce the content of his emails without first obtaining a warrant based on probable cause.

Court membership
- Judges sitting: Damon Keith, Danny Boggs, and David McKeague

Case opinions
- Majority: Boggs, joined by McKeague
- Concurrence: Keith

Laws applied
- Fourth Amendment to the United States Constitution, Stored Communications Act 18 U.S.C. § 2701 et seq.

United States v. Warshak, 631 F.3d 266 (6th Cir. 2010) is a criminal case decided by the United States Court of Appeals for the Sixth Circuit holding that government agents violated the defendant's Fourth Amendment rights by compelling his Internet service provider (ISP) to turn over his emails without first obtaining a search warrant based on probable cause. However, constitutional violation notwithstanding, the evidence obtained with these emails was admissible at trial because the government agents relied in good faith on the Stored Communications Act (SCA). The court further declared that the SCA is unconstitutional to the extent that it allows the government to obtain emails without a warrant.

This case is notable because it is the first case from the United States Circuit Court of Appeals to explicitly hold that there is a reasonable expectation of privacy in the content of e-mails stored on third party servers and that the content of these emails is subject to Fourth Amendment protection.

== Background ==
=== Facts ===
Steven Warshak owned and operated Berkeley Premium Nutraceuticals, Inc. (Berkeley) which sold, among other products, an herbal supplement marketed as a pill for natural male enhancement, called Enzyte. His mother, Harriet Warshak, worked at Berkeley with him in the credit card department.

In 2001, Berkeley launched Enzyte and by 2004, Berkeley's annual sales approached $250 million, in large part due to the success of Enzyte. Enzyte was marketed extensively, and approximately 98% of the advertising was done on television featuring a character known as "Smilin' Bob." In some advertisements, Berkeley presented false information. Phony surveys were presented as fact at Warshak's request, the customer satisfaction rating of 96% was fabricated according to Warshak's request, and even the medical professionals who Berkeley claimed developed Enzyte were fictitious.

Sales of Berkeley's products occurred via telephone, email, and the Internet. Over the phone, Berkeley's sales force followed a script approved by Warshak designed to try to slip pertinent information past the customer. In the script, customers signing-up for a free trial were informed that they were being enrolled in an "auto-ship" program which would charge their credit card at the end of the first prescription period and send them a refill for their current prescription. To end this auto-shipping, customers had to opt out of the program. This program led to a large number of consumer complaints filed against Berkeley.

The auto-ship program and customers' dislike for this practice resulted in many orders being canceled. The canceled orders hurt Berkeley's reputation among banks and credit card companies who became reluctant to extend credit to Berkeley. To combat this, Warshak invented various ways of reducing the apparent percentage of refunded charges through questionable tactics. One tactic was to charge the customer's account multiple times for the same purchase, once for the purchase of the supplement and another time for shipping. Warshak referred to this as "double dinging". Later, he instituted the practice of "triple dinging" as well. Additionally, to secure other lines of credit, Warshak, along with his mother Harriet, provided false information to banks.

Much of the information about Warshak's questionable activities was contained in his email correspondence. In conjunction with a criminal investigation of Warshak and his questionable business practices, the government seized roughly 27,000 private emails from Warshak's ISP.

=== Procedural history ===
On June 12, 2006, Warshak filed a claim against the United States seeking a declaratory judgment and injunctive relief. Warshak claimed that the compelled disclosure violated his Fourth Amendment rights. The district court filed a preliminary injunction which was affirmed by the Sixth Circuit, finding that Warshak had a privacy interest in the content of his emails. However, that decision was reviewed by an en banc panel of the Sixth Circuit and vacated on ripeness grounds.

In September 2006, a grand jury in Ohio returned an indictment with more than 100 counts charging Warshak and his mother with various crimes including conspiracy to commit mail, wire, and bank fraud, mail fraud, bank fraud, and money laundering. Warshak moved before trial to exclude emails obtained from his ISP; which the court denied.

In January 2008, the case went to trial. Six weeks later Warshak and his mother were convicted of a majority of the charges. Shortly thereafter, a jury found that certain assets were sufficiently related to the crimes such that Warshak was ordered to forfeit illegally obtained gains.

In August 2008, the defendants were sentenced. Warshak received a prison term of 25 years, ordered to pay a fine of $93,000 and to forfeit the sums of $459,540,000 and $44,876,781.68 which represented the proceeds of the crimes. Harriet was sentenced to 24 months imprisonment and to be jointly and severally liable with Warshak for the forfeiture amounts.

The defendants appealed their convictions, sentences, and forfeiture judgments resulting in the opinion discussed here.

== Opinion of the court ==
=== Holding ===
The court held that government agents infringed upon Warshak's Fourth Amendment rights when they compelled his ISP to produce the content of his emails without first obtaining a warrant based on probable cause. As the government agents operated in good faith on provisions of the Stored Communications Act, the exclusionary rule was not applicable and reversal of Warshak's convictions was not warranted.

=== Stored Communications Act (SCA) ===
Under the SCA, agents of the government can request access to emails using an administrative subpoena or by obtaining a court order, depending on certain statutory classifications. Government agents ordered Warshak's ISP to store emails citing 18 U.S.C. § 2703(f) as granting them that authority. The government then ordered the ISP to turn over the content of Warshak's emails using a subpoena. Warshak was not informed that his ISP was archiving his email and he did not receive notice of the subpoena and order to his ISP until May 2006, nearly one year after the government served the subpoena.

=== Fourth Amendment ===
As stated by the United States Supreme Court, the purpose of the Fourth Amendment is "to safeguard the privacy and security of individuals against arbitrary invasions by government officials." To fall under the protection of the Fourth Amendment, the invasion by government officials must arise to the level of a search, which occurs when the government infringes upon "an expectation of privacy that society is prepared to consider reasonable." Thus, there is a two-part inquiry to decide if an invasion by the government qualifies as an unreasonable search under the Fourth Amendment:

- has the defendant manifested a subjective expectation of privacy in the object of the challenged search?
- is society willing to recognize that expectation as reasonable?

Analyzing the first prong of the two-part inquiry using the facts of the case, the Sixth Circuit found that Warshak manifested a subjective expectation of privacy in the content of his emails. The court reasoned that: "[g]iven the often sensitive and sometimes damning substance of his emails, we think it highly unlikely that Warshak expected them to be made public, for people seldom unfurl their dirty laundry in plain view."

The court then proceeded to the second prong of the inquiry, whether society is willing to accept Warshak's expectation of privacy as reasonable. The court stated that the question is of grave importance because email communication has assumed a prominent role in today's society. Moreover, the Fourth Amendment must not fall behind technological advances or it will "wither and die."

The court began by discussing traditional forms of communication such as letters and telephone calls. Each enjoys Fourth Amendment protection. This protection does not disappear even though intermediaries, such as the post office or a telephone company, are capable of accessing the content of communication. The court then stated that communication via email is akin to communication via letters and telephone calls because email is pervasive and can be personal. Furthermore, the court declared it would be incongruous to treat email, letters, and telephone calls differently because of the method of delivery. "It follows that email requires strong protection under the Fourth Amendment; otherwise, the Fourth Amendment would prove an ineffective guardian of private communication, an essential purpose it has long been recognized to serve."

Analogizing email to letters and telephone calls, the court declared that an ISP is the functional equivalent of the post office or telephone company. The government cannot compel them to turn over the content of communications absent a warrant based on probable cause. "It only stands to reason that, if government agents compel an ISP to surrender the contents of a subscriber's emails, those agents have thereby conducted a Fourth Amendment search, which necessitates compliance with the warrant requirement absent some exception."

The threat of possible access by an ISP to the content of a subscriber's email does not defeat this reasonable expectation of privacy, the court continued. Both the post office and telephone companies have the ability to access and the right to access, under certain conditions, the contents of a communication, yet these facts do not eliminate Fourth Amendment protection. There may be some cases where the subscriber agreement may be broad enough to defeat a reasonable expectation of privacy in the content of a subscriber's email, but the court held that this was not such a situation.

Finally, the court distinguished United States v. Miller which involved business records voluntarily given to a bank. Where Miller involved simple business records, the emails at issue here are personal and confidential and concern a wide variety of topics. Where the information in Miller was used in the ordinary course of business of the bank, the ISP here was an intermediary, not the intended recipient.

The court concluded that a subscriber enjoys a reasonable expectation of privacy in the contents of emails sent or received through, or stored with, a commercial ISP. Therefore, the government violated Warshak's Fourth Amendment rights when they obtained the contents of his emails. The court went on to declare: "to the extent that the SCA purports to permit the government to obtain such emails warrantlessly, the SCA is unconstitutional."

However, even though the government violated Warshak's Fourth Amendment rights, the illegally obtained emails were not subject to exclusionary rules of evidence because the agents of the government relied in good faith on the SCA. "Consequently, we find that, although the government violated the Fourth Amendment, the exclusionary rule does not apply, as the government relied in good faith on [18 U.S.C.] § 2703(b) and § 2703(d) to access the contents of Warshak's emails." The court held that the primary reason the exclusionary rule did not apply is because the deterrence rationale is lacking, quoting a prior decision, the court stated that "...where an officer acts in objectively reasonable reliance upon a statute that is later found unconstitutional, exclusion of the evidence would not deter future police misconduct."

=== Other issues ===
Additionally, the court sustained the convictions for conspiracy to commit mail, wire, and bank fraud, along with the convictions for mail fraud, bank fraud, and money laundering because the evidence was sufficient to support them. However, Warshak's sentence was vacated and remanded to the lower court because the court's previous ruling lacked an adequate explanation of losses to justify the sentence.

=== Result ===
The Sixth Circuit held that the government violated Steven Warshak's Fourth Amendment rights when it compelled his ISP to turn over the contents of his email without a warrant based on probable cause. However, the emails were not excluded from evidence because the government agents relied in good faith on the provisions of the SCA. As a result, the Sixth Circuit:

- AFFIRMED Warshak's convictions
- AFFIRMED the forfeiture judgments against him, VACATED the 25-year sentence, and REMANDED for resentencing.
- AFFIRMED Harriet's convictions except those related to money laundering, which were REVERSED
- VACATED and REMANDED Harriet's sentence
- AFFIRMED proceeds-money forfeiture judgment against Harriet
- REVERSED money-laundering forfeiture judgment against Harriet

=== Concurring opinion ===
The concurring opinion addressed the use of the SCA by the government to request that Warshak's ISP retain emails it would have otherwise deleted. Section 2703(f) of the SCA, according to Judge Keith, should have no prospective effect. The government's request that the ISP preserve Warshak's stored and future email communications without notifying Warshak is analogous to tapping his telephone line without a warrant. This type of action would not survive a challenge under the Fourth Amendment: "The government cannot use email collection as a means to monitor citizens without a warrant anymore than they can tap a telephone line to monitor citizens without a warrant." However, because Judge Keith's interpretation of § 2703(f) did not affect the outcome of the case, he concurred in the result.

== Subsequent proposed legislation ==
The Email Privacy Act, a bill introduced in the United States Congress, would codify the holding in Warshak, applying its rule nationwide.
