= Federal Correctional Institution, Pekin =

Medium-security prison in Illinois, US

Coordinates: 40°32′09″N 89°39′33″W

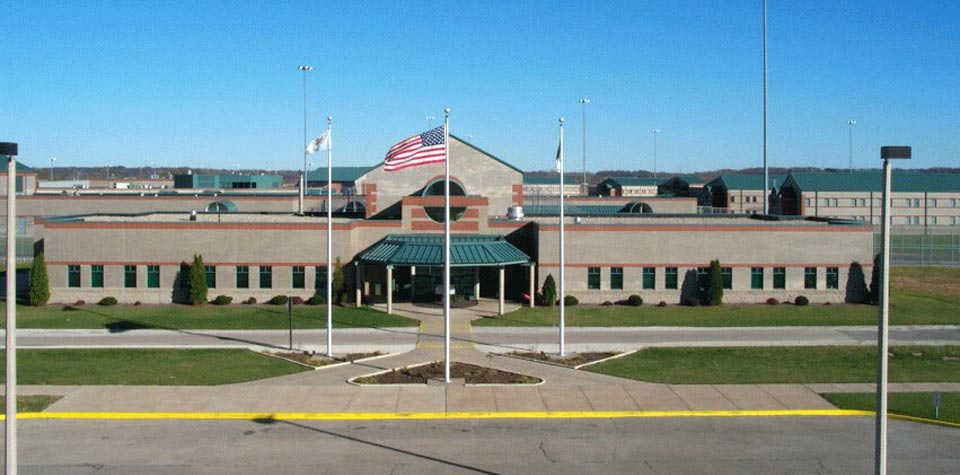
- Interactive map of Federal Correctional Institution, Pekin
- Location: Pekin, Illinois
- Status: Operational
- Security class: Medium-security (with minimum-security prison camp)
- Population: 1,200 (300 in prison camp)
- Opened: 1994
- Managed by: Federal Bureau of Prisons
- Website: Official website

The Federal Correctional Institution, Pekin (FCI Pekin) is a medium-security United States federal prison for male inmates in Illinois. It is operated by the Federal Bureau of Prisons, a division of the United States Department of Justice. The facility also has an adjacent satellite prison camp which houses minimum-security female offenders.

FCI Pekin is located approximately 10 miles south of Peoria, Illinois, 180 miles southwest of Chicago, and 180 miles northeast of St. Louis, Missouri. It is located within the city limits of Pekin, Illinois.

Kathy Kelly, who had been incarcerated in the Pekin complex, wrote the book Other Lands Have Dreams: From Baghdad to Pekin Prison. Shon Hopwood, while serving time in FCI Pekin, became an accomplished United States Supreme Court practitioner by the time he was released in 2008.

== History ==
In 1988 the mayor and four city council members voted on whether to welcome a federal prison that was scheduled to open in the area. 13,665 people had voted in a previous advisory referendum which had seen a slim 3/4% margin of victory for those not in favor of the prison. Therefore, the mayor and two council members who voted for the prison faced political backlash: the mayor and one member were defeated at re-election and another member did not run again. In 1994 the prison opened in land in far southern Pekin that had been newly annexed. The minimum security camp opened in 1994 and previously housed females. In May 2011 the female population was replaced by a male population so the federal authorities could have more space for in-house drug treatment programs for men.

On the 20th anniversary of the prison's opening, Michael Smothers of GateHouse Media Illinois wrote that no significant opposition to the prison remained, and so did Mayor of Pekin Laurie Barra and the Pekin Chief of Police Greg Nelson. Smothers added that there were no protests occurring.

== Facilities and operations ==
As of 2011 the medium security area housed about 1,200 prisoners while the minimum security facility housed about 300 prisoners.

As of 1994 the FPC Pekin minimum security complex was composed of two dormitories and a central compound with classrooms, office buildings, and recreation buildings surrounded by grass. The prison did not have razor wire fences nor guard towers. Mark S. Fleisher and Jennifer A. Harrington, authors of "Freelisting: Management at a Women's Federal Prison Camp", wrote that the minimum security camp "resembles a small college campus" and "does not fit the stereotype of a prison."

The prison camp population often did volunteer work around the community. When FPC Pekin housed women, there were issues as women were not permitted to do certain jobs requested by area non-profit organizations.

The minimum security camp houses females since at least 2018.

== Notable incidents ==
=== Death of Adam Montoya ===
On the morning of November 13, 2009, 36-year-old inmate Adam Montoya was found dead in his cell at FCI Pekin. Montoya had arrived at FCI Pekin 18 days before to begin serving a 27-month sentence for check fraud. An autopsy concluded that Montoya had been suffering from cancer of the spleen, hepatitis and HIV. The immediate cause of death was internal bleeding due to a ruptured spleen, caused by the cancer.

Tazewell County Coroner Dennis Conover and other experts concluded that Montoya likely exhibited blatant symptoms of hepatitis and cancer, most notably dramatic weight loss, a swollen abdomen and yellow eyes. They said that those symptoms, as well as the severe pain Montoya complained of, should have prompted staff to transport the prisoner immediately to the hospital. The Associated Press quoted Conover as stating, "He shouldn't have died in agony like that ... he had been out there long enough that he should have at least died in the hospital."

During Montoya's final days, he "consistently made requests to the prison for medical attention, and they wouldn't give it to him", said his father, Juan Montoya, who described how his son repeatedly punched the panic button seeking help. Three inmates corroborated that account in interviews with the Associated Press. Montoya's family filed a wrongful death and personal injury claim, which was denied by the Justice Department. A lawsuit is pending.

== Notable inmates (current and former) ==
| Inmate name | Register number | Status | Details |
|---|---|---|---|
| Matthew Owens | 02086–122 | Received a 101-year sentence handed down in the 2003 murder of Sonja Ivanoff, 19. | Matthew Owens is a former Nome, Alaska police officer. The Sonja Ivanoff Law passed by Alaska Legislature in 2007 resulted from this case. The law mandates a police officer convicted of committing murder while on duty be sentenced to 99 years in prison. The release date for Owens is 04/09/2106. |
| Tony Rezko | 19050-424 | Was serving a 10-year sentence; transferred to a halfway house pending his release. Released from custody on May 5, 2016. | Former top fundraiser to former Illinois Governor Rod Blagojevich; convicted in 2008 of fraud, money laundering and bribery in connection with his plotting to take more than $9.6 million in kickbacks from firms seeking state business. |
| Joseph Miedzianowski | 11502-424 | Serving a life sentence. | Former Chicago Police officer; convicted in 2003 of racketeering and conspiracy for running a cocaine distribution organization composed of other officers and gang members; known as the most corrupt police officer in Chicago history. |
| John Tomkins | 19421-424 | Serving a 37-year sentence; scheduled for release in 2038. Currently at USP Thomson. | Iowa machinist; convicted in 2012 of mailing a dozen threatening letters and two pipe bombs to investment firms between 2005 and 2007 as part of a terror campaign aimed at driving up the value of stock he owned in two companies. |
| Shon Hopwood | 15632-047 | Released in 2009; served an 11-year sentence. | Pleaded guilty in 1998 to robbing five Nebraska banks in 1997 and 1998; earned a Juris Doctor Degree and became a judicial law clerk, Supreme Court practitioner, and prison reform advocate after his release. |
| Rita Crundwell | 44540-424 | Serving a nearly 20-year sentence. Currently in the custody of RRM Chicago. Scheduled for release in 2028. | Pleaded guilty in 2012 to embezzling over $53 million from the city of Dixon. Was the subject of All the Queen's Horses, a 2017 documentary by Kartemquin Films. |
| Karen Littlefair | 00983-509 | Released in 2020; served a 5-month sentence. | Pled guilty to connection with the 2019 college admissions bribery scandal. |
| Yori von Kahl | 04565-059 | Serving a life sentence. | Son of Gordon Wendell Kahl, who shot and killed two U.S. Marshals near Medina, North Dakota, in February 1983. |

== See also ==
- List of U.S. federal prisons
- Federal Bureau of Prisons
- Incarceration in the United States
