= Andrew Lelling =

American attorney (born 1970)

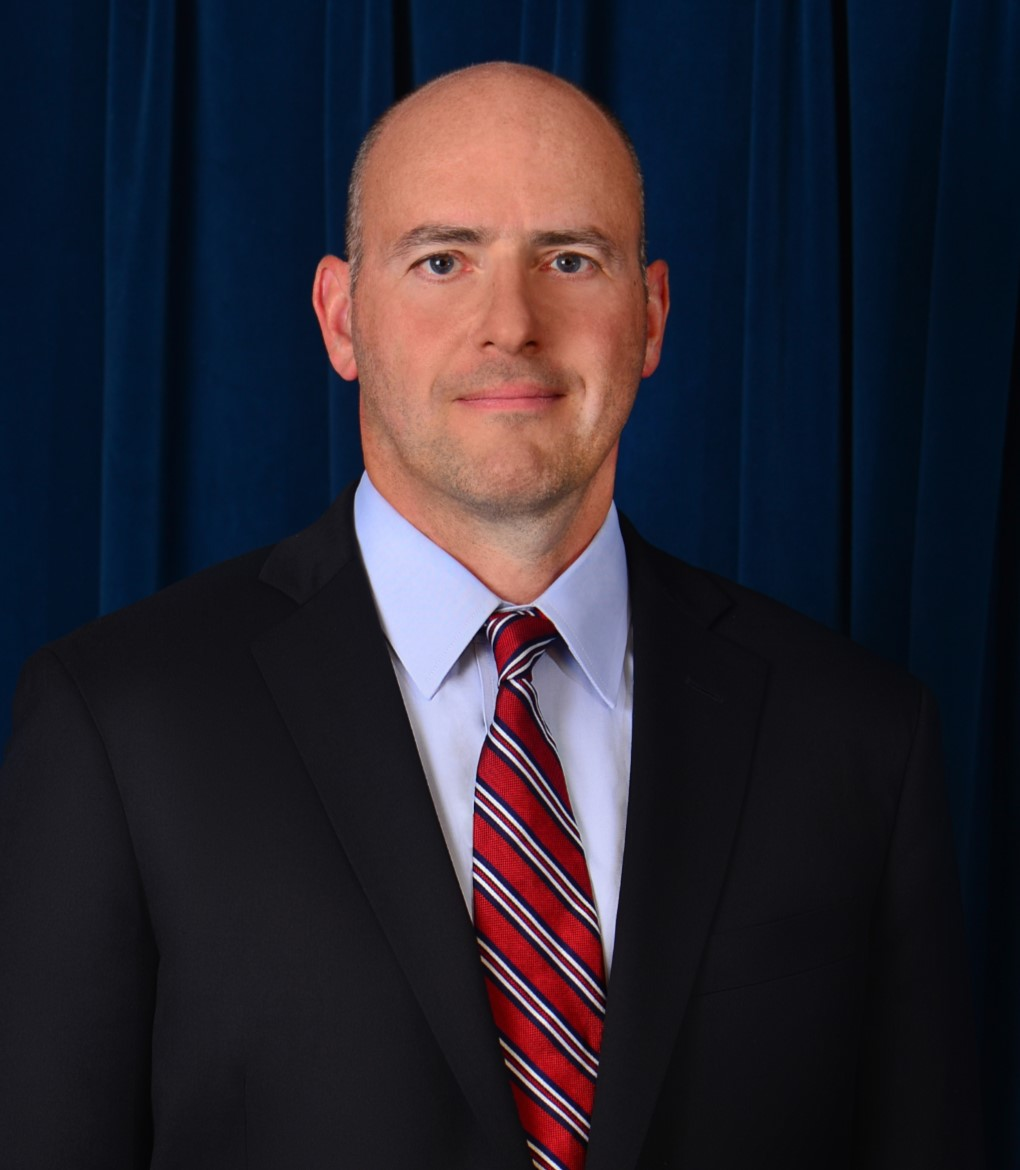
- Official portrait, 2017

United States Attorney for the District of Massachusetts
- In office December 21, 2017 – February 28, 2021
- President: Donald Trump; Joe Biden
- Preceded by: Carmen Ortiz
- Succeeded by: Rachael Rollins

Personal details
- Born: 1970 (age 55–56)
- Party: Republican
- Spouse: Dana Gershengorn
- Children: 2
- Education: Binghamton University (BA); University of Pennsylvania (JD)

Andrew E. Lelling (born 1970) is an American attorney who served as the United States Attorney for the District of Massachusetts from 2017 to 2021.

He is best known for leading Operation Varsity Blues, the federal investigation and prosecution of a massive nationwide college admissions scandal, He also oversaw the largest-ever prosecution of MS-13, which all but eliminated the notorious Salvadoran gang in the Boston area and the prosecution of six eBay employees involved in the eBay stalking scandal which involved the terrorizing of a middle-aged couple living in greater Boston, Massachusetts. His tenure was also marked by major gang and healthcare enforcement actions. Lelling, however, was also criticized by some as being "overzealous, grandstanding, and politically motivated" for his prosecution of a local trial judge who helped an undocumented immigrant charged with drug crimes avoid arrest by immigration authorities.

== Early life and education ==
Lelling grew up in Rockland County, New York, the son of Irwin, a dentist, and Selma. Lelling received a Bachelor of Arts in literature and rhetoric from Binghamton University in 1991 and graduated from the University of Pennsylvania Law School in 1994. Lelling clerked for Berry Avant Edenfield of the United States District Court for the Southern District of Georgia. He went on to serve as counsel to the Assistant Attorney General at the United States Department of Justice Civil Rights Division and as an Assistant United States Attorney in the Eastern District of Virginia.

== U.S. Attorney's Office ==
At the time of his nomination to serve as U.S. Attorney for the District of Massachusetts, Lelling had served for 12 years as senior litigation counsel for the U.S. Attorney's Office for the District of Massachusetts, prosecuting white collar crime, international drug trafficking, and other offenses. He is a member of the Federalist Society and a former member of the Boston Bar Journal's board of editors. He assumed office on December 21, 2017.

During his tenure with the U.S. Attorney's Office in Massachusetts, Lelling led the prosecution of a billion-dollar pyramid scheme that defrauded almost 2 million investors. A former executive of Telexfree was sentenced to six years in federal prison for his involvement in the scheme. Lelling also helped prosecute Carlos Rafael, a fishing magnate known as "the Codfather" who pleaded guilty to mislabeling hundreds of thousands of pounds of fish, allowing him to illegally increase his profit margin via environmental fraud. He successfully prosecuted several golfing buddies for trading on inside information about American Superconductor.

On February 8, 2021, along with 55 other Trump-era attorneys, Lelling was asked to resign. Lelling announced his resignation on February 10, 2021, effective February 28. Lelling joined Cleveland-based law firm Jones Day following his resignation. In late 2021, it was reported that he was considering a run for Massachusetts' Republican gubernatorial nomination, but he ultimately decided not to.

== Notable prosecutions ==
=== 2019 college admissions bribery scandal (Operation Varsity Blues) ===
In 2019, Lelling announced charges in the Varsity Blues scandal and led the prosecution. The ringleader, William Singer, pled guilty to multiple charges of conspiracy and obstruction of justice and multiple parents were indicted. Ultimately, 53 people were charged in the scandal, and Singer was sentenced in January 2023 to three and a half years in prison plus forfeiture of over $10 million. The case was the most significant federal prosecution related to higher education ever attempted by the U.S. Justice Department It led to significant changes in college admissions processes and was the basis for a best-selling book by two Wall Street Journal reporters and a popular Netflix documentary about the case.

=== Indictment of Massachusetts trial court judge ===
In April 2019, Lelling indicted Massachusetts trial court judge Shelley M. Richmond Joseph and now-retired Court Officer Wesley MacGregor on obstruction of justice charges arising from an April 2, 2018, incident where the judge and the court officer allowed an undocumented immigrant to leave the Newton District Court through a rear entrance, alleging that this was done to help the man evade arrest from U.S. Immigration and Customs Enforcement. Lelling said in part at the news conference announcing the indictments, "We did not bring this case in response to the public debate over immigration enforcement. There are reasonable arguments on both sides of that debate, but this isn't a policy seminar, it's a law enforcement action."

The case was controversial. Former Massachusetts Supreme Judicial Court justice Geraldine S. Hines said of Lelling's decision to prosecute that "Maybe he's trying to get on Trump's radar for whatever reason, and this is certainly the kind of thing that's going to get attention in Washington...it's a way to get yourself noticed." In contrast, former senior U.S. Justice Department official Ralph Boyd Jr., praised the prosecution as "principled" and that "it's rare to find public servants willing to enforce the law regardless of status, privilege, or political considerations."

In September 2022, the Shelly Joseph case was dismissed by Zachary Cunha, a United States Attorney appointed by President Biden. Following the prosecution, Joseph's attorney claimed: "This was a patently political indictment, blindly grounded in prosecutorial ambition. We are hopeful that it will result in a long deserved dismissal - which we take as full and complete exoneration." As part of the agreement to drop the charges, Judge Joseph admitted to certain conduct, including, during the hearing before the undocumented immigrant was released, saying, "Is ICE gonna get him?," before turning off the courtroom recording for 52 seconds. Joseph admitted that, after the recording was turned back on, the undocumented immigrant was released out the back door of the courthouse. Responding to the dropping of the charges, Lelling said that prosecutors will differ in a given case, especially unusual ones, and that he respected the "thoughtful decision-making here". Lelling also said, "What the agreed factual statement carefully avoids is requiring Judge Joseph to confirm or deny that she intentionally conspired to help the defendant evade federal authorities. A federal grand jury concluded that she did, and that would be a serious, politically motivated abuse of her position."

=== INSYS prosecution ===
As U.S. Attorney, Lelling oversaw the successful prosecution of several high-level employees of INSYS Therapeutics Inc. for contributing to the national opioid overdose crisis, a first-of-its-kind federal RICO prosecution of corporate executives during the opioid epidemic. Convicted defendants included the chief executive officer of Insys, John Kapoor, as well as several managers and sales staff, who had aggressively marketed a powerful fentanyl-based drug for off-label use. Kapoor was sentenced to 66 months in prison. The prosecution was hailed as "a landmark trial." "Experts saw the trial as sending a message to drug companies that they will be held criminally accountable for their alleged role in fueling the opioid crisis."

=== The China Initiative ===
In November 2018 Lelling was asked to work with a handful of other U.S. Attorneys and senior officials at the U.S. Justice Department and the FBI to create the China Initiative. Begun by the Department of Justice (DOJ) under then–US President Donald Trump's first Attorney General Jeff Sessions in 2018, with the goal of preventing industrial espionage and other theft of U.S. technology for the benefit of the Chinese government. Trump and his administration believed that China was using corporate employees, researchers and students to steal American technological innovations. In response, the China Initiative was conceived as a program to prosecute certain corporate employees, science researchers and academics suspected of misappropriating technology for, or hiding ties with, China. Though the Department of Justice did not strictly define what a China Initiative case is, many of the cases involved researchers who intentionally omitted Chinese funding on grant applications.

The Department of Justice announced the end of the program on February 23, 2022, amid criticism of racial profiling of Chinese American citizens as well as residents of Chinese origin and ancestry from other nations. Lelling rejected criticism that the DOJ's was targeting people based on their ethnicity, noting that, because China was nearly 100% Han Chinese, there would unfortunately be a disproportional number of defendants of Chinese ethnicity

Lelling oversaw several high-profile cases brought under the initiative. In January 2020, Lelling announced the indictment of Prof. Charles M. Lieber, a Caucasian male and head of Harvard University's Chemistry Department, for hiding financial ties to China from the U.S. government. In December 2021, Lieber was convicted at trial on all counts.

In another China Initiative case, Lelling announced in January 2021 the indictment of MIT professor Gang Chen, charging him of hiding ties with China in a grant application. Lelling alleged that Chen failed to disclose various connections to Chinese government programs on DOE grant applications, including appointments to promote PRC technological and scientific development and providing scientific expertise in exchange for compensation. The charges alleged that Chen received significant funding from China for programs at MIT. During a press conference announcing the charges Lelling stated "the allegations of the complaint imply that this was not just about greed, but about loyalty to China." A federal judge found the statement "inappropriate" and "not well advised" but not sanctionable.

On January 22, 2021, MIT's president released a statement arguing out that these funds went to not Chen, but to MIT itself to support a departmental research collaboration with SUSTech which Chen directed on MIT's behalf.

On January 14, 2022, about a year after Lelling's departure from the U.S. Attorney's Office, the Wall Street Journal reported that federal prosecutors had recommended dropping the criminal charges against Professor Chen. The same day, The Washington Post reported the DOE had now decided that Chen's omissions from grant applications were not material, meaning that the information would not have affected DOE's determination of whether to make the grant. The new U.S. Attorney in Boston implied that this problem with proving the materiality of the omitted information led to dismissal of the charges, saying "We recently obtained additional information pertaining to the materiality of Professor Chen's alleged omissions in the context of the grant review process at issue in this case. After a careful assessment of this new information in the context of all the evidence, our office has concluded that we can no longer meet our burden of proof at trial." On January 20, 2022, federal prosecutors filed a motion to drop the charges "in the interests of justice", and the US District Court dismissed the case.

Once in private practice, Lelling said the "academic side" of the China Initiative had "drifted some and needed recalibrating." When asked why these cases are not as successful as other types of cases, Lelling stated "Overall it has been handled professionally...the problem you have though is that when the Department makes mistakes, those mistakes make a big impact on the public."

In a New York Times interview published after his exoneration, Chen described the experience as "traumatic and deeply disillusioning". After the charges were filed he was banned from the MIT campus and from contacting MIT employees. The postdocs he worked with were moved to other labs. He no longer had a research group or funding, and until the charges were dropped he worked alone on other topics.

== Personal life ==
Lelling is married to Massachusetts juvenile court judge Dana Gershengorn and they have two children.
