= C. M. Easterday =

American politician

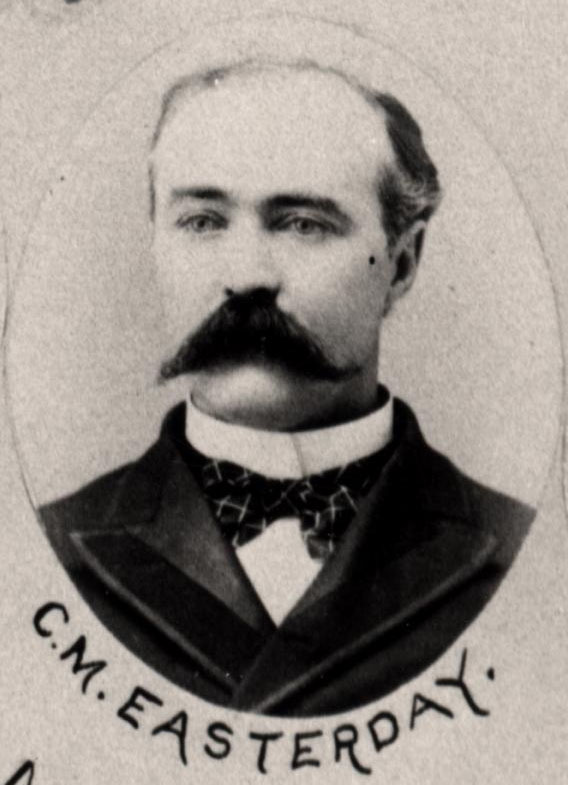
- Easterday in 1895

Member of the Washington State Senate for the 23rd district
- In office 1891–1899

Personal details
- Born: December 17, 1855 Illinois, United States
- Died: December 4, 1918 (aged 62) Tacoma, Washington, United States
- Party: Republican; Silver Republican

Charles M. Easterday (December 17, 1855 – December 4, 1918) was an American politician who served in the Washington State Senate from 1891 to 1899.

Easterday was born in Nokomis, Illinois and attended Carthage College and the University of Nebraska. He received an LL.B. from the University of Iowa in 1871.

He served as a Pierce County Court Judge from 1908 to 1918.
