= Doc Gallagher =

American convict

William Neil "Doc" Gallagher is an American Christian radio host and fraudster. He stole $24 million from over 190 people in a Ponzi scheme over the course of a decade. His victims ages ranged from 62 to 91. He was sentenced to life in prison for the crime and made to pay $10 million in restitution.
