= John Tomkins =

American criminal

John Patrick Tomkins is an American who was convicted of sending several threatening letters and bomb-like devices to financial firms in the Midwestern United States under the pseudonym The Bishop. A machinist and lifelong resident of Dubuque, Iowa, he is now serving a 37-year sentence in federal prison.

== Crime ==
Beginning in 2005, threatening letters were sent to various financial institutions, demanding that certain stock prices be raised to $6.66 (the Biblical "Number of the Beast"). The letters were signed by "The Bishop". The return addresses on the letters were from various cities in the Midwest. The sender set deadlines for the stock prices to be changed, and threatened to take action if the deadlines were not met. The companies to whom the letters were sent had no way of manipulating stock prices, and the deadlines passed with no action from them.

In January 2007, The Bishop mailed two pipe bombs, one to American Century Investments in Kansas City, and the other to Janus Capital Group in Denver, which was in turn accidentally forwarded to a subsidiary investment firm located in the downtown Chicago area known as The Loop. The bombs had vital parts missing, and are believed to have been meant as warnings. A typed letter accompanied each device, suggesting that if certain demands were not met more letter bombs would follow.

Security analysts who had examined "The Bishop"'s modus operandi speculate that he may be emulating the 1972 Charles Bronson movie The Mechanic. In the movie, Bronson portrays an assassin named "Arthur Bishop", who uses bombs to kill others. Bronson also leaves a note for an intended victim saying "Bang, you're dead"—the same text was found in notes sent by "The Bishop" in his suspicious packages.

== Arrest ==
On April 25, 2007, U.S. law enforcement agencies in Dubuque, Iowa, arrested John Tomkins of Dubuque, whom they believed to be "The Bishop." The authorities had identified the suspect as a 42-year-old former postal worker. He had been described as a machinist who was married. This did not fit the original criminal profile created by the FBI.

According to sources, analyzing and following stock trading records led U.S. Postal Service investigators to the suspect. Also, it was reported that a photograph included in an October 25, 2005, threat letter showed the window of the vehicle from which the photograph was taken. The vehicle was identified as a four-door Chevrolet Lumina. The suspect was observed driving a red 1993 Chevrolet Lumina. The interior of the vehicle appeared to match the vehicle shown in the photograph.

After the authorities surveilled the suspect for a lengthy period and built their case, search and arrest warrants were executed. Because of the nature of The Bishop's alleged crimes—sending IEDs (improvised explosive devices) through the mail—the possibility that he could detonate an IED while being arrested was a major safety concern.

After the arrest warrant was served, authorities in Dubuque evacuated part of an apartment complex when a bomb-sniffing dog stopped at a storage locker connected to the suspect. The apartment complex was located about a mile from the suspect's residence on the west side of town.

A KWWL news story said that friends and family expressed great surprise at the suspect's arrest. The same story indicated he was very active in the local Eagles lodge

== Punishment ==
The mailings were said to have occurred in Des Moines, Iowa, Milwaukee, Wisconsin, and Chicago, Illinois, regions. The government chose the Northern District of Illinois as the venue for prosecution. None of the offenses are alleged to have occurred in Dubuque, which is in the jurisdiction of the United States District Court for the Northern District of Iowa. Des Moines is in the territory of the United States District Court for the Southern District of Iowa.

On September 18, 2007, a special federal grand jury returned a 15-count indictment. The suspect was charged with ten counts of securities fraud, two counts of mailing threatening letters to further a scheme of extortion, two counts of possessing an unregistered explosive device, and one count of using an explosive device in the commission of a crime.

On March 6, 2009, a federal judge dismissed the ten counts of securities fraud, ruling the charges did not apply to the suspect because no attempt was made to manipulate the stock market. The suspect still faced five federal destructive device charges.

On April 30, 2009, prosecutors filed a new 13-count indictment based on the findings of a new grand jury. The indictment charged the former postal worker with two counts of possession of an unregistered destructive device, one count of using such a device while committing a violent crime, and ten counts of mailing a threatening communication with the intent to commit extortion. Tomkins remained held without bail at a Chicago federal prison.

On July 21, 2010, Tomkins backed out of a plea deal and filed a motion to act as his own attorney at trial. He told the court that he would plead guilty to the 12 lesser counts in the hope that prosecutors would drop the 13th count to avoid a trial. That count, possession of a destructive device while committing a violent crime, carries a minimum sentence of 30 years in prison. Tomkins told the court, "If they insist on a trial, a trial they'll have. It's going to be lengthy. I'm going to defend myself to the best of my ability."

In 2012, Tomkins defended himself at trial in Chicago. He admitted sending the packages but insisted they would never have exploded. On May 4, 2012, after deliberating for about two hours, a jury found him guilty of nine counts of extortion and three counts relating to the pipe bombs, including one count of "building, possessing and delivering a destructive device."

Tomkins was sentenced to 37 years in federal prison on May 21, 2013. He is currently incarcerated at the Federal Correctional Institution, Pekin, a medium-security facility in Illinois, and is scheduled for release in 2039.
