= Easterday, Kentucky =

Unincorporated community in Kentucky, United States

- Unincorporated community
- Location within the state of Kentucky Easterday (the United States)
- Coordinates: 38°40′32″N 85°4′28″W
- Country: United States
- State: Kentucky
- County: Carroll
- Elevation: 682 ft (208 m)
- Time zone: UTC-5 (Eastern (EST))
  - Summer (DST): UTC-4 (EDT)
- GNIS feature ID: 507902

Easterday is an unincorporated community that is located in Carroll County, Kentucky, United States. Its post office is closed.
