= Enzyte =

Herbal nutritional supplement

Enzyte is an American herbal nutritional supplement originally manufactured by Berkeley Premium Nutraceuticals. The marketing of Enzyte resulted in a conviction and prison term for the company's owner and bankruptcy of the company. The product is now marketed by Vianda, LLC of Cincinnati, Ohio. The manufacturer has claimed that Enzyte promotes "natural male enhancement," which is a euphemism for increasing penis size. However, its effectiveness has been called into doubt and the claims of the manufacturer have been under scrutiny from various state and federal organizations. Kenneth Goldberg, medical director of the Male Health Center at Baylor University, says, "It makes no sense medically. There's no way that increasing blood flow to the penis, as Enzyte claims to do, will actually increase its size."

In March 2005, following thousands of consumer complaints to the Better Business Bureau, federal agents raided Berkeley facilities, gathering material that resulted in a 112-count criminal indictment. The company's founder and CEO, Steven M Warshak, and his mother, Harriet Warshak, were found guilty of conspiracy to commit mail fraud, bank fraud, and money laundering, and in September 2008 they were sentenced to prison and ordered to forfeit $500 million in assets. The convictions and fines forced the company into bankruptcy, and in December 2008 its assets were sold for $2.75 million to investment company Pristine Bay, which continued operations.

Enzyte is widely advertised on U.S. television as "The once-daily tablet for natural male enhancement", or "The one-a-day tablet for natural male enhancement." The commercials feature a character known as "Smilin' Bob," acted out by Canadian actor Andrew Olcott, who, in the commercials, always wears a smile that is implied to result from the enhancing effects of Enzyte; these advertisements feature double entendres. Some such commercials also feature an equally smiling "Mrs. Bob."

Because Enzyte is an herbal product, no testing is required by the U.S. Food and Drug Administration. An official of the Federal Trade Commission division that monitors advertising says the lack of scientific testing is "a red flag right away. There's no science behind these claims." The company has conceded that it has no scientific studies that substantiate any of its Enzyte claims.

Ira Sharlip, a spokesman for the American Urological Association, has said, "There is no such thing as a penis pill that works. These are all things that are sold for profit. There's no science or substance behind them."

== Ingredients ==
Enzyte's formulation was reportedly developed for Vianda by Marilyn Barrett.

Enzyte is said to contain:

- Asian Ginseng Root Extract
- Grape Seed Extract
- Epimedium (Horny Goat Weed)
- Zinc oxide
- Muira puama
- Ginkgo biloba
- Niacin
- Copper

Most of the above ingredients are commonly available as over the counter herbal or dietary supplements, and most have anecdotal reports, but marginal or unproven scientific evidence, of efficacy on various systems in the human body. Several of the herbal ingredients are included only in very low quantities.

Yohimbe was previously included in the original formulation of Enzyte, produced until at least 2004. However, as yohimbe's legal status in Canada is unclear, Enzyte produced after 2004 no longer contains yohimbe extract.

Additionally, zinc is an ingredient in Enzyte. Some men who have low zinc levels in their body have had success using zinc supplements to treat erection problems.

== Effectiveness ==
Currently, the effectiveness of Enzyte is unproven.

A civil lawsuit alleged Enzyte does not work as advertised. Despite manufacturer claims that Enzyte will increase penis size, girth, and firmness and improve sexual performance, there exists no scientific evidence that Enzyte is capable of making good on these claims. In fact, Enzyte has never been scientifically tested by the FDA or other independent third party. Accordingly, Enzyte is required by current U.S. law to be marketed as an herbal supplement and may not legally be called a drug. In keeping with FTC rulings, Enzyte is not allowed to claim these benefits in its advertising. However, as of June 2010, TV commercials for the product still use the phrase "natural male enhancement."

== Federal indictment and trial ==
Thousands of consumer complaints were made to the Better Business Bureau about the company's business practices, especially the "autoship" program that repeatedly charged customers' credit cards for refills even after they canceled their orders. Federal agents raided Berkeley facilities in March 2005, gathering material that led to criminal charges. On September 21, 2006, Berkeley Premium Nutraceuticals; its owner and president, Steve Warshak; and five other individuals were indicted by the United States, Southern District of Ohio, U.S. Attorney Greg Lockhart, on charges of conspiracy, money laundering, and mail, wire, and bank fraud. The indictment alleged that the company defrauded consumers and banks of US$100 million. The United States Food and Drug Administration, Internal Revenue Service, United States Postal Inspection Service, and other agencies participated in the investigation. The federal fraud trial began on January 8, 2008.

In testimony during the trial, a former executive with Berkeley testified that the enhancements the company claimed were achieved by use of Enzyte were fabricated, and the company defrauded customers by continuing to charge them for additional shipments of the supplement. He further testified that company employees were instructed to make it as difficult as possible for unhappy customers to receive refunds.

=== Conviction and sentencing ===
On February 22, 2008, Steven Warshak was found guilty of 93 counts of conspiracy, fraud, and money laundering. On August 27, 2008, he was sentenced by U.S. District Judge Arthur Spiegel to 25 years in prison and ordered to pay $93,000 in fines. Warshak was an inmate at the Federal Correctional Institution in Elkton, Ohio. His company, Berkeley Premium Nutraceuticals, along with other defendants, was ordered to forfeit $500 million. His 75-year-old mother, Harriet Warshak, was sentenced to two years in prison but released on bond pending appeal after turning over her house, bank accounts, and other assets related to her crimes.

Both Steven and Harriet Warshak appealed their convictions. The United States Court of Appeals for the Sixth Circuit in United States v. Warshak (6th Cir. December 14, 2010) 631 F.3d 266, upheld Steven Warshak's convictions and all convictions against Harriet Warshak except for money laundering and vacated their sentences, remanding the sentencing to the lower court.

On September 21, 2011, Steven Warshak's sentence was reduced from 25 years to 10 years. His mother's sentence was reduced from two years to one day, and she never served any time in jail. Factors in reducing the sentence were that the amount of total loss by customers may have been less than $400 million and that the sentences of co-defendants were only two years. Warshak was released from prison on June 14, 2017, according to the Federal Prison Inmate Locator system.

== Continued company operation ==
The Warshaks' convictions and fines forced the company into bankruptcy. In December 2008, its assets were acquired from bankruptcy court for $2.75 million by investment company Pristine Bay, which is affiliated with Cincinnati developer Chuck Kubicki. Kubicki said he wanted to save the jobs of the company's 200 employees and retain a major tenant in one of his properties in suburban Cincinnati at Forest Park, Ohio. He said he would change the company name but would keep the brand. In March 2009, Hamilton County commissioners unanimously voted to give a $195,000 property tax break to the company based on projected jobs.

On June 26, 2009, the company name was changed to Vianda LLC. In a press release, the company announced plans to expand, hiring as many as 400 additional workers. On December 14, 2009, Cincinnati Business Courier reported employment of 180, revision of sales projections of 400% growth to $120 million downward to an estimated 33% growth to $40 million, management team changes, and continued customer complaints of improper billing.

Company is currently under the leadership of Cheryl Jaeger starting on January 6, 2015 and the company is now located at 11260 Cornell Park Drive, Suite 706 Cincinnati, Ohio 45242 Company is also connected to the following companies DYNAMIC DIRECT, LLC, ENHANCED LIVING PRODUCTS, LLC, MOVNNON, LLC, PRISTINE BAY, LLC, and LAST SAY, LLC.

== See also ==
- Erectile dysfunction
- ExtenZe
- Penis enlargement
- Patent medicine
