= Ghost cattle fraud =

Fraud scheme in Washington, United States

- Duration: 2016-2020
- Location: Mesa, Washington, United States
- Suspects: Cody Easterday
- Charges: One count of wire fraud
- Sentence: 11 years

The "ghost cattle" or "ghost herd" fraud was a scheme perpetrated by Cody Easterday, a rancher in Mesa, Washington, to charge Tyson Foods for more than 200,000 cattle that did not exist. From 2016 until 2020, when Tyson discovered the missing cattle, Easterday submitted invoices totalling more than $200 million.

Easterday was charged in the U.S. District Court for the Eastern District of Washington. Easterday confessed to the deception in November, 2020, and later pled guilty to one count of wire fraud. He was sentenced to 11 years in prison on October 4, 2022, and ordered to pay $244 million in restitution. The "ghost cattle" fraud was called "one of the largest thefts in Washington history" by federal prosecutors.

== Feeding agreement ==
Easterday is a third-generation rancher in eastern Washington who was the owner and president of Easterday Farms Inc. and Easterday Ranches Inc. Easterday entered into a feeding agreement with Tyson Fresh Meats in 2010. Under the terms of the agreement, Tyson would pay the costs of obtaining and caring for between 145,000 and 180,500 cattle annually, and then pay Easterday the market value of the cattle, minus the amounts already paid plus 4% interest on those amounts, when they went to slaughter. Easterday Ranches produced 2% of Tyson's cattle.

Starting in 2011, Easterday began incurring financial losses from speculative trading on cattle futures, accruing a total loss of $54.8 million by 2015. His losses in 2018 were $58.8 million. Easterday had used the corporate account for Easterday Ranches for his trades. To offset his trading losses, Easterday began billing Tyson Fresh Meats for the cost of feeding nonexistent cattle. In 2020, an internal review by Tyson discovered the deception. When confronted, Easterday told Tyson that the cattle did not exist and then assisted them with their audits.

In January, 2020, Tyson filed suit against Easterday Ranches to recoup their money. After Tyson's investigation, the company halted all payments and Easterday Ranches entered bankruptcy proceedings. The complications of the bankruptcy process led to Easterday's sentencing being delayed five times.

Because the invoices were emailed across state lines, federal prosecutors charged Easterday with wire fraud. Easterday's falsified invoices to Tyson totaled $233,008,042 and fake invoices to an unnamed company totaled $11,023,084.

== Sentencing ==
Easterday's attorneys proposed a sentence of one year house arrest and three years probation due to Easterday's standing in the community, his acceptance of responsibility, and "inability to control a gambling addiction". On October 4, 2022, U.S. District Court Judge Stanley Bastian sentenced Easterday to 11 years in prison, which he is serving at Federal Correctional Institution, Lompoc, and ordered to pay restitution of $244 million.

Additionally, commodities broker CHS Hedging was fined $6.5 million by the Commodity Futures Trading Commission for anti-money laundering failures as applied to the Easterday Ranches trading account.
