= Rosemary Altea =

Self-described healer & medium

- Born: Rosemary Edwards; Leicester, England
- Occupations: Self-described medium and healer
- Children: 1
- Website: www.rosemaryaltea.com

Rosemary Altea (born Rosemary Edwards) is a British author who describes herself as a medium and healer. She has appeared on various programs, including Larry King Live, The Oprah Winfrey Show, and featured in Unsolved Mysteries with Robert Stack, becoming one of their most watched episodes. She was a regular guest on the Leeza Gibbons Show and Maury Povich Show, and was interviewed by Roseanne Barr on the Roseanne Show. She has been featured on international prime time television shows including Prime Time Live with Diane Sawyer, 20/20, NBC Dateline, This Morning in the UK and the Maurizio Costanzo and Carlo Nesti shows in Italy. She has written seven books and was the founder of the Rosemary Altea Association of Healers.

== Early life ==
Altea was born in 1938 as Rosemary Edwards in Leicester, England to Lilian and William Edwards, and has two brothers and three sisters. Rosemary describes having had psychic visions from a young age, causing parents to threaten to commit her to a mental asylum. Her formal education ended at the age of 16 when she left school and then got married when she was 19. She has one daughter born in 1970. She divorced and fell upon financial hardship at age 35.

== Career ==
In November 1981, Rosemary describes how she had a vision at night, after which she felt open to the possibility of a spirit world. The same year, struggling to make ends meet and take care of her daughter, she began charging £3.50 per session for psychic reading and adopted the name Rosemary Altea.

On 26 January 2007, Altea appeared on Larry King Live with skeptic James Randi. When asked on the show to take the One Million Dollar Paranormal Challenge, she argued that she "[doesn't] believe there's $1 million".

== Bibliography ==
- Altea, Rosemary; Altea, Samantha Jane (2015) Angels in Training An Inspirational Guide for Everyday Life self-published through Lulu.com
- Altea, Rosemary (2007). A Matter of Life and Death: Remarkable True Stories of Hope and Healing. Jeremy P. Tarcher ISBN 978-1-58-542553-2
- Altea, Rosemary (2004). Soul Signs: An Elemental Guide to Your Spiritual Destiny. Rodale Press ISBN 978-1-57-954948-0
- Altea, Rosemary (2004). Give the Gift of Healing: A Concise Guide to Spiritual Healing. William Morrow & Company ISBN 978-0-06-073811-2
- Altea, Rosemary (2000). You Own the Power: Stories & Exercises To Inspire & Unleash The Force Within. William Morrow ISBN 978-0-68-815276-5
- Altea, Rosemary (1997). Proud Spirit: Lessons, Insights and Healing Stories. William Morrow ISBN 978-0-68-814998-7
- Altea, Rosemary (1995). The Eagle and The Rose: A Remarkable True Story. Warner Books ISBN 978-0-44-651969-4

== See also ==
- Ann O'Delia Diss Debar
- Char Margolis
- Flim-Flam! (Psychics, ESP, Unicorns and other Delusions)
- Fortune telling fraud
- Houdini's debunking of psychics and mediums
- James Van Praagh
- John Edward
- Linda and Terry Jamison
- Long Island Medium
- Mark Edward
- Matt Fraser (psychic)
- Monica the Medium
- Psychic Blues: Confessions of a Conflicted Medium
- Rose Mackenberg (Historic investigator of psychic mediums)
- Sylvia Browne
- Thomas John Flanagan
- Tyler Henry
