= Sylvia Browne =

American psychic and author (1936–2013)

- Born: Sylvia Celeste Shoemaker; October 19, 1936; Kansas City, Missouri, U.S.
- Died: November 20, 2013 (aged 77); San Jose, California, U.S.
- Occupations: Psychic, medium, author
- Spouses: Gary Dufresne (m. 1959; div. 1972) Kenzil Brown (m. 1973; div. 1988) Larry Beck (m. 1994; div. 2002) Michael Ulery (m. 2009)
- Children: 2
- Website: sylviabrowne.com

Sylvia Celeste Browne (née Shoemaker; October 19, 1936 – November 20, 2013) was an American writer and self-proclaimed medium and psychic. She appeared regularly on television and radio, including on The Montel Williams Show and Larry King Live, and hosted an hour-long online radio show on Hay House Radio.

Browne frequently made pronouncements that were later found to be false, including those related to missing persons. In 1992, she pleaded no contest to securities fraud. Despite the considerable negative publicity, she maintained a large following until her death in 2013.

== Early life ==
Sylvia Browne grew up in Kansas City, Missouri, the daughter of William Lee and Celeste (née Coil) Shoemaker. Her father held several different jobs, working at times in mail delivery, jewelry sales, and as a vice president of a freight line. Although Browne was raised mostly as a Catholic, she was said to have an Episcopalian mother, a Lutheran maternal grandmother, Jewish father, and relatives from all these faiths.

Browne said that she started seeing visions at the age of three, and that her grandmother, who she said was also a psychic medium, helped her understand what they meant. Browne also said her great-uncle was a psychic medium and was "rabid about UFOs".

== Career ==
Browne started working as a psychic in 1973. In 1986, she founded a Gnostic Christian church in Campbell, California, known as the Society of Novus Spiritus. She was also head of the Sylvia Browne Corporation and Sylvia Browne Enterprises. In a 2010 interview, Browne's business manager said that her businesses earned $3 million a year.

Browne said she observed Heaven and angels. She also professed the ability to speak with a spirit guide named Francine, and to perceive a wide range of "vibrational frequencies".

=== Books ===
Browne authored some 40 books on paranormal topics, some of which appeared on The New York Times Best Seller list. Many of these books were acknowledged as resulting from collaborations with other writers such as Lindsay Harrison and Chris Dufresne.

=== Television and radio ===
Browne was a frequent guest on American television and radio programs, including Larry King Live, The Montel Williams Show, That's Incredible!, and Coast to Coast AM. During these appearances, she usually discussed her purported abilities with the host and then performed psychic readings for audience members or callers. On certain occasions she was paired with other guests, including skeptics, often leading to debate about the authenticity of Browne's psychic abilities. Browne hosted her own hour-long online radio show on Hay House Radio, where she performed readings and discussed paranormal issues.

Browne appeared in a 1991 episode of Haunted Lives: True Ghost Stories. In the segment "Ghosts R Us", she portrayed herself in a recreation of events that purportedly took place in a haunted Toys R Us store. Browne also appeared as herself on the CBS television soap opera The Young and the Restless in December 2006.

== False predictions ==
Browne made many public pronouncements which were subsequently proven false. Among the more notable incidents were the following:

- In 2002, Browne informed the parents of 11-year-old Shawn Hornbeck, who had disappeared earlier that year, that he had been kidnapped by a dark-skinned Hispanic man with dreadlocks and was now deceased. Hornbeck was found alive in 2007; his kidnapper was Caucasian and short-haired. In June 2008, the UK television network ITV2 was sanctioned by Ofcom for re-airing the episode of The Montel Williams Show featuring Browne's original prediction.
- In November 2004, Browne told the mother of kidnapping victim Amanda Berry, who had disappeared nineteen months earlier, "She's not alive, honey." Browne also said that Berry was "in water", and that she had had a vision of Berry's jacket in the garbage with "DNA on it". Berry's mother died two years later believing her daughter had been killed. Berry was found alive in May 2013.
- On Larry King Live in 2003, Browne predicted that she would die at age 88. She died in 2013, at age 77.

=== Psychic detective cases ===
In 2000, Brill's Content examined ten recent Montel Williams episodes that highlighted Browne's work as a psychic detective, spanning 35 cases. In 21 cases, the information predicted by Browne was too vague to be verified. Of the remaining 14, law enforcement officials or family members stated Browne had played no useful role.

In 2010, the Skeptical Inquirer published a detailed three-year study by Ryan Shaffer and Agatha Jadwiszczok that examined Browne's predictions about missing persons and murder cases. Despite her repeated claims to be more than 85% correct, the study reported that "Browne has not even been mostly correct in a single case." The study compared Browne's televised statements about 115 cases with newspaper reports and found that in the 25 cases where the actual outcome was known, she was completely wrong in every one. In the rest, where the outcome was unknown, her predictions could not be substantiated. The study concluded that the media outlets that repeatedly promoted Browne's work had no visible concern about whether she was untrustworthy or harmed people.

Among the predictions examined in the study were the following:

- In 1999, Browne said that six-year-old Opal Jo Jennings, who had disappeared a month earlier, had been forced into slavery in Japan. Later that year, a local man was convicted of kidnapping and murdering Jennings. In 2003, an autopsy of Jennings' remains found that she had died within hours of her abduction.
- In 2002, Browne said that Holly Krewson, who had disappeared in 1995, was working as an exotic dancer in a Hollywood nightclub. In 2006, dental records were used to positively identify a body found in 1996 in San Diego as Krewson's.
- In 2002, Browne said that Lynda McClelland, who had disappeared in 2000, had been taken by a man with the initials "MJ", was alive in Orlando, Florida, and would be found soon. In 2003, McClelland's son-in-law David Repasky, who had been present at Browne's reading, was convicted of murdering McClelland; her remains were found near her home in Pennsylvania.
- In 2004, Browne said that Ryan Katcher, a 19-year-old who had disappeared in 2000, had been murdered, and his body could be found in a metal shaft. In 2006, Katcher's body was found in his truck at the bottom of a pond, where he had drowned.

In a 2013 follow-up article, Shaffer reviewed more recent predictions by Browne, as well as predictions whose outcomes had been earlier classified as undetermined but were now largely resolved. According to Shaffer, Browne was mostly or completely wrong in 33 cases and mostly accurate in none.

=== Sago Mine disaster ===
On January 2, 2006, an explosion at Sago mine in West Virginia trapped several miners underground. The following day, Browne was a guest on the radio program Coast to Coast AM with George Noory. At the start of the broadcast, it was believed that twelve of thirteen miners trapped by the disaster had been found alive and, when Noory asked Browne if the reported lack of noise from inside the mine might have led her to think the men had died, she replied, "No; I knew they were going to be found." Later in the program, it was discovered that the earlier news reports had been in error; Browne said, "I don't think there's anybody alive, maybe one ... I just don't think they are alive", adding, subsequently, that she "didn't believe that they were alive ... I did believe that they were gone."

== Popularity ==
Browne cultivated a large following. In 2007, she had a four-year waiting list for readings by telephone. That same year, hundreds of people joined Browne on a cruise, each paying thousands of dollars for psychic readings. Many of her books became staples on The New York Times Best Seller list.

Browne attracted media attention seven years after her death, when social media users claimed that a prediction in her books (End of Days and Prophecy: What the Future Holds For You) referred to the COVID-19 pandemic (she claimed "a severe pneumonia-like illness" would spread "around" 2020). News coverage of the alleged similarity appeared in March 2020, and was picked up by celebrities with large social media platforms such as Kim Kardashian. Investigator Benjamin Radford and others dismissed the one-paragraph prediction as too generic, and actually more akin to the 2003 SARS epidemic, than to COVID-19. Radford said that as Browne had produced predictions by the thousands, "the fact that this one happened to possibly, maybe, be partly right is meaningless.”

== Criticism ==
Browne was frequently condemned by skeptics. Robert S. Lancaster maintained an exhaustive record of her inaccurate predictions and criminal activity, and described her pronouncements relating to missing children as "incredibly offensive". Jon Ronson, who called Browne "America's most controversial psychic", wrote that she was often "psychically wrong" and made "a fortune saying very serious, cruel, show-stopping things to people in distress". Fox News noted that she was "often criticized for her predictions"; Browne also garnered disapproval from others who claimed to be psychics.

=== James Randi ===
Browne's most vocal critic within the skeptical movement was James Randi, a retired stage magician and investigator of paranormal claims; Randi claimed that Browne's accuracy rate was no better than educated guessing. On September 3, 2001, Browne stated on Larry King Live that she would prove her legitimacy by accepting the James Randi Educational Foundation's One Million Dollar Paranormal Challenge to demonstrate supernatural abilities in a controlled scientific test. By April 2003, however, Browne had not contacted Randi to make testing arrangements.

On May 16, 2003, in another appearance on King's show, Browne said she had not taken the test because Randi refused to place the prize money in escrow. Randi responded by mailing a notarized copy of the prize account status showing a balance in excess of one million dollars; Browne refused to accept the letter. In late 2003, despite challenge rules that money could not be placed in escrow, Randi announced that he was willing to do so for Browne; she did not accept or acknowledge this offer. In 2005, Browne posted a message online that she had never received confirmation of the prize money's existence, despite Randi's claim that he had a certified mail receipt showing Browne's refusal of the package. In 2007, on CNN's Anderson Cooper 360°, Browne's business manager Linda Rossi stated that Browne would not be taking Randi's challenge "because she has nothing to prove to James Randi".

=== John Oliver ===
In a 2019 segment of HBO's Last Week Tonight, John Oliver criticized the media for promoting Browne and other psychics and enabling them to prey on grieving families. Oliver said, "When psychic abilities are presented as authentic, it emboldens a vast underworld of unscrupulous vultures, more than happy to make money by offering an open line to the afterlife, as well as many other bullshit services."

== Fraud conviction ==
During the late 1980s, the FBI and local authorities began investigating Browne and her businesses over several bank loans that resulted in "sustained losses" to banks. In 1992, Browne and her then-husband Kenzil Dalzell Brown were indicted on several counts of investment fraud and grand theft. The Superior Court of Santa Clara County, California found that the couple had sold securities in a gold-mining venture under false pretenses. In one instance, they told a couple that their $20,000 investment would be used for immediate operating costs. Instead, the funds were transferred to an account for their Nirvana Foundation for Psychic Research.

Browne ultimately pleaded no contest to securities fraud and was indicted on grand larceny in Santa Clara County on May 26, 1992. She and her husband each received one year of probation, and Browne was also sentenced to 200 hours of community service.

== Personal life ==
Browne married four times. Her first marriage, from 1959 to 1972, was to Gary Dufresne. The couple had two sons, Paul and Christopher. She took the surname Brown upon her third marriage and later changed it to Browne. Her fourth marriage took place on February 14, 2009, to Michael Ulery, the owner of a jewelry store.

In March 2011, the Society of Novus Spiritus, the Gnostic Christian church founded by Browne, announced that she had suffered a heart attack on March 21 while in Hawaii, and requested donations on her behalf.

Browne died on November 20, 2013, aged 77, at Good Samaritan Hospital in San Jose, California. She was interred at Oak Hill Memorial Park.

== Publications ==
- 1990: (with Antoinette May). Adventures of a Psychic. Carlsbad, CA: Hay House. ISBN 978-0-7394-0178-1
- 1999: (with Lindsay Harrison). The Other Side and Back: A Psychic's Guide to Our World and Beyond. New York, NY: Signet. ISBN 978-0-451-19863-1
- 2000: (with Lindsay Harrison). Life on the Other Side: A Psychic's Tour of the Afterlife. New York, NY: Dutton. ISBN 978-0-525-94539-0
- 2000: God, Creation, and Tools for Life. Carlsbad, CA: Hay House. ISBN 978-1-56170-722-5
- 2000: Astrology Through a Psychic's Eyes. Carlsbad, CA: Hay House. ISBN 978-1-56170-720-1
- 2000: Meditations. Carlsbad, CA: Hay House. ISBN 978-1-56170-719-5
- 2000: (with Lindsay Harrison). Blessings from the Other Side. New York, NY: New American Library. ISBN 978-0-525-94574-1
- 2000: Soul's Perfection. Carlsbad, CA: Hay House. ISBN 978-1-56170-723-2
- 2001: (with Lindsay Harrison). Past Lives, Future Healing. New York, NY: New American Library. ISBN 978-0-451-20597-1
- 2001: The Nature of Good and Evil. Carlsbad, CA: Hay House. ISBN 978-1-56170-724-9
- 2002: Prayers. Carlsbad, CA: Hay House. ISBN 978-1-56170-902-1
- 2002: Conversations with the Other Side. Carlsbad, CA: Hay House. ISBN 978-1-56170-718-8
- 2003: (with Lindsay Harrison). Visits from the Afterlife. New York, NY: New American Library. ISBN 978-0-525-94756-1
- 2003: (with Lindsay Harrison). Book of Dreams. New York, NY: Signet. ISBN 978-0-451-20828-6
- 2003: Book of Angels. Carlsbad, CA: Hay House. ISBN 978-1-4019-0193-6
- 2004: Mother God: The Feminine Principle to Our Creator. Carlsbad, CA: Hay House. ISBN 978-1-4019-0309-1
- 2004: Lessons for Life. Carlsbad, CA: Hay House. ISBN 978-1-4019-0087-8
- 2004: (with Lindsay Harrison). Prophecy: What the Future Holds for You. New York, NY: Dutton. ISBN 978-0-525-94822-3
- 2005: Contacting Your Spirit Guide. Carlsbad, CA: Hay House. ISBN 978-1-4019-0532-3
- 2005: Secrets & Mysteries of the World. Carlsbad, CA: Hay House. ISBN 978-1-4019-0458-6
- 2005: Phenomenon: Everything You Need to Know About the Paranormal. New York, NY: Dutton. ISBN 978-0-525-94911-4
- 2005: (with Chris Dufresne). Animals on the Other Side. Cincinnati, OH: Angel Bea Publishing. ISBN 978-0-9717843-4-5
- 2006: If You Could See What I See: The Tenets of Novus Spiritus. Carlsbad, CA: Hay House. ISBN 978-1-4019-0648-1
- 2006: Exploring the Levels of Creation. Carlsbad, CA: Hay House. ISBN 978-1-4019-0891-1
- 2006: Insight: Case Files from the Psychic World. New York, NY: Dutton. ISBN 978-0-525-94955-8
- 2006: The Mystical Life of Jesus. New York, NY: Dutton. ISBN 978-0-525-95001-1
- 2006: Light a Candle. Cincinnati, OH: Angel Bea Publishing. ISBN 978-0-9717843-6-9
- 2006: (with Chris Dufresne). Christmas in Heaven. Cincinnati, OH: Angel Bea Publishing. ISBN 978-0-9777790-0-0
- 2007: Father God. Carlsbad, CA: Hay House. ISBN 978-1-4019-0533-0
- 2007: Spiritual Connections. Carlsbad, CA: Hay House. ISBN 978-1-4019-0881-2
- 2007: (with Lindsay Harrison). Psychic Children. New York, NY: Dutton. ISBN 978-0-525-95013-4
- 2007: Secret Societies. Carlsbad, CA: Hay House. ISBN 978-1-4019-1675-6
- 2007: (with Chris Dufresne). Spirit of Animals. Cincinnati, OH: Angel Bea Publishing. ISBN 978-0-9777790-1-7
- 2007: The Two Marys. New York, NY: Dutton. ISBN 978-0-525-95043-1
- 2008: Temples on the Other Side. Carlsbad, CA: Hay House. ISBN 978-1-4019-1745-6
- 2008: (with Lindsay Harrison). End of Days. New York, NY: Dutton. ISBN 978-0-525-95067-7
- 2008: Mystical Traveler. Carlsbad, CA: Hay House. ISBN 978-1-4019-1861-3
- 2009: All Pets Go to Heaven: The Spiritual Lives of the Animals We Love. New York, NY: Touchstone. ISBN 978-1-4165-9125-2
- 2009: Psychic Healing: Using the Tools of a Medium to Cure Whatever Ails You. Carlsbad, CA: Hay House. ISBN 978-1-4019-1088-4
- 2009: Messages from Spirit: An Open-at-Random Book of Guidance. Pittsburgh, PA: St. Lynn's Press. ISBN 978-0-9800288-6-7
- 2009: Accepting the Psychic Torch. Carlsbad, CA: Hay House. ISBN 978-1-4019-2042-5
- 2009: (with Lindsay Harrison). The Truth About Psychics: What's Real, What's Not, and How to Tell the Difference. New York, NY: Touchstone. ISBN 978-1-4391-4972-0
- 2010: Psychic: My Life in Two Worlds. New York, NY: HarperOne. ISBN 978-0-06-196672-9
- 2011: Afterlives of the Rich and Famous. New York, NY: HarperOne. ISBN 978-0-06-196679-8

== See also ==
- Ann O'Delia Diss Debar ("One of the most extraordinary fake mediums... the world has ever known" - Houdini)
- Char Margolis
- Flim-Flam! (Psychics, ESP, Unicorns and other Delusions)
- Fortune telling fraud
- Houdini's debunking of psychics and mediums
- James Van Praagh
- John Edward
- Linda and Terry Jamison
- Mark Edward
- Matt Fraser (psychic)
- Monica the Medium
- Televangelist Peter Popoff exposed by James Randi
- Psychic Blues: Confessions of a Conflicted Medium
- Psychic Friends Network, telephone psychic service
- Rose Mackenberg (Historic investigator of psychic mediums)
- Thomas John Flanagan
- Tyler Henry
