= Mark Edward =

American magician, author, and skeptic (1951–2024)

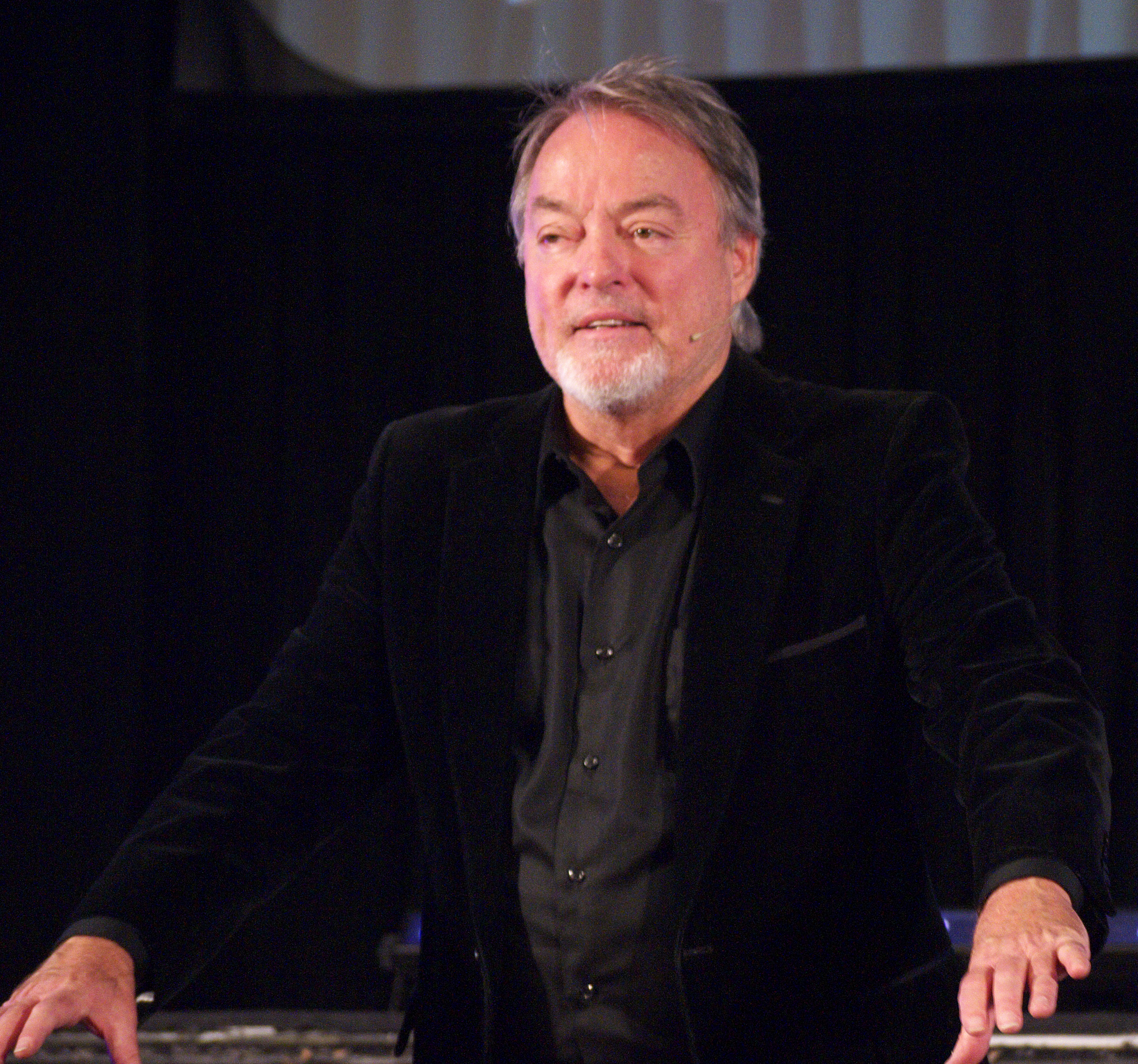
- Edward in 2014
- Born: Mark Edward Wilson; May 19, 1951; Los Angeles, California, U.S.
- Died: August 4, 2024 (aged 73)
- Education: Bachelor of Fine Arts 1974
- Alma mater: California Institute of the Arts
- Occupations: Mentalist; magician; writer; skeptic; psychic entertainer
- Mark Edward's voice recorded in January 2014
- Website: themarkedward.com

Mark Edward (born Mark Edward Wilson, May 19, 1951 – August 4, 2024) was an American mentalist and author. He wrote books on mentalism and séance theory and production, including Psychic Blues (2009), where he discussed working for the Psychic Friends Network. Wilson made appearances on television as both primary consultant and on-air performer in programming such as ABC's The Con, A & E's Biography: "Houdini, the Great Escape", NBC's The Other Side, and Psychic Secrets Revealed, the Sci-Fi Channel's Mysteries, Magic and Miracles, Disney's Forces Beyond, as well as two episodes of the Learning Channel's Exploring the Unknown. His featured segment as a spirit medium on the pilot episode of Showtime's Penn & Teller's Bullshit! series, titled "Speaking with the Dead", helped secure an Emmy Award nomination for that episode in 2002. He coined the term "grief vampire" as a description of alleged psychic mediums who prey on vulnerable people. Edward was a fellow with the Committee for Skeptical Inquiry.

== Early life ==
Edward became interested in magic through his maternal grandfather George Schaeffer, who was a card player and amateur magician. Edward became his test subject for many close-up magic routines. By 11 he was performing magic shows for school, friends and family events.

From the ages of 14 to 18, Edward was involved in music in various Dada and performance art bands in and around South Los Angeles, including "ZaSu Pitts and the Enema Dog Review – Featuring a Walk in the Closet", "Rat Salad" and "The Techno-Cats" (which later splintered into The Brainiacs, The Suburbs and Suburban Lawns). During a punk concert at LA's "Brave Dog" club where he was performing in the power trio Steak Sinatra, he was hit in the head with a half-full beer bottle at which point he decided to pursue a solo career in magic.

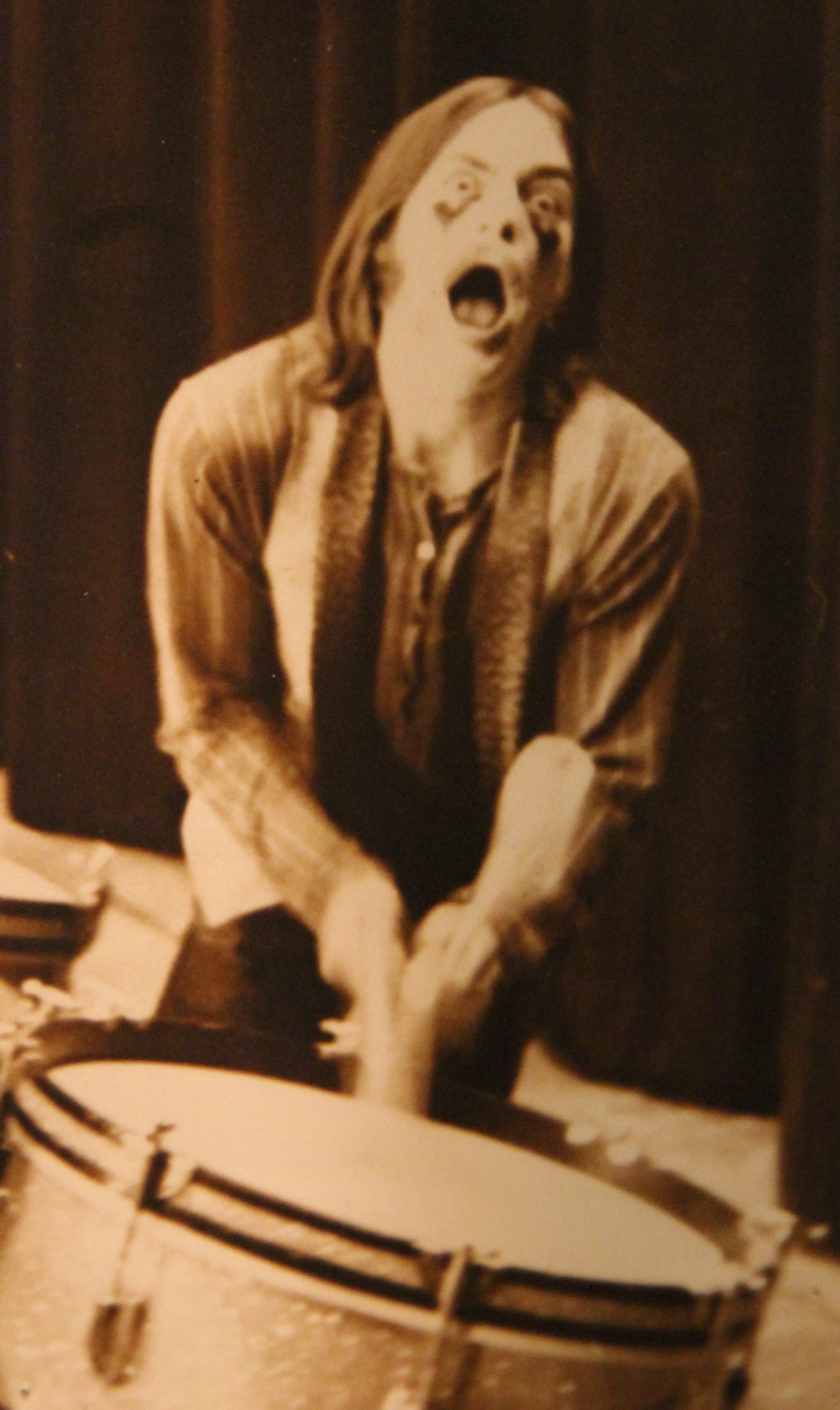
"ZaSu Pitts and the Enema Dog Review" 1968

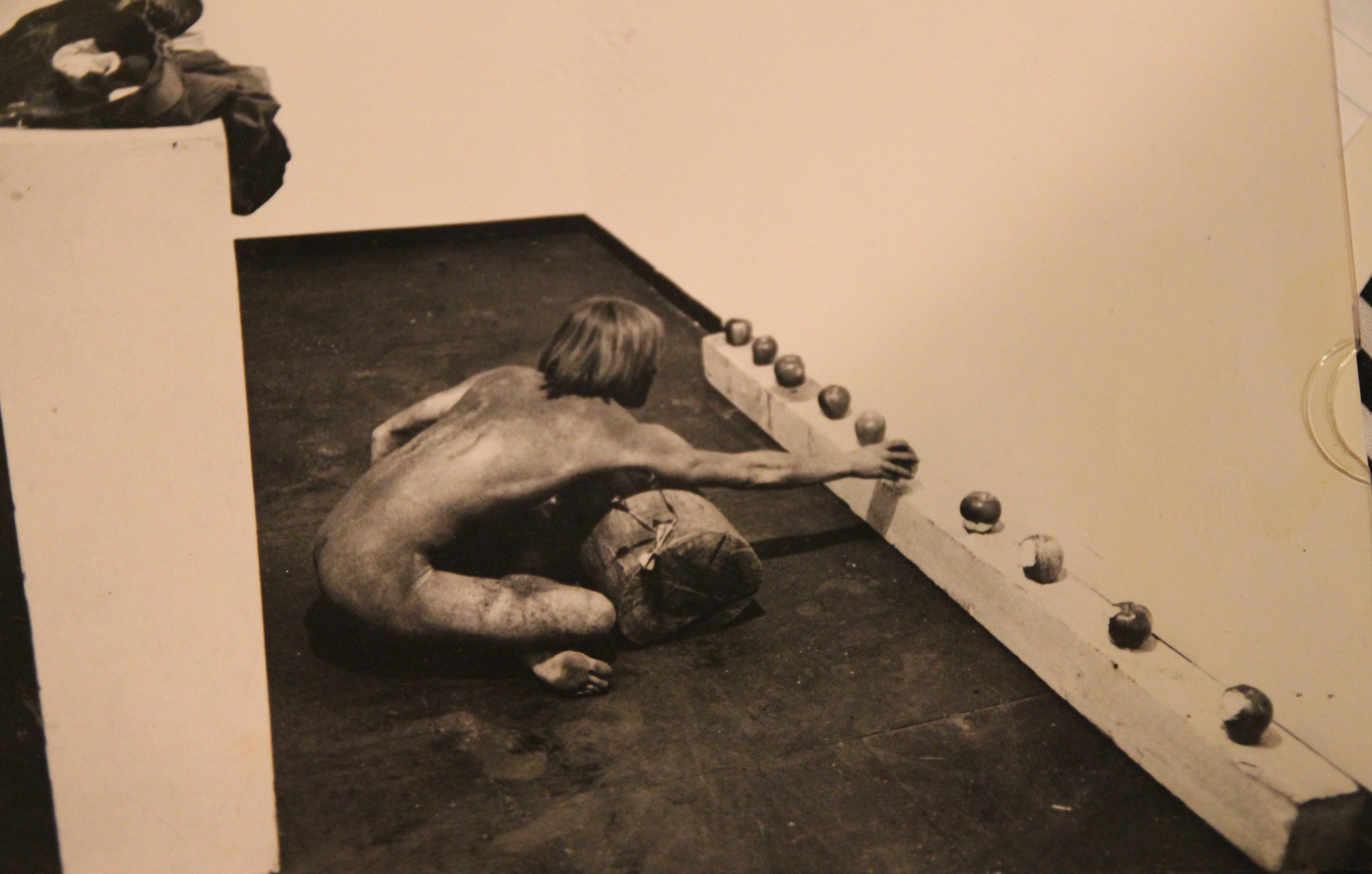
"Ashes and Apples"

During this time, Edward was also studying post-studio, performance and conceptual art with mentor John Baldessari at CalArts. Baldessari greatly influenced his later work in magic and mentalism. These influences led to performances of juggling, fire-eating and magic in public places such as local laundromats and DMV waiting areas.

Finding he was near starvation as an artist and realizing he could return to his magic roots and make money, in 1974, Edward formed a street magic group with several other CalArts performance and theater arts majors. After working several years as a street magician at Magic Mountain and in sales at Hollywood Magic Company, he decided it was time to audition as a performing member of Hollywood's Magic Castle.

In 1975, when Edward became a performer at the Castle, famed magician of television's "Magic Land of Alakazam" Mark Wilson was on the Board of Directors. The younger Mark Wilson was advised if he wanted to perform he needed to change his name, which he did, deciding to use his middle name as his last name.

Bored with standard magic, Edward decided to pursue his interest in psychic and educated animal acts, studying under Ralph Helfer and later Ray Berwick at Universal Studios's Animal Actors Stage. This training led to his later performances with "Jim, Emperor of All Dogs" in a levitating dog act. According to the "Los Angeles Parkside Journal" Edward is quoted as saying, "My favorite kind of act is 'mental' magic".

In 1985 Edward took the job of Associate Resident Medium at the Magic Castle in The Houdini Séance Room. As his séance work progressed he became more involved with the skeptical movement. In 1991 he met Michael Shermer and began giving lectures on psychic matters to the Skeptics Society. The next year he accepted a position on the Editorial Board of Skeptic magazine. In 1998 he became a member of the Psychic Entertainers Association. He left the Magic Castle in 1999, after 25 years, 14 of which were spent in The Houdini Séance Room.

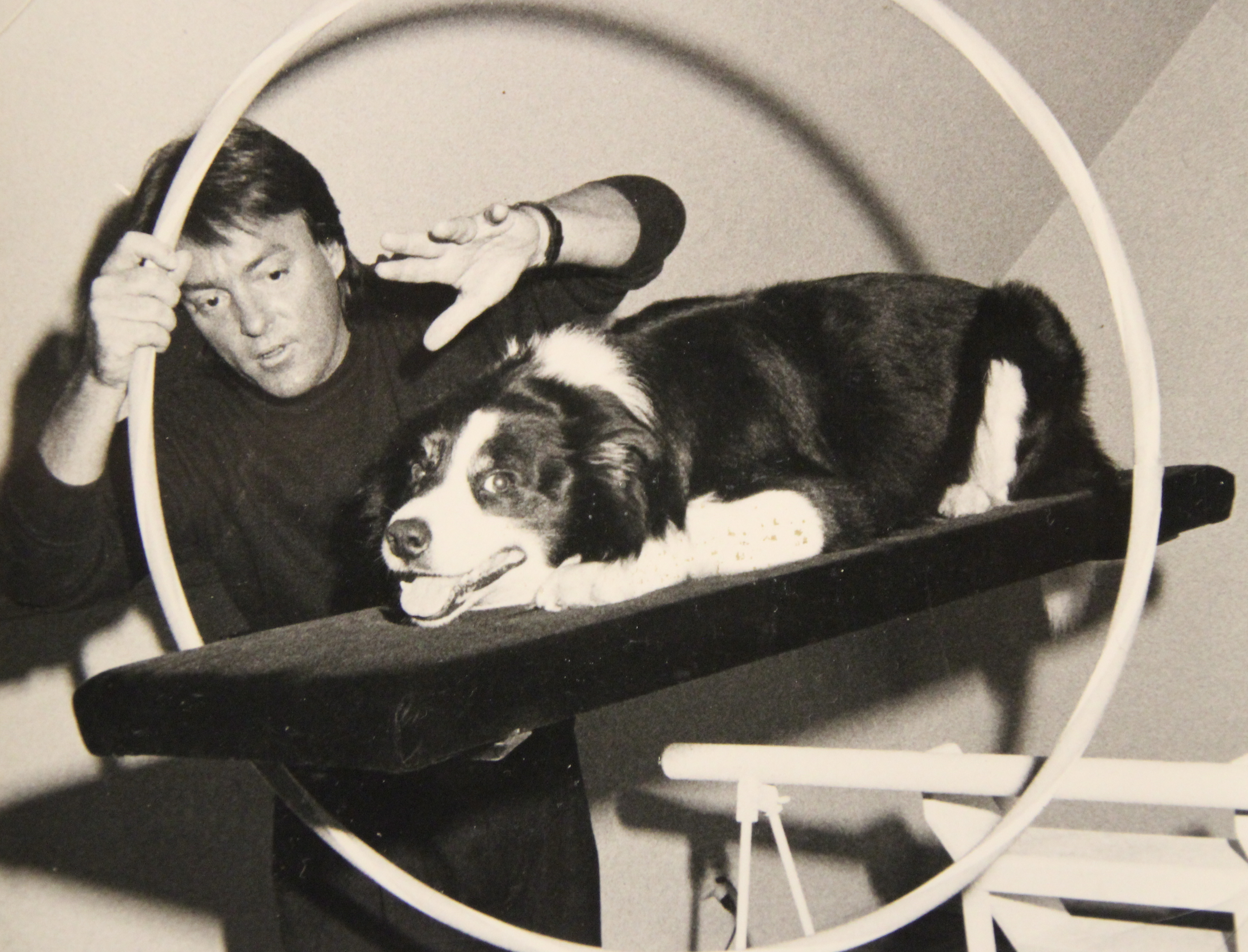
Jim – Emperor of all Dogs

== Years as a "professional psychic" ==
In 1990, Edward began working for the Psychic Friends Network. Highly influenced by 1930 movies about mediums and psychic scams and later the 1948 film Nightmare Alley, Edward decided to climb as high as he could in the growing psychic/New Age market. Magician Penn Jillette referred to Edward as a "reformed con artist" on the pilot of their Showtime television series Bullshit!, a label that Edward rejects. "I've always been a skeptic because I'm a magician. When I see something in this hand [pointing to his right hand], I automatically want to know what the other hand is doing".

During this time, Edward also worked on radio talk shows in Hollywood and Hawaii, gaining notoriety that eventually led to being chosen out of 160 other psychics to be second in line and backup Master Psychic for the ill-fated Psychic Friends Radio Network. Finally, he did a late night psychic infomercial for the Psychic Revival Network. This caused much controversy which angered magicians and skeptics alike.

In an interview with ABC's Good Morning America, Edward recounts his years as a professional psychic working the 900 phone lines. Reporter Eric Noll quotes Edward, "The psychic business is built on lies. There is no supernatural power. You can't see the future... we're in the golden age of the con. There are people coming out of the woodwork that would love to separate you from your money. But people just want someone to talk to. That's the bottom line."

== Skepticism ==
Edward's involvement in the skeptical movement has been extensive. In an interview with Skeptical Inquirer, he stated his skeptical history goes back to the 1970s, when he became involved with searching out the methods of Uri Geller. Years after working for the Psychic Friends Network, Edward decided to blow the whistle on the $2 billion a year industry. He said the industry soars when the economy tanks. People have moved, changed jobs, and even divorced after receiving a consultation, but psychics have no special abilities. They use specific techniques designed to be vague, flattering, and drawn out. They use generalities that are true about everybody. Psychics at the 900 hotlines were trained to scam callers out of their money. They were told to keep people on the line as long as possible, and to ask for their birthdays, names and addresses. Then the hotlines would start spamming people. The callers would get letters telling them they're in danger and that they need to call their psychic friend immediately. Another trend involved seeing a psychic over Skype, whereby the customer paid in advance by credit card for the psychic session, upon which the ‘psychic' on the other end would not only receive the money but was able to see the payer's itemized credit card history. Then the psychic had information on the sitter and would seem even more credible.

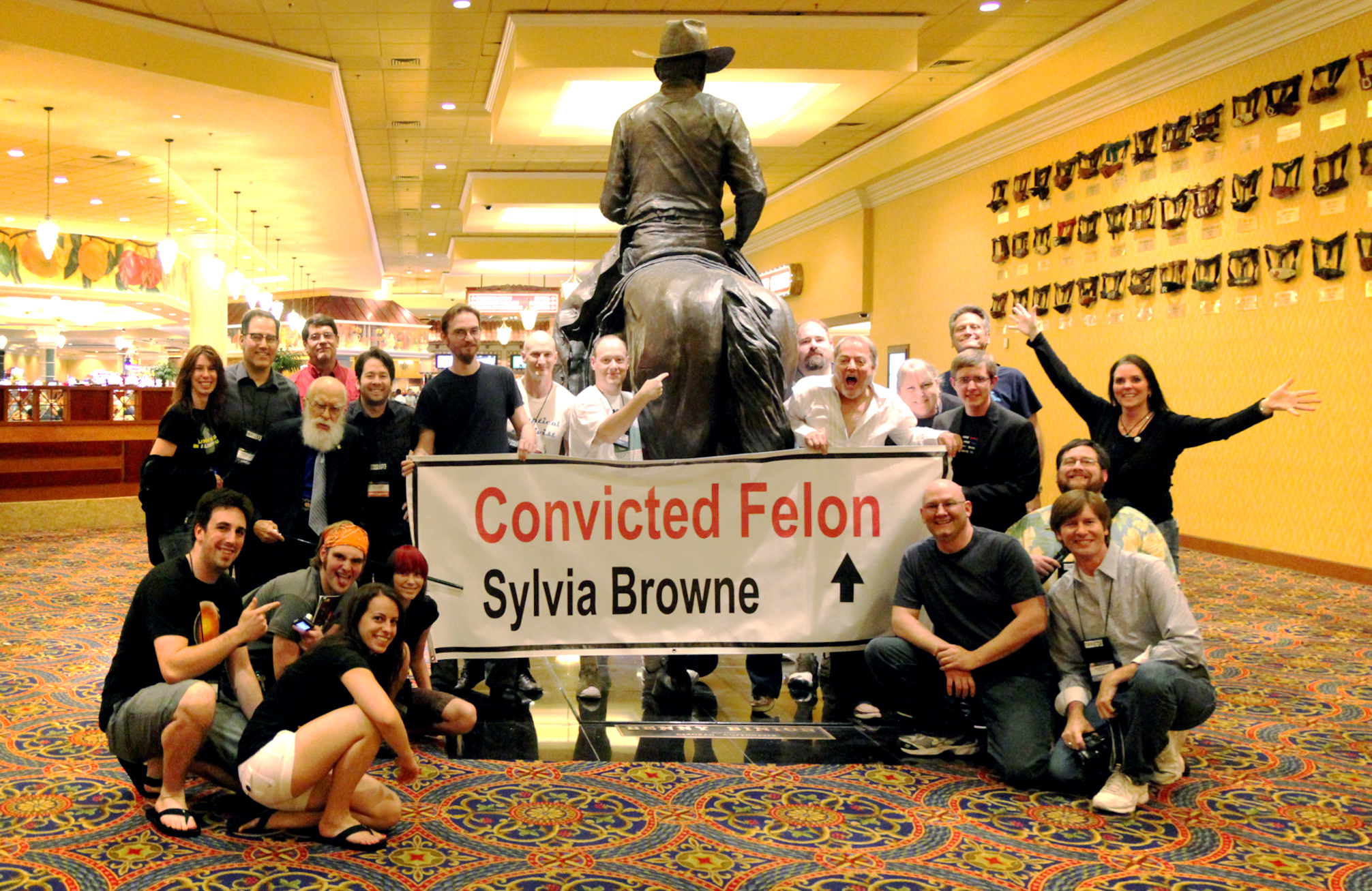
A protest against Sylvia Browne led by Edward

Edward has been very public about exposing celebrity psychics and the techniques they use to fool their audiences. On the premiere episode of Penn & Teller: Bullshit!, he demonstrated how television psychics, John Edward, James Van Praagh, and Rosemary Altea, convinced their subjects that they were actually communicating with the dead. On Inside Edition, he showed how Theresa Caputo used similar techniques to give the appearance that she can contact the deceased. He also appeared in the Halloween 2017 episode of Adam Ruins Everything with Adam Conover, in which he explained cold reading. Often, what is perceived as psychic powers, is nothing more than a simple magic trick, as in Uri Geller's famous spoon bending trick. Edward performed one of several possible techniques in the TV series, Weird or What?

Edward pointed out that if communication with the dead was possible, psychic hotlines and celebrity psychics would be obsolete, and the scientific community would give this type of phenomena a great deal of attention; however, sufficient evidence is lacking. "What is more likely" Edward asks, "that somebody can talk to dead people, or they're just conning you?" He made a similar argument for haunted houses. If we could prove ghosts were real, it would be the greatest scientific achievement in history, and we wouldn't be paying twenty dollars for a Hollywood ghost tour.

Despite his efforts to expose psychics as frauds, Edward found that some people's beliefs cannot be changed. Even though he was introduced as a fake on the Jeff Probst Show, one of the audience members requested a reading from him. On the TV series Brain Games, Edward demonstrated that the planchette on the Ouija board is controlled by the live participants and not by someone who has passed, and yet some of his sitters were convinced they had received messages from beyond the grave.

Edward said that he was always a skeptic. At the same time he was working the 900 numbers, he was also on the editorial board of Skeptic Magazine. He was a member of the team for the network television pilot The Skeptologists, working with Yau-Man Chan, Steven Novella, Phil Plait, Kirsten Sanford, Michael Shermer and Brian Dunning. The program never aired.

Edward was a steering member of IIG West, a group aimed at investigating paranormal claims. He has also worked with Investigation Network, teaching workshops and exposing psychic frauds, like Sylvia Browne and John Edward.

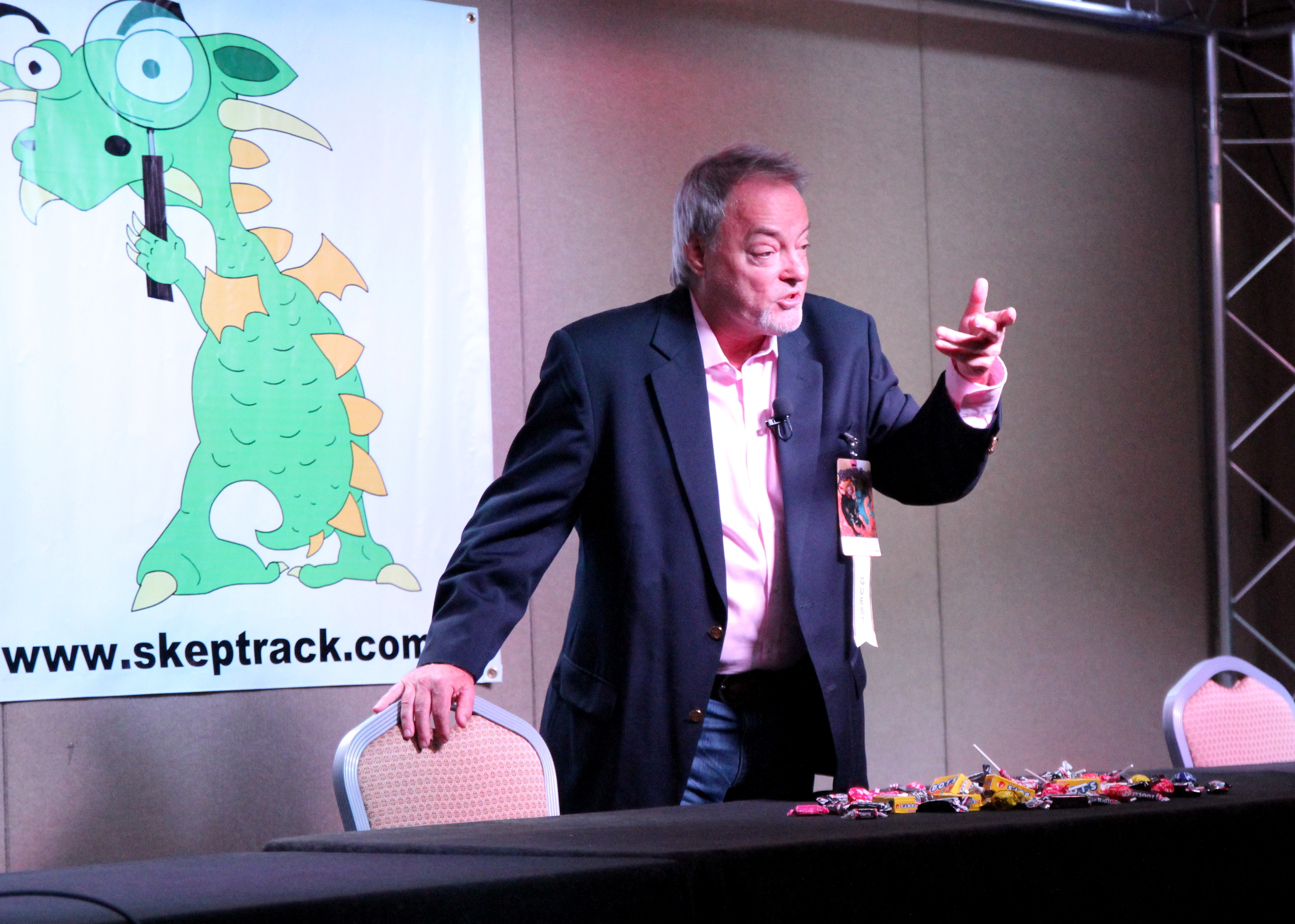
Lecture at Skeptrack at Dragon Con September 2012

Edward has been a speaker at a number of skeptical conferences. At Dragon*Con 2012 Skeptrack, he performed psychic readings and demonstrated techniques celebrity psychics use, like hot and cold readings, in front of an audience packed with skeptics. In his talk entitled Psychic Readings for Fun and Prophet, Edward explained that no one can actually read minds or talk to the dead, but that people can be fooled and that they can fool themselves, and he offered a variety of explanations.

At QEDcon 2014 his talk was entitled Psychic Blues: Using Guerrilla Skepticism To Fight Psychic Fraud. He told the audience that he was sick and tired of psychic fraud and encouraged them to join his movement and help make a difference. He showed a video of how he and a group of skeptics demonstrated at a Sylvia Browne show, and then he outlined a plan describing how audience members could organize a similar local protest. At the same conference, he sat on a panel about magic and skepticism, along with Paul Zenon, Richard Wiseman, and Deborah Hyde.

In November/December 2019, Edward attended the NZ Skeptics Conference at the Christchurch Arts Centre, New Zealand, along with Susan Gerbic. He spoke on the topic of 'When does ‘Psychic Entertainment' stop being entertaining?'.

As of 2022, Edward was a fellow with the Committee for Skeptical Inquiry.

=== The Con ===
In March 2021, Edward participated in episode 6 of season 1 of the ABC TV series The Con, "The Psychic Con", and was introduced as "The Expert" in matters of psychic deception. The show told the stories of three women who became emotionally dependent on their psychic and were defrauded out of tens of thousands of dollars, but then sought the help of psychic fraud private investigator Bob Nygaard to obtain justice.

=== Operation Pizza Roll ===
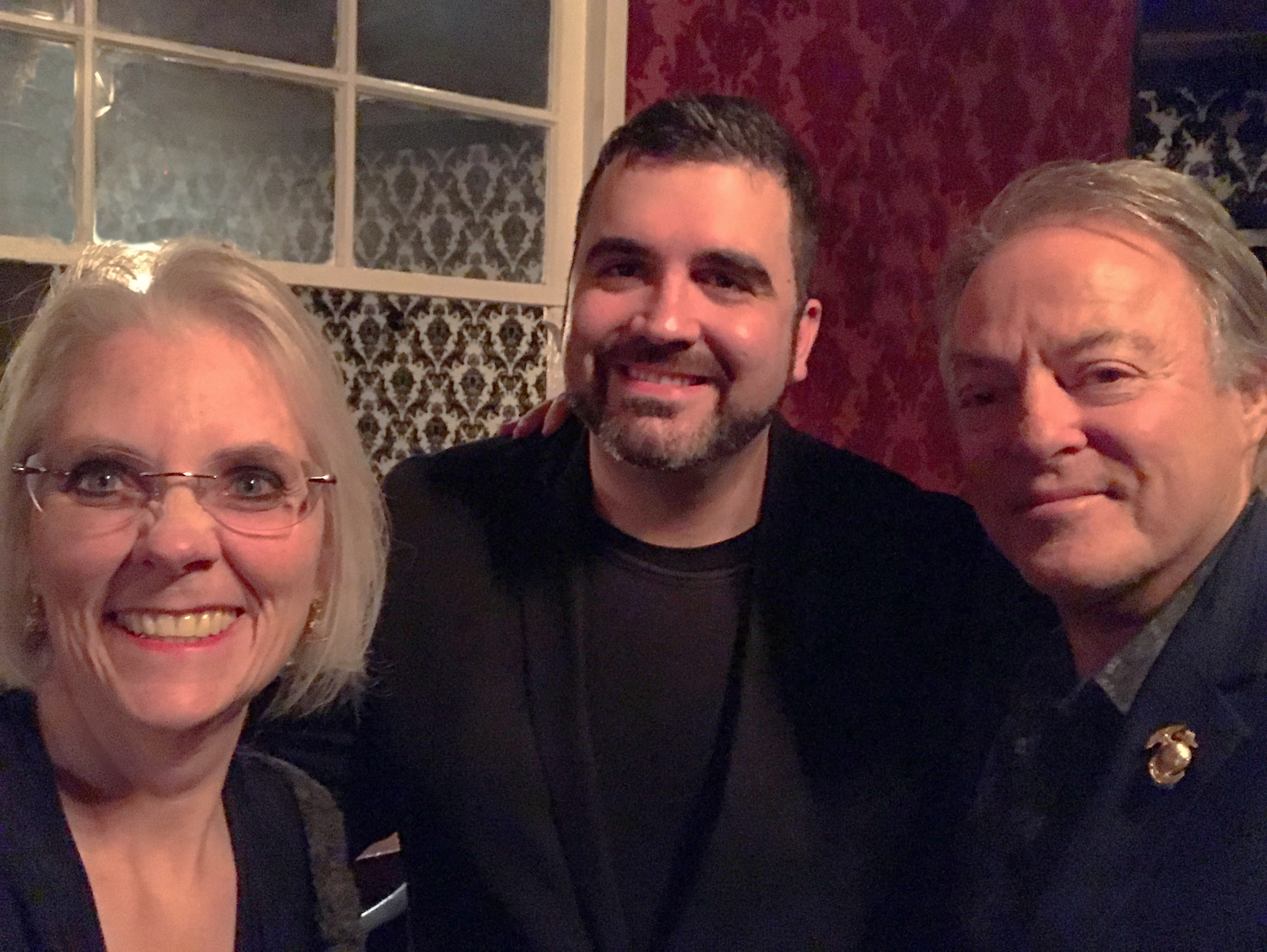
"Susanna Wilson" (Susan Gerbic) and "Mark Wilson" (Edward) undercover, with unsuspecting Thomas John (center) after their 2017 reading

In March 2017, TV medium Thomas John was caught doing a hot reading in a sting operation named "Operation Pizza Roll", which was planned and implemented by Susan Gerbic and Edward. The unmarried couple, Gerbic and Edward, attended John's show using aliases, and were "read" as a married couple Susanna and Mark Wilson by John. During the entire reading, John failed to determine the actual identities of Gerbic and Edward, or that they were being deceptive during his reading. All personal information he gave them matched what was on their falsified Facebook accounts, rather than being about their actual lives, and John pretended he was getting this information from Gerbic and Edward's supposedly dead—but actually nonexistent—relatives.

As Jack Hitt reported in The New York Times:

"Over the course of the reading, John comfortably laid down the specifics of Susanna Wilson's life—he named "Andy" and amazingly knew him to be her twin. He knew that she and her brother grew up in Michigan and that his girlfriend was Maria. He knew about Susanna's father-in-law and how he died."

These details were from the falsified Facebook accounts for the pair which were prepared by a group of skeptics in advance of the reading, and Gerbic and Edward were not aware of the specific information in these accounts. This blinding was done in order to avoid John later being able to claim he obtained the false information by reading Gerbic and Edward's minds. In her report, Gerbic also revealed that during an after-show private event, John disclosed in a group setting that at least one of the people in the audience which he did a reading about was actually his own student.

When Hitt reached out to John for comment, John insisted that he did not use Facebook, saying "I do remember her [Gerbic] coming to an event... I recognized her because she was there with that other guy who wrote that book." He also told Hitt that "I have my eyes closed for an hour and a half when I'm doing readings. If she spoke up during that period of time, I don't remember that." John also argued that the entire experiment was not really scientific enough, saying "For Susan to come to a reading and get a two-minute reading and say, well, 'I made a fake post about my dog, Buddy, and my father who died,' it's really not any sort of scientific testing of psychic powers." Ignoring Edward's participation in the sting, John added, "First off, someone will have to be a scientist to do a scientific experiment, not someone who used to be a photographer at Sears."

== Criticism ==
In his book, Psychic Blues: Confessions of a Conflicted Medium, which includes details of his time working for the Psychic Friends Network, Edward describes himself as walking both sides of the line. "My magician friends—many of them skeptics—thought I was selling out to the psychics, and the psychics thought I was selling out to the skeptics." Many skeptics, who are magicians and mediums, consider themselves not only uniquely qualified, but also obligated to teach the public that psychics are fake. They consider it a moral duty to inform their audience that they are performing tricks and not using supernatural powers. Edward used his expertise as a mentalist to expose the charlatans as frauds, but prefers not to use disclaimers, defending his work as a psychic as pure entertainment. "It's as if he believes he can deceive people and enlighten them at the same time." Edward stated in his book that using a disclaimer is like ordering a dinner at a fancy French restaurant and, just when the waiter is about to serve the meal, the chef comes out and says it came out of a can. His critics would argue that the problem is not that the appreciation for the meal was ruined; the problem is that the customer paid a premium price for canned food.

At The Amaz!ng Meeting 2013, he participated on a panel discussion entitled Magicians vs. Psychics. With him on the panel were Ray Hyman, Jamy Ian Swiss, James Randi, Max Maven, and Banachek, moderated by D.J. Grothe. Swiss criticized Edward, referring to the statement on his website: "Mark neither declares himself as a genuine psychic nor gives any disclaimers, preferring to let his work stand on its own merit and allow each individual to arrive at their own personal conclusions." Swiss called him a "lower case skeptic" and said that he did not consider him to be an ally in the skeptical movement. "Upper case Skeptics are not just concerned with what you as an individual sees about the world, but are concerned with educating others and improving others' lot in the world." In his defense, Edward pointed out that his website has skepticism written all over it, and that anybody who knows him knows that his work is valuable in the skeptical movement.

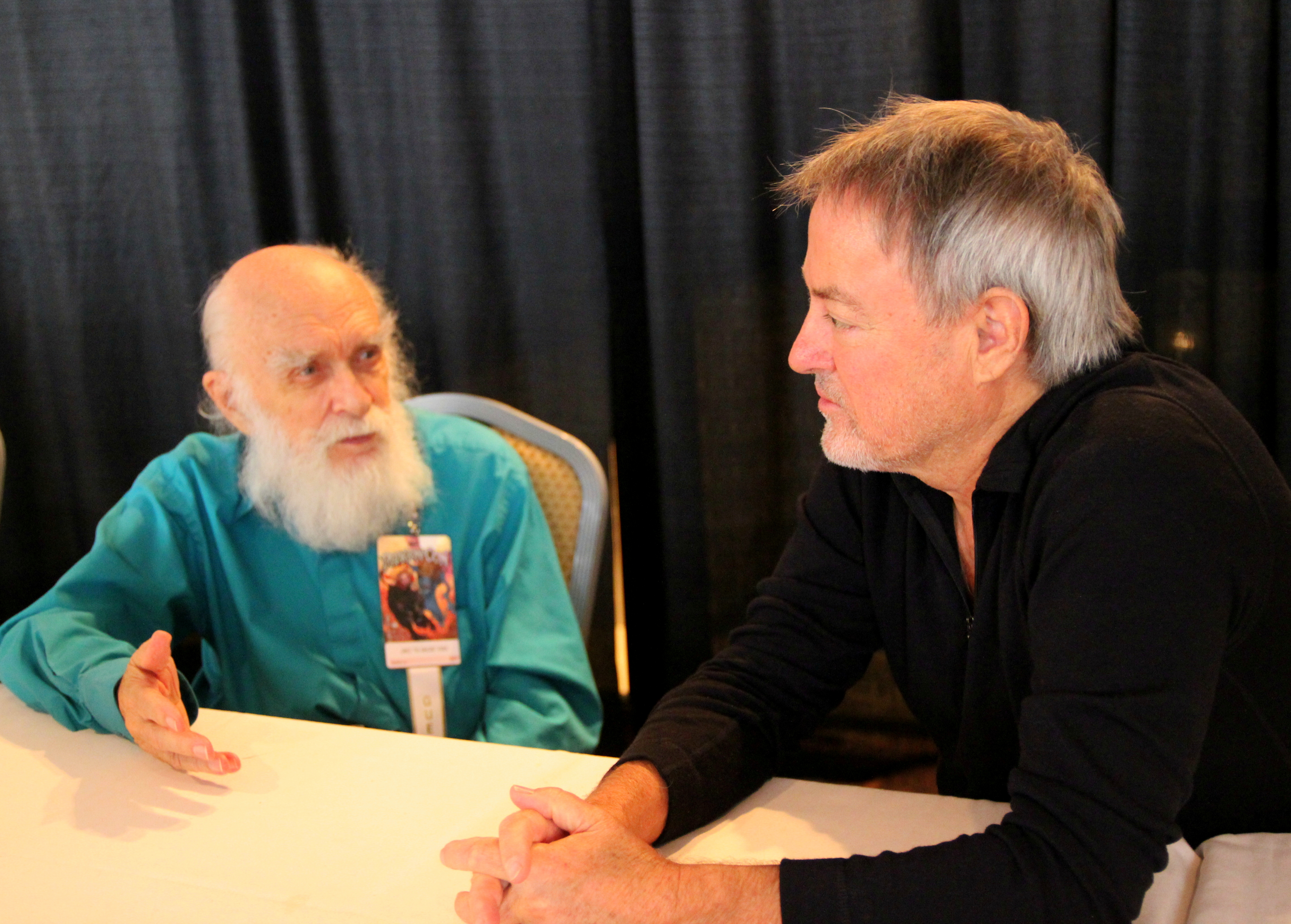
James Randi and Edward at Dragon Con 2012

Whereas most magicians and mentalists openly claim that they have no psychic ability, many psychic entertainers assume that no real disclaimer is required. Ray Hyman used the term "invited inference", meaning "you present as the real thing" without claiming outright to be psychic. "A disclaimer is a declaration that 'disclaims' that any supernatural agencies or occult forces are in any way involved, and that everything is being done through purely natural means, including trickery." James Randi and Edward discussed the importance of disclaimers in mentalism. One that would satisfy both believers and skeptics, would be to say, "I use my five senses to create the illusion of a sixth sense." Randi said that he always uses disclaimers. Edward said he has used different kinds of disclaimers, including one that he calls a "double bind." It's a disclaimer that doesn't. The idea is to vehemently deny having psychic powers to a point that the audience wonders what he's up to. He said that what sets him apart from other skeptics, is that he likes to have a little mystery.

== Artwork ==
Edward's work has been displayed at local art shows in the Los Angeles area. Create:Fixate is a quarterly one night art exhibit featuring a signature blend of over forty emerging artists, designers, DJs and musicians. Edward's piece was displayed on February 15, 2014 for the "I Art You" exhibit. On May 18, 2013 Edward held a "Soothsayer" exhibition at the Fold Gallery where he displayed his art and performed illusions and psychic readings. At the La Luz De Jesus Gallery, throughout the month of March, 2013, his Death Ray and Nebulizer and Charger were on display at the "Laluzapalooza" show. For the Dia De Los Muertos "Sacred Memories" show on October 21 through November 18, 2012, Edward had two pieces, Memories and Final Seance, on display at the Pico House Gallery.

Edward's art collection includes paintings, collages, and elaborate sculptures, using vintage laboratory glassware, metals and mixed media. His creations involve science and mysticism, and consist of mysterious mechanical devices and imaginary alchemy laboratories. His work was inspired by art movements such as Dada and surrealism, which were pioneered by artists like Max Ernst. He also designed a set of tarot cards to accompany his book, Silentium.

== Death ==
Edward died on August 4, 2024, at the age of 73 from prostate cancer.

== Books ==
Year	Title
1997	Restless Plots
1997	Mediums, Well Done!
1998	Psi-Lines: A Book of Psychic Quotes
1999	Sense and Séance
2000	Confessions of a 900 Psychic
2000	How to Increase Your Income with ESP
2001	Silentium
2002	Loose Ends: Leaves from a Medium's Notebook
2002	Bundles
2003	Hand Springs
2004	Top Ten Mentalism with Cards
2005	Graphick: How to Read Handwriting for Fun and Profit
2009	Psychic Blues: Confessions From a Conflicted Medium
2010	Tenebrae
2015	Dolphin Tears
2016	Class Acts
2017	The Real Deal
2018	Against the Tide
2018	Total Darkness
2019	Psychic Blues: New Expanded Edition, with a foreword by James Randi, audio book

== See also ==
- Ann O'Delia Diss Debar ("One of the most extraordinary fake mediums... the world has ever known" -Houdini)
- Char Margolis
- Flim-Flam! (Psychics, ESP, Unicorns and other Delusions)
- Fortune telling fraud
- Houdini's debunking of psychics and mediums
- James Van Praagh
- John Edward
- Linda and Terry Jamison
- Long Island Medium
- Matt Fraser (psychic)
- Monica the Medium
- Peter Popoff's debunking by James Randi
- Psychic Friends Network, telephone psychic service
- Rose Mackenberg (Historic investigator of psychic mediums)
- Tyler Henry
