= Seatbelt Psychic =

American TV reality series

Seatbelt Psychic is a 2018 television series broadcast on the Lifetime TV network, starring psychic medium Thomas John who gives guests spiritual readings during a car ride.

== Background ==
Thomas John has a history working in the entertainment industry. In 2018, John developed Seatbelt Psychic for Lifetime. The show was produced by James Corden and his production company Fulwell 73. The first episode aired on July 11, 2018.

== Format ==
People receive a ride from John who tells them that he can speak to the dead. He then delivers a message he claims is from their deceased loved ones while being recorded by multiple cameras in the car.

== Reviews ==
According to skeptical writer Susan Gerbic, the show is deceptively edited to create the impression that John's guests were chosen entirely at random. Gerbic said her own investigation revealed that guests were all local Los Angeles actors whose personal information was on file or easily accessed by the show's producers, allowing John to use a form of hot reading to claim intimate knowledge of the guest was obtained via contact with the dead.

== Notable guests ==
- Jenna Dewan
