= Ian Rowland =

British sceptic (born 1961)

Ian Rowland (born 11 May 1961) is a corporate speaker, trainer and consultant based near London, England.

He has been a contributor to The Straight Dope Message Board and guest contributor of Staff Reports under the user name ianzin.

Citing Rowland's explanation of how cold reading is used in the psychic industry, Canadian journalist Malcolm Gladwell has criticised the practice of offender profiling by the FBI.
