= Hot reading =

Technique used when giving a psychic reading in stage magic performances

Hot reading is a technique used when giving a psychic reading in stage magic performances, or in other contexts. In hot reading, the reader uses information about the person receiving the reading (for example, from background research or overhearing a conversation) which the receiver is not aware that the reader already knows. Hot reading is commonly used in conjunction with cold reading (where no previously gathered information is used) and can explain how a psychic reader can get a specific claimed "hit" of accurate information. The psychics may have clients schedule their appearance ahead of time, and then collect information using collaborators who pose as religious missionaries, magazine sales people, or similar roles. Such visitors can gain a wide understanding of a person from examining their home, where tickets for the show may have been sent in advance. The "psychic" may then be briefed on the information, and told where the person will sit in the audience.

== History ==
There are many methods that involve hot reading. In 1938, the magician John Mulholland wrote:

Where do the mediums get the information? It is very easy. Look the person up in a telephone book. Talk to the corner grocer. Go to the house and try to sell a magazine subscription. Talk to the neighbours. Talk to the servants if there are any. If it is a small city go to the cemetery and look at the tombstones. It has to be done carefully but it is very easy.

Commenting on mediums from the early 20th century, historian Ruth Brandon noted:

There were a number of recognized methods in use. Some were very down-to-earth. When a medium visited a new town, he was advised to visit the local cemetery and make a note of names, dates, and any other information to be obtained from the tombstones. He might also consult the "Blue Book" for the area, a compilation circulated among mediums listing, for an increasing number of places, the names of leading spiritualists likely to attend seances, with descriptions, family histories, and details (deceased spouses, children, parents, etc.) and other information likely to be of use.

Skeptical activist Susan Gerbic lists hot reading as one of a number of methods used by psychics to achieve their effects. She points out it can be done with nothing more than a name, location, and access to Facebook.

Notable mediums from the past who were exposed as utilizing hot reading methods have included Rosina Thompson and George Valiantine.

== Modern examples of hot reading ==
Televangelist Peter Popoff's wife, Elizabeth, was seen canvassing the crowd before a show, and it was later noticed that Popoff was wearing a hearing aid. In 1986, James Randi and his associate Steve Shaw, an illusionist known professionally as Banachek, organized Project Beta with technical assistance from the crime scene analyst and electronics expert Alexander Jason. Using computerized radio scanners, Jason was able to demonstrate that Popoff's wife was using a wireless radio transmitter to broadcast information that she and her aides had culled from prayer request cards filled out by audience members. Popoff received the transmissions via an in-ear receiver and repeated the information to astonished audience members. Jason produced video segments interspersing the intercepted radio transmissions with Popoff's "miraculous" pronouncements.

Independent Investigation Group IIG director James Underdown writes that in one of the live shows of Beyond they witnessed, James Van Praagh was observed signing books and chatting with a woman he learned was from Italy. During the taping he asked that same section if there was "someone from another country". To the TV audience this would have looked impressive when she raised her hand, however he had used the hot reading technique of gaining foreknowledge.

A 2001 Time article reported that psychic John Edward allegedly used hot reading on his television show, Crossing Over, where an audience member who received a reading was suspicious of prior behaviour from Edward's aides, who had struck up conversations with audience members and asked them to fill out cards detailing their family trees. In December 2001, Edward was alleged to have used foreknowledge to hot read in an interview on the television show Dateline, where a reading for a cameraman was based on knowledge gained in conversation some hours previously, yet presented as if he were unaware of the cameraman's background. In his 2001 book, John Edward denied ever using foreknowledge, cold or hot reading.

In March 2017, alleged psychic Thomas John Flanagan was found to have used information posted on social media by people coming to his shows, in order to accurately guess details about their lives while pretending to be communicating with the dead. He unknowingly used backstories from fake Facebook profiles previously prepared by a group of skeptics led by Susan Gerbic and Mark Edward. When Flanagan used that information while pretending to hear Gerbic's and Edward's dead relatives, the only possible way he could be aware of these details is if he or members of his team read the fake profiles while preparing for their performance, since even Gerbic and Edward themselves were not aware of the specific information placed on the profiles that matched the aliases they were using when attending the show. In 2021 Flanagan held an online meeting for children aged 5–12. Two of the supposed children had fake identities and one was much older than claimed (which Flanagan failed to detect). In his readings Flanagan gave information he had previously been given in e-mails. Flanagan also used actors on his television show Seatbelt Psychic, whose lives were well documented and easily discoverable on social media.

John Oliver speculated in a February 2019 segment of Last Week Tonight that Tyler Henry may use hot reading in addition to cold reading. As an example, Oliver dissected Henry's reading of Matt Lauer concerning the father-son fishing trip that was part of the reading. Oliver showed examples of publicly available information about Lauer's love of fishing with his father, including Lauer stating this on his own show several times. Oliver summarized "Look, maybe Tyler Henry genuinely accessed the afterlife, an action which would fundamentally change our understanding of everything on Earth. Or maybe he just googled 'Matt Lauer Dad' and hit the fucking jackpot."

== See also ==
- Barnum effect
- Confidence trick
- Confirmation bias
- Kinesics
- List of parapsychology topics
- Mentalism
- Subjective validation
