= Cold reading =

Set of techniques used by mentalists, psychics, fortune-tellers, and mediums

Cold reading is a set of techniques used by mentalists, psychics, fortune-tellers, and mediums. Without prior knowledge, a practiced cold-reader can quickly obtain a great deal of information by analyzing the person's body language, age, clothing or fashion, hairstyle, gender, sexual orientation, religion, ethnicity, level of education, manner of speech, place of origin, etc. during a line of questioning. Cold readings commonly employ high-probability guesses, quickly picking up on signals as to whether their guesses are in the right direction or not. The reader then emphasizes and reinforces any accurate connections while quickly moving on from missed guesses. Psychologists believe that this appears to work because of the Barnum effect and due to confirmation biases within people.

== Basic procedure ==
Before starting the actual reading, the reader will typically try to elicit cooperation from the subject, saying something such as, "I often see images that are a bit unclear and which may sometimes mean more to you than to me; if you help, we can together uncover new things about you." One of the most crucial elements of a convincing cold reading is a subject eager to make connections or reinterpret vague statements in any way that will help the reader appear to make specific predictions or intuitions. While the reader will do most of the talking, it is the subject who provides the meaning.

After determining that the subject is cooperative, the reader will make a number of probing statements or questions, typically using variations of the methods noted below. The subject will then reveal further information with their replies (whether verbal or non-verbal) and the cold reader can continue from there, pursuing promising lines of inquiry and quickly abandoning or avoiding unproductive ones. In general, while revelations seem to come from the reader, most of the facts and statements come from the subject, which are then refined and restated by the reader so as to reinforce the idea that the reader got something correct.

Subtle cues such as changes in facial expression or body language can indicate whether a particular line of questioning is effective or not. Combining the techniques of cold reading with information obtained covertly (also called "hot reading") can leave a strong impression that the reader knows or has access to a great deal of information about the subject. Because the majority of time during a reading is spent dwelling on the "hits" the reader obtains, while the time spent recognizing "misses" is minimized, the effect gives an impression that the cold reader knows far more about the subject than an ordinary stranger could.

James Underdown from Center for Inquiry and Independent Investigations Group said, "In the context of a studio audience full of people, cold reading is not very impressive." Underdown explains cold reading from a mathematical viewpoint. A typical studio audience consists of approximately 200 people, divided up into three sections. A conservative estimate assumes each person knows 150 people. Underdown says:

This means that when John Edward or James Van Praagh asks the question "Who's Margaret?" he is hoping there is a Margaret in the 10,000 people in the database of that section. If there is no answer, they open the question up to the whole audience's database of over 30,000 people! Would it be surprising for there to be a dozen Margarets in such a large sample?

Mentalist Mark Edward relates from personal experience as a "psychic performer" how powerful a hit can be when someone in a large audience "claims" a phrase such as a "clown in a graveyard" statement. Edward describes a mental image of a clown placing flowers on graves and adds, "Does that mean anything to someone?" whereupon a woman stands up and claims that he is speaking directly to her. She remembers it as Edward specifically stating that she knew a man who dressed as a clown and placed flowers on graves in her hometown. Edward reports that it took some convincing to get her to understand that he was not directly talking to her, but had thrown the statement out to the entire audience of 300 people. She made the connection, and because it seemed so personal, and the situation so odd, she felt that he was talking to her directly.

== Specific techniques ==
=== Shotgunning ===
"Shotgunning" is a commonly used cold reading technique. This technique is named after the manner in which a shotgun fires a cluster of small projectiles in the hope that one or more of them will strike the target.

The cold reader slowly offers a huge quantity of very general information, often to an entire audience (some of which is very likely to be correct, near correct or, at the very least, provocative or evocative to someone present), observes their subjects' reactions (especially their body language), and then narrows the scope, acknowledging particular people or concepts and refining the original statements according to those reactions to promote an emotional response. A majority of people in a room will, at some point for example, have lost an older relative or known at least one person with a common name like "Mike" or "John".

Shotgunning might include a series of vague statements such as:

"I see a heart problem with a father-figure in your family."
A vast variety of medical problems have chest pain as a symptom, and heart disease is the leading cause of death worldwide. "Father-figure" can refer to somebody's father, grandfather, uncle, cousin, or any male relative who is also a parent or has served in a parental role to the person.
"I see a woman with blackness in the chest, lung cancer, heart disease, breast cancer..."
Most people will know a woman who was diagnosed with one of these problems, which are among the leading causes of illness and death.
"I sense an older male figure in your life, who wants you to know while you may have had disagreements in your life, he still loved you."
Nearly all people will have had such a person in their lives, and nearly all of them will have had a disagreement.

=== The Forer effect (Barnum statements) ===
The Forer effect relies in part on the eagerness of people to fill in details and make connections between what is said and some aspect of their own lives, often searching their entire life's history to find some connection, or reinterpreting statements in a number of different possible ways so as to make it apply to themselves.

"Barnum statements", named after P. T. Barnum, the American showman, are statements that seem personal, yet apply to many people. And while seemingly specific, such statements are often open-ended or give the reader the maximum amount of "wiggle room" in a reading. They are designed to elicit identifying responses from people. The statements can then be developed into longer and more sophisticated paragraphs and seem to reveal great amounts of detail about a person. A talented and charismatic reader can sometimes even bully a subject into admitting a connection, demanding over and over that they acknowledge a particular statement as having some relevance and maintaining that they are just not thinking hard enough, or are repressing some important memory. Barnum statements could be interpreted as weasel words.

Statements of this type might include:

- "I sense that you are sometimes insecure, especially with people you don't know very well."
- "You have a box of old unsorted photographs in your house."
- "You had an accident when you were a child involving water."
- "You're having problems with a friend or relative."
- "Your father passed on due to problems in his chest or abdomen."

Regarding the last statement, if the subject is old enough, their father is quite likely to have died, and this statement would easily apply to a large number of medical conditions including heart disease, pneumonia, diabetes, emphysema, cirrhosis of the liver, kidney failure, most types of cancer, as well as any cause of death in which cardiac arrest precedes death, or damage to the brainstem responsible for cardiopulmonary function.

==== Warm reading ====
Warm reading is a performance tool used by professional mentalists and psychic scam artists. While hot reading is the use of foreknowledge and cold reading works on reacting to the subject's responses, warm reading refers to the judicious use of Barnum effect statements.

When these psychological tricks are used properly, the statements give the impression that the mentalist, or psychic scam artist, is intuitively perceptive and psychically gifted. In reality, the statements fit nearly all of humanity, regardless of gender, personal opinions, age, epoch, culture, or nationality.

Michael Shermer gives the example of jewelry worn by those in mourning. Most people in this situation will be wearing or carrying an item of jewelry with some connection to the person they have lost, but if asked directly in the context of a psychic reading whether they have such an item, the client may be shocked and assume that the reader learned the information directly from the deceased loved one. Robert Todd Carroll notes in The Skeptic's Dictionary that some would consider this to be cold reading.

=== The rainbow ruse ===
The rainbow ruse is a crafted statement which simultaneously awards the subject a specific personality trait, as well as the opposite of that trait. With such a phrase, a cold reader can "cover all possibilities" and appear to have made an accurate deduction in the mind of the subject, despite the fact that a rainbow ruse statement is vague and contradictory. This technique is used since personality traits are not quantifiable, and also because nearly everybody has experienced both sides of a particular emotion at some time in their lives.

Statements of this type include:

- "Most of the time you are positive and cheerful, but there has been a time in the past when you were very upset."
- "You are a very kind and considerate person, but when somebody does something to break your trust, you feel deep-seated anger."
- "I would say that you are mostly shy and quiet, but when the mood strikes you, you can easily become the center of attention."

A cold reader can choose from a variety of personality traits, think of its opposite, and then bind the two together in a phrase, vaguely linked by factors such as mood, time, or potential.

== Contrasting claims of performers ==
The mentalist branch of the stage-magician community approves of "reading" as long as it is presented strictly as an artistic entertainment and one is not pretending to be psychic.

Some performers who use cold reading are honest about their use of the technique. Lynne Kelly, Kari Coleman, Ian Rowland, and Derren Brown have used these techniques at either private fortune-telling sessions or open forum "talking with the dead" sessions in the manner of those who claim to be genuine mediums. Only after receiving acclaim and applause from their audience do they reveal that they needed no psychic power for the performance, only a sound knowledge of psychology and cold reading.

In an episode of his Trick of the Mind series broadcast in March 2006, Derren Brown showed how easily people can be influenced through cold reading techniques by repeating Bertram Forer's famous demonstration of the personal validation fallacy, or Forer effect.

== Sitter misremembering ==
In a detailed review of four sittings conducted by medium Tyler Henry, Edward and Susan Gerbic reviewed all statements made by him on the TV show Hollywood Medium. In their opinion not one statement made by Henry was accurate, yet each sitter felt that their reading was highly successful. In interviews with each sitter after their sitting, all four claimed specific statements made by Henry, but, after reviewing the show, it was shown that he had not made those statements. Each sitter had misremembered what Henry said. One of many examples of this was when Henry, during a session with celebrity Ross Mathews, stated "Bambi, why am I connecting to Bambi?" Mathews stated that his father, who was a hunter, would not shoot deer because of the movie Bambi. In the post-interview, Mathews stated that "It was weird that Henry knew that my father would not shoot deer because of Bambi", demonstrating that Mathews did not remember that he, not Henry, had supplied the connection to his father.

Gerbic has pointed out the broader issue of the human brain attempting to make connections that then make it appear that the psychic was correct. She lists this among a number of techniques or situations that psychics take advantage of.

== Subconscious cold reading ==
Former New Age practitioner Karla McLaren has spoken of the importance of reducing the appearance of unusual expertise that might create a power differential; posing observations as questions rather than facts. This attempt to be polite, she realized, actually invited the other person, as McLaren has said, to "lean into the reading" and give her more pertinent information.

After some people have performed hundreds of readings, their skills may improve to the point where they may start believing they can read minds. They may ask themselves if their success is because of psychology, intuition or a psychic ability. This point of thought is known by some skeptics of the paranormal as the "transcendental temptation". Magic historian and occult investigator Milbourne Christopher has warned that the transcendental choice may lead one unknowingly into a belief in the occult and a deterioration of reason.

== In media ==
- The Wizard of Oz (1939). Professor Marvel (Frank Morgan) utilizes both cold reading and hot reading techniques on Dorothy (Judy Garland) in an effort to urge her to return home.
- Nightmare Alley (1947). Depicted ex-carny and aspiring cult leader Stanton Carlisle (Tyrone Power) using cold reading and other mentalist techniques to convince people he can communicate with the dead. The film was based on the William Lindsay Gresham novel of the same name. The novel was again adapted into a movie in 2021 and depicts many aspects of cold reading delineated in the above article.
- In Fletch Lives (1989), Irwin Fletcher uses a very heavy-handed version of cold reading to pass himself off as a faith healer during a televangelist praise meeting.
- Leap of Faith (1992). Early in the film, revival tent evangelist and phony faith healer Jonas Nightengale (Steve Martin) uses cold reading on a police officer who has pulled over his tour bus, to dissuade him from writing a ticket.
- "The Biggest Douche in the Universe" (South Park episode, 2002). Stan Marsh, one of the main characters in the animated comedy series, has an encounter with self-proclaimed psychic John Edward after attending a taping of Edward's TV show Crossing Over. Stan then uses cold reading on some passers-by in an attempt to convince his friend Kyle Broflovski that Edward is a fake, only to be mistaken for a child psychic and given his own competing TV show. This leads to a "psychic showdown" between Stan and Edward. Eventually, aliens arrive and declare Edward "The Biggest Douche in the Universe" for exploiting people's grief to gain TV ratings.
- High Spirits with Shirley Ghostman (2005). BBC TV show in which character comedian Marc Wootton portrays a spoof psychic who parodies the typical cold reading techniques used on an unsuspecting audience.
- Psych (2006). Shawn Spencer, the main character in the show, uses cold reading to convince detectives that he has psychic abilities while actually using logic, reason, keen observation skills, and an eidetic memory to solve cases.
- The Mentalist (2008). The main character is someone who formerly used cold readings to pretend to be psychic, and now uses cold reading to assist him in solving criminal cases, especially when interviewing witnesses and possible suspects. His interactions with past clients are sometimes the subjects of episodes and he often tutors his colleagues and other individuals in the tools of his trade to teach them that "there's no such thing as psychics."
- Leverage (2010). In Series 2 Episode 13 "The Future Job", Dalton Rand (Luke Perry) is a con artist who uses both hot reading (information gathering) and cold reading to convince an audience that he can communicate with the dead. The cold reading methods he uses are exposed by the team.
- In the thriller Worth Dying For (2010) Jack Reacher, a former Army MP, uses the cold reading technique to convince a policeman who he has just met that Reacher served with his cousin in action, in order to get the policeman to do him a favor. The author of the book, Lee Child, then explains to the reader how Reacher was employing this well-known fortune telling technique.
- Now You See Me (2013). One of the Four Horsemen, Merritt McKinley (Woody Harrelson), is a mentalist who uses cold reading (along with hypnotism) to assist in extortion and his illusion act.
- Comedian John Oliver addressed the topic during an episode of his talk show Last Week Tonight on February 24, 2019. In the segment, Oliver criticized the media for enabling psychics who prey on grieving families, and explained the techniques of cold reading and hot reading. On cold reading, he said: "It's like asking a room full of praying mantises: Has anybody here lost a loved one because you ate them after having sex?. You know that all those little green hands are going up. (...) The broader the generality, the higher the chance it resonates with someone – basically, it's a magic trick, and yet prominent, smart people are willing to cosign on psychics' abilities."

== See also ==
- Confidence trick
- Confirmation bias
- Forer effect
- Hot reading
- Kinesics
- List of parapsychology topics
- List of topics characterized as pseudoscience
- Mentalism
- Subjective validation

== Bibliography ==
- Cline, Austin. What Is Cold Reading? Skeptical Perspectives.
- Dutton, Denis The Cold Reading Technique
- Dickson, D. H., & Kelly, I. W. "The 'Barnum effect' in personality assessment: A review of the literature," Psychological Reports, 57, 367–82, (1985).
- Hunter, Colin. Cold Reading: Confessions of a "Psychic".
- Hyman, Ray (28 July 2009). "Guide to Cold Reading".
- Hyman, Ray (Spring/Summer 1977). "'Cold Reading': How to Convince Strangers That You Know All About Them," The Skeptical Inquirer.
- Hyman, Ray (1989). The Elusive Quarry: A Scientific Appraisal of Psychical Research. Prometheus Books.
- Keene, M. Lamar (1997). The Psychic Mafia. Prometheus Books.
- Randi, James (1982). Flim-Flam! Buffalo, New York: Prometheus Books.
- Shermer, Michael (1 August 2001). "Deconstructing The Dead: Cross Over One Last Time To Expose Medium John Edward," Scientific American.
- Stagnaro, Angelo (2002). Something from Nothing. Manipulix Books.
- Stagnaro, Angelo (2005). The Other Side. Manipulix Books.
