= James Van Praagh =

American psychic

- Born: August 23, 1958 (age 68); Bayside, Queens, New York, U.S.
- Occupations: author, producer, television personality

James Van Praagh (/væn ˈprɑːɡ/) is an American writer and television personality who describes himself as a clairvoyant and spiritual medium. He has written numerous books, including The New York Times bestseller Talking to Heaven. Van Praagh was a producer and screenwriter on the 2002 CBS primetime semi-autobiographical miniseries Living with the Dead starring Ted Danson. He also hosted a short-lived paranormal talk show called Beyond with James Van Praagh.

Skeptical activists such as James Randi and Joe Nickell, organizations such as the Independent Investigations Group, and notable media personalities, including Barbara Walters and John Oliver, have attempted to counter the perception that what Van Praagh and other mediums do reflects reality. Critics maintain that Van Praagh's readings are produced through cold reading and hot reading techniques and not through psychic powers.

== Early life ==
Van Praagh was born in Bayside, New York and is the youngest of four children. He said that from an early age he experienced spiritual phenomena, including once when he was eight years old: while he was praying to God, a glowing open hand appeared through his ceiling, an experience which he described as peaceful. Raised Roman Catholic, he was an altar boy, and at the age of 14 he attended pre-seminary. According to his website, he lost interest in organized religion and left the seminary after he claims a spirit whispered to him, "God is much bigger than these four walls; you must leave and find God outside in the world." His mother, Jeanne, died in 1985; Van Praagh claims she visits and guides him frequently.

He graduated from San Francisco State University, where he majored in Broadcasting and Communications with the goal of becoming a screenwriter, then moved to Los Angeles in hopes of getting a job with the TV show Hill Street Blues. Instead he got an entry-level office job at Paramount, which he eventually quit after developing an avid interest in spiritualism and visiting medium Brian Hurst, who predicted he would become a medium and stated that the spirit world would assist him in "changing the consciousness of the planet." Van Praagh began doing readings and continued seeking to learn about developing mediumship. In his bestselling book Talking to Heaven, he writes that paranormal ectoplasm is "especially developed in mediums" and described his early experience of a séance in which he saw a cheesecloth-like substance emanating from British celebrity medium Leslie Flint, who Van Praagh claims inspired him by channeling his mother.

== Career ==
Van Praagh began his early career by giving private readings for clients by allegedly communicating with the spirits of their deceased friends and relatives, and quickly graduated to wider audiences through the sale and distribution of a series of audiotapes and books. In the early 1990s he began appearing on the NBC paranormal talk show The Other Side (broadcast 1994–1995), where he became a resident expert. Van Praagh credits an appearance on Larry King Live in 1997 to promote his new book Talking to Heaven for his gaining worldwide exposure. "The book went from 6,000 copies to 600,000 copies in less than three months", he said. He has appeared on The Oprah Winfrey Show, Larry King Live, Dr. Phil, A&E's Biography, Nightline, Unsolved Mysteries, The View, The Joy Behar Show, Today, Chelsea Lately, and Coast to Coast. He worked with a non-profit called The Compassionate Friends, an organization for people who lost children or siblings. He is also a regular blogger for The Huffington Post.

Van Praagh's work centers on his belief that there is no death, and that people who have died still exist, only in a different form. Van Praagh claims these spirits help guide him, and that they have told him there are "many levels of Heaven and we get to that level we have created by our thoughts, words and deeds while on earth."

=== Author ===
Van Praagh has written numerous books that have been translated into multiple languages and sold numerous copies. His 1999 book Talking to Heaven, which recounts stories about his contact with the deceased, held the top slot on the New York Times Best Seller List for weeks. In 2008 he released Ghosts Among Us, which goes into detail about ghosts and the spirit world. His 2011 book Growing Up in Heaven: The Eternal Connection Between Parent and Child, gives a detailed portrayal of what he claims happens to the souls of children after they die.

=== Living with the Dead (2002) ===
In April 2002, CBS aired Living with the Dead (also known by the alternate title, Talking to Heaven), a four-hour miniseries based on Van Praagh and directed by Stephen Gyllenhaal, with the screenplay by John Pielmeier. Although the series followed Van Praagh's experiences, it included a fictional mystery around the murder of a teenage boy at the hands of a serial killer. Van Praagh was played by Ted Danson, his mother by Diane Ladd and his father by Jack Palance. Danson received praise from outlets like the Chicago Tribune and People for his portrayal of Van Praagh as a man anguished by his lifelong visions of the dead, including his mother.

=== Beyond with James Van Praagh (2002) ===
During the success of the paranormal television show Crossing Over with John Edward in the early 2000s, Van Praagh and Tribune Entertainment launched Beyond with James Van Praagh, a paranormal talk show that distributed in broadcast syndication, though it was unsuccessful, only running a half-season in the fall of 2002. Beyond followed a similar format as Crossing Over, with Van Praagh giving audience members and celebrities readings, as well as field investigations into crimes and missing persons.

=== Talking with the Dead (2004) ===
CBS aired Talking with the Dead (also known by the alternative title, The Dead Will Tell), a thriller based on Van Praagh's experiences and directed by Stephen Kay, on October 24, 2004. Anne Heche produced and starred in the film as Emily Parkes, a woman who receives an antique engagement ring from her fiancé and begins to have visions of its murdered previous owner. The made-for-TV movie also starred Eva Longoria, Christopher Guest and Chris Sarandon.

=== Ghost Whisperer (2005-2010) ===
Van Praagh served as co-executive producer on the CBS show Ghost Whisperer, which starred Jennifer Love Hewitt. Though the work and experiences of Van Praagh may have influenced the teleplay, Ghost Whisperer was actually inspired by psychic Mary Ann Wynchowski, a woman whom Van Praagh met while filming Beyond with James Van Praagh in 2002. Ghost Whisperer ran for five seasons from September 23, 2005, to May 21, 2010, on CBS.

=== Lawsuit ===
On January 22, 2013, James Van Praagh filed a lawsuit in federal district court in New York against his sister Lynn Gratton, who also claims to be a psychic. James Van Praagh has a trademark on his name and alleged that Lynn had infringed upon that trademark by starting to use her maiden name Van Praagh to financially benefit from his name even though Lynn took her (now deceased) husband's surname more than 50 years ago when she married him on August 28, 1970.

== Skepticism ==
There have been several prominent skeptics of the paranormal who have questioned Van Praagh's abilities. The James Randi Educational Foundation made a public offer to Van Praagh through the Huffington Post to take the JREF One Million Dollar Paranormal Challenge to test his psychic abilities. James Randi said "James Van Praagh and Allison DuBois have turned the huckster art of 'cold reading' into a multimillion-dollar industry, preying on families' deepest fears and regrets." Van Praagh did not accept the challenge.

In 2008, Barbara Walters called Van Praagh dangerous when he shared her blood seemed not to be flowing correctly.

In a 2019 television segment on Last Week Tonight, John Oliver criticized the media for promoting TV psychic mediums such as Van Praagh, because this exposure convinces viewers that such powers are real, and so enable neighborhood psychics to prey on grieving families. Oliver said "...when psychic abilities are presented as authentic, it emboldens a vast underworld of unscrupulous vultures, more than happy to make money by offering an open line to the afterlife, as well as many other bullshit services."

=== Hot reading ===
Paranormal investigator Joe Nickell believes Van Praagh uses tactics such as hot reading, or gleaning information from sitters beforehand. Group readings improve the odds that at least one person in the audience will identify with a general statement made with conviction. Shows are edited before airing to show only what appear to be hits and removing anything that does not reflect well on the medium.

In 2003 the Independent Investigations Group (IIG) attended a taping of Van Praagh's talk show Beyond. According to the IIG, there were differences between the live segments and how they were edited for broadcast. In one of the live shows they witnessed, Van Praagh was signing books and chatted with a woman who was from Italy. During the taping, he asked if there was "someone from another country," and the same woman raised her hand, which, to the investigators, was evidence of a "hot reading".

In Skeptic Magazine, Michael Shermer stated that Van Praagh was "caught" using a hot reading technique on 20/20 and that numerous television producers have confirmed that Van Praagh uses hot-reading techniques. Shermer quotes producer Leah Hanes as stating:

I can't say I think James Van Praagh is a total fraud, because he came up with things I hadn't told him, but there were moments on the show when he appeared to be coming up with fresh information that he got from me and other researchers earlier on. For example, I recall him asking about the profession of the deceased loved one of one of our guests, and I told him he was a fireman. Then, when the show began, he said something to the effect, "I see a uniform. Was he a policeman or fireman please?" Everyone was stunned, but he got that directly from me.

In a 2011 ABC News segment, reporter Josh Elliott was read by Van Praagh, and was initially impressed by details provided, though later Elliott revealed that what was detailed was easily available through a basic web search.

== Personal life ==
Van Praagh is married to his husband, whom he began dating in 1995.

== Selected bibliography ==
- Praagh, James Van (2014). Adventures of the Soul : Journeys Through the Physical and Spiritual Dimensions. California: Hay House Inc. ISBN 978-1-4019-4470-4.
- Praagh, James Van (2014). The Soul's Journey Lesson Cards : 44 Cards and Guide. California: Hay House Inc. ISBN 978-1-4019-4471-1.
- Praagh, James Van (2013). How to Heal A Grieving Heart (with Doreen Virtue). California: Hay House Inc. ISBN 978-1-4019-4336-3.
- Praagh, James Van (2013). Talking to Heaven Mediumship Cards (with Doreen Virtue). California: Hay House Inc. ISBN 978-1-4019-4261-8.
- Praagh, James Van (2011). Growing Up in Heaven : The Eternal Connection Between Parent and Child. New York: HarperOne. ISBN 978-0-06-2024633.
- Praagh, James Van (2008). Ghosts among us : uncovering the truth about the other side (1st HarperCollins pbk. ed.). New York: HarperCollins. ISBN 978-0-06-155338-7.
- Praagh, James Van (2009). Unfinished business : what the dead can teach us about life (1st ed.). New York: HarperOne. ISBN 978-0-06-177814-8.
- Praagh, James Van (2003). Meditations with James Van Praagh. New York: Simon & Schuster. ISBN 0-7432-2943-6.
- Praagh, James Van (2003). Looking Beyond : a teen's guide to the spiritual world. New York: Simon & Schuster. ISBN 0-7432-2942-8.
- Praagh, James Van (2002). Heaven and Earth : making the psychic connection. New York: Pocket Books. ISBN 0-7432-2726-3.
- Praagh, James Van (2000). Healing Grief : reclaiming life after any loss. New York: New American Library. ISBN 0-451-20169-8.
- Praagh, James Van (1999). Talking to Heaven : a medium's message of life after death. New York: Penguin Group. ISBN 0-451-19172-2.
- Praagh, James Van (1999). Reaching to heaven : a spiritual journey through life and death. New York: Dutton. ISBN 0-525-94481-8.
