= John Edward =

American psychic medium (born 1969)

- Born: John Edward McGee Jr. October 19, 1969 (age 56); Glen Cove, New York, U.S.
- Occupation: Television personality
- Spouse: Sandra McGee
- Children: 2, including Olivia Edward
- Website: johnedward.net

John Edward McGee Jr. (born October 19, 1969), known professionally as John Edward, is an American television personality, writer and self-proclaimed psychic medium.

After writing his first book on the subject in 1998, Edward became a well-known (and controversial) figure in the United States with his shows broadcast on the Sci-Fi Channel premiering in July 2000 along with broadcasting on We TV from 2006 to 2008.

== Biography ==
Edward (born in Glen Cove, New York) is the only son of an Irish-American police officer and an Italian-American working mother. He was raised Roman Catholic and although he later stopped practicing, he stated that he has never stopped feeling connected to God and his Catholic roots. Edward was quoted saying, "This is something that is driven by a belief in God. It's the energy from that force that I think allows us to create this energy."

According to Edward, when he was 15 and "a huge doubter" (in psychic abilities), he was read by a New Jersey woman who convinced him that he could become a medium. In 1998, he said: "She told me things that there is no way she could have known. And the first part of the reading was that this was the path that I was supposed to be on and that I was supposed to be a teacher and help people and – I thought she was nuts." At his father's request, he adopted his middle name as a professional surname when he became a professional psychic.

Later, Edward worked as a phlebotomist while pursuing a degree in health care administration at Long Island University. He met his wife, Sandra McGee, when he was a student in a dance studio, and he became a ballroom dancing instructor. He and his wife have a son and a daughter; their second child, Olivia, is an actress.

== Television shows ==
Edward published his first book, One Last Time, in 1998. His related appearance on Larry King Live later in the year prompted enough phone calls to overload the show's switchboard. The next year, Edward had a show of his own.

=== Crossing Over with John Edward ===
From 2001 to 2004, Edward was the producer and host of the show Crossing Over with John Edward, which has been syndicated and was broadcast on the Sci-Fi Channel in the United States and on Living TV in the UK. In Crossing Over, Edward gave psychic readings to audience members.

==== Show format ====
Readings in Crossing Over involve Edward questioning audience members with what is presented as information being supposedly "communicated" by deceased friends and relatives. Edward says he receives images and clues from "the other side" which the audience must try to interpret. The audience is not supposed to supply Edward with any prior information about themselves, their family or whom they are trying to connect with "on the other side", aside from questionnaires filled out prior to taping. Audience members respond to Edward's statements and questions, adding any details they feel are appropriate. The show often employs a split screen, the view of a reading without sound on one half of the screen while on the other half the subjects of the reading are shown in a later interview as they discuss their experiences. A voiceover by Edward is also implemented at times, sharing further insights.

In other instances, Edward conducted private sessions away from the studio audience. The subjects of these segments later spoke in greater detail about the situation that led to their reading with Edward and the effect the reading had on their lives. Periodically, segments revisit people who have previously appeared on the show.

==== 9/11 special ====
Shortly after the September 11 attacks, Edward began filming at least one special in which he met with some relatives of the victims, with the intention of communicating with those who were killed. According to Edward's autobiography, he did not know that the producers had chosen the victims' families to appear on the show. The trade magazine Broadcasting & Cable sent a story, "'Psychic' Plans WTC Victims Show", on the daily subscription-fax sent to news media and TV station executives on October 25, 2001.

Steve Rosenberg, president of domestic television at Studios USA, the company that distributes Edward's program, had tentatively scheduled the program(s) to be broadcast during the November sweeps period, but news of the taping sparked a national outcry. Both the Sci-Fi Channel and the Crossing Over with John Edward production office were flooded with phone calls and e-mails, some expressing outrage at the exploitation of the national tragedy, others at what they perceived as extreme tastelessness in search of ratings. Rosenberg initially ignored the criticism, insisting the programming would go on as scheduled, but within hours he terminated his plans.

=== John Edward Cross Country ===
Edward's next show, John Edward Cross Country, was broadcast on We TV from March 2006 to late 2008. In each episode, after a reading, Edward is filmed visiting the person or people whose reading was televised, along with their families, to see how the experience had changed their lives.

During the first season of Cross Country, Edward traveled across the US, giving readings to large audiences in public venues. In subsequent seasons, the show was broadcast from a set similar to that used for Crossing Over.

== International appearances ==
Edward's tours outside the US have included performances in Canada, Australia, the UK, and Ireland. In response to the announcement of his 2019 Australian tour, The Sydney Morning Herald published an article by Peter FitzSimons which called Edward a fraud.

== Collaboration with law enforcement ==
In 2025, in a book co-authored with Edward titled Chasing Evil, Robert Hilland, a retired FBI agent, revealed that from 1998 until his retirement in the early 2020s, Edward had collaborated with him to find leads on criminal cases, including that of murderer John Smith and locating the body of a missing toddler. Initially skeptical, Hilland had decided, in his words, that "just because I don't understand something doesn't mean I should dismiss it."

== Veracity of abilities ==
Critics of Edward assert that he performs the mentalist techniques of hot reading and cold reading, in which one respectively uses prior knowledge or a wide array of quick and sometimes general guesses to create the impression of psychic ability. Choosing the first reading from a two-hour tape of edited shows as a sample, illusionist and skeptic James Randi found that just 3 of 23 statements made by Edward were confirmed as correct by the audience member being read, and the three statements that were correct were also trivial and nondescript.

In October 2007, Edward appeared on Headline Prime, hosted by Glenn Beck. When asked if he would take "the Amazing Randi's" challenge, Edward responded, "It's funny. I was on Larry King Live once, and they asked me the same question. And I made a joke [then], and I'll say the same thing here: why would I allow myself to be tested by somebody who's got an adjective as a first name?" Beck simply allowed Edward to continue, ignoring the challenge.

In another incident, Edward was said to have used foreknowledge to hot read in an interview on the television show Dateline. James Underdown of the Independent Investigative Group (IIG) attended a Crossing Over show in November 2002 and said "there were no indications of anyone I saw collecting information... none of his readings contained the kind of specific information that would raise an eyebrow of suspicion. ... John Edward was a bad cold reader. He, too, struggled to get hits, and in one attempt shot off nearly 40 guesses before finding any significant targets."

Underdown also claimed that Edward's apparent accuracy on television may be inflated by the editing process. After watching the broadcast version of the show he had attended and recorded, Underdown attributed a great deal of Edward's accuracy on television to editing and wrote, "Edward's editor fine-tuned many of the dead-ends out of a reading riddled with misses." In 2002, Edward said, "People are in the studio for eight hours, and we have to edit the show for time, not content. We don't try to hide the 'misses'." Edward has denied ever using hot or cold reading techniques.

In a 2019 segment of Last Week Tonight, Edward and other prominent TV psychics were featured. Several clips of Edward attempting cold reading and failing to get "hits" were included, as well as a clip of Edward telling an audience member, "I can only tell you what they're showing me, and if he's calling your mother a bitch, I'm gonna pass that on." John Oliver criticized the predatory nature of the psychic industry, as well as the media for promoting psychics, because this convinces viewers that psychic powers are real, and so enables neighborhood psychics to prey on grieving families. Oliver said "...when psychic abilities are presented as authentic, it emboldens a vast underworld of unscrupulous vultures, more than happy to make money by offering an open line to the afterlife, as well as many other bullshit services."

== Appearances in the media ==
Edward has appeared or been mentioned in many television shows, including ABC's 20/20, The Big Idea with Donny Deutsch, The Crier Report, Dateline NBC, The Early Show, Entertainment Tonight, Family Guy, Fox and Friends, Jimmy Kimmel Live!, Larry King Live, HBO's America Undercover, Live with Regis & Kelly, Maury, The Oprah Winfrey Show, Penn & Teller: Bullshit!, The 7pm Project, Sam Pang Tonight, The Tony Danza Show, The View, The Wayne Brady Show, Will & Grace, Keeping up with the Kardashians, Kourtney and Kim Take New York and Dr. Phil..

The adult animated TV series South Park featured Edward in the episode "The Biggest Douche in the Universe". The series' co-creators, Trey Parker and Matt Stone, credit James Randi for Stan's explanation of cold reading.
