= Thomas John (medium) =

American psychic medium

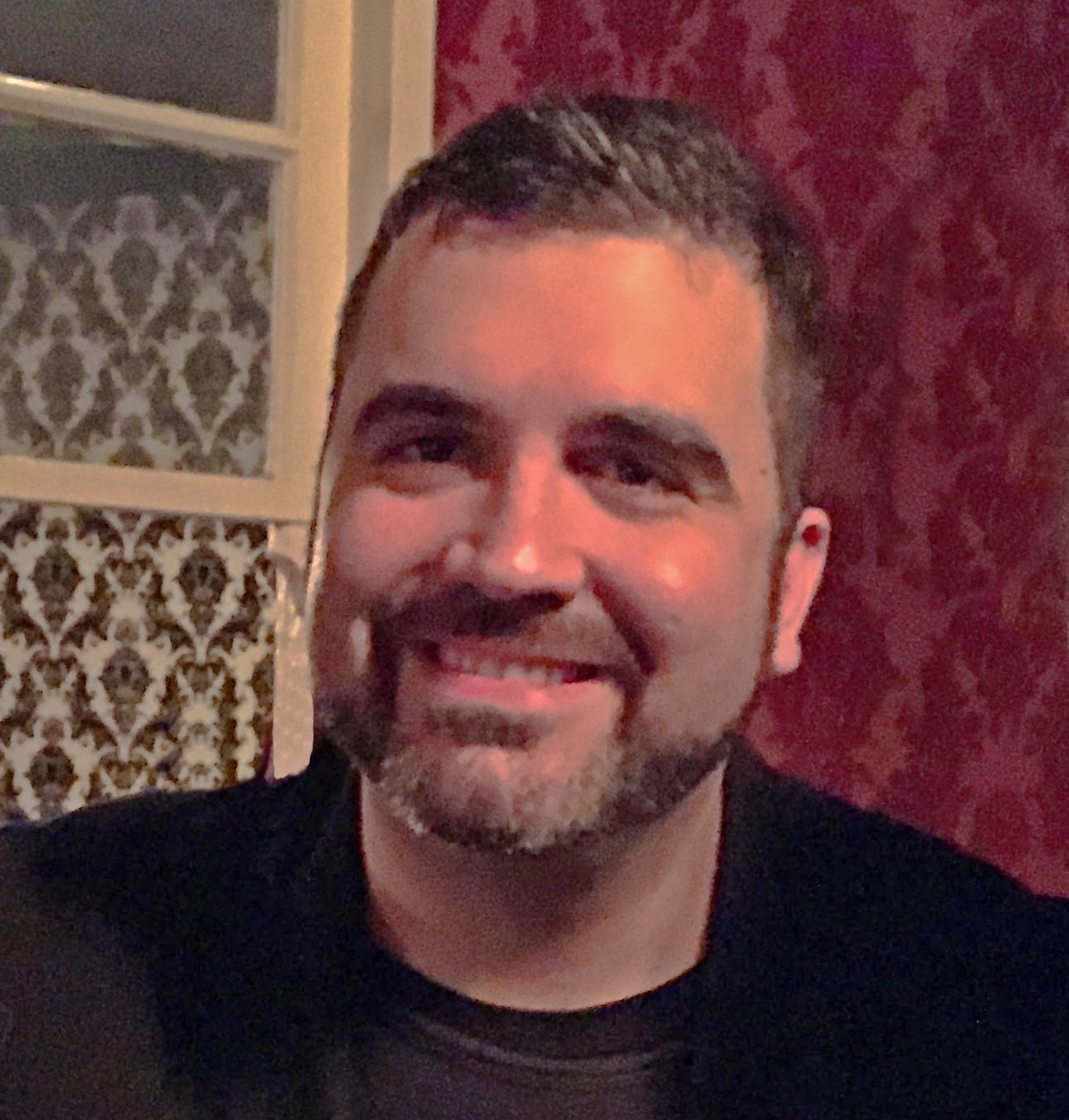
- Born: Thomas John Flanagan
- Occupation: Psychic medium
- Website: www.mediumthomas.com

Thomas John Flanagan, known professionally as Thomas John, is an American psychic medium. He starred in the 2018 reality TV show, Seatbelt Psychic, and the CBS All Access series The Thomas John Experience beginning in June 2020. In January 2020, John began a live show at Caesars Palace in Las Vegas, which was put on hiatus as of March 16, 2020.

John has been the subject of significant criticism, including his use of information acquired online during group readings (hot readings).

== Early life ==
According to John, he had his first psychic experience when he was 4 years old and saw his deceased grandfather. He said that he experienced his grandfather in a room when he was physically not there, in addition to having seen his grandfather at birthday parties.

John has also described his encounters with spirits as vague details coming up first, and specifics being spoken to him after.

== Mediumship career ==
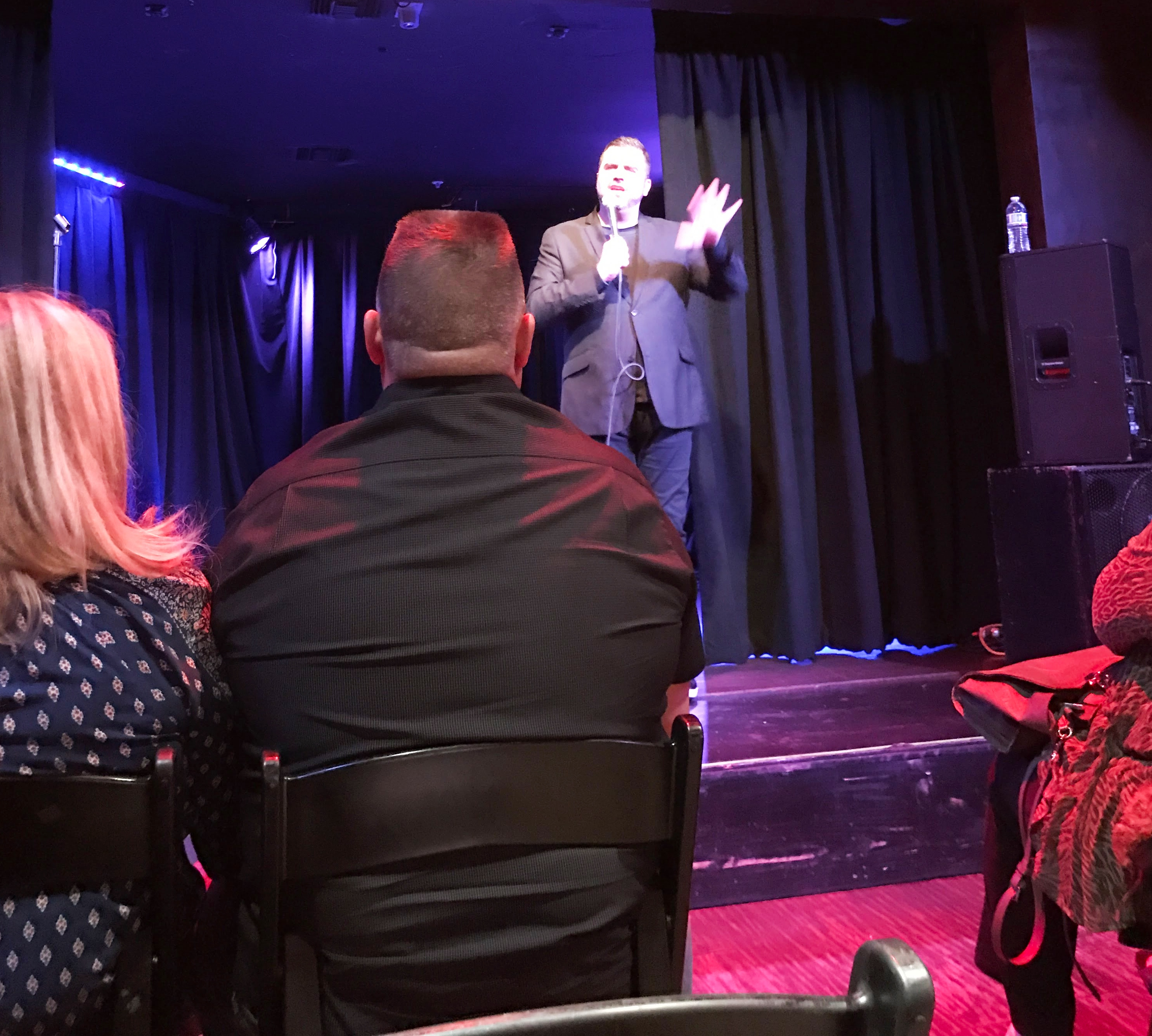
Thomas John on stage in 2017

John first started working professionally as a medium in his mid-20s, and has worked in New York City and Los Angeles. John gives private readings to clients and holds speaking events in person and online. John stars in the reality TV show The Thomas John Experience, which premiered on June 4, 2020, on CBS All Access. The show was recorded in cities around the United States including New Orleans, Chicago, Boston, and Los Angeles. A Las Vegas Magazine review praised John's live show at Cleopatra's Barge inside Caesars Palace, which premiered on January 16, 2020. The show was put on indefinite hiatus on March 16, 2020.

A musical based on John's life and experiences titled Dead Serious premiered off-Broadway in July 2019. Co-written by Michelle Wendt and John, the musical pulled from John's personal stories, exploring his journey as a medium. Dead Serious played from July through September 2019 at the Theatre Center in New York City. Lifetime produced a reality TV show starring John called Seatbelt Psychic. This show began its run on July 11, 2018, and stars John as a ridesharing company driver who surprises passengers when he delivers messages from their deceased relatives.

=== Reception ===
In March 2017, John was accused of doing a hot reading after a sting operation planned and implemented by Susan Gerbic and mentalist Mark Edward. Gerbic and Edward attended John's show using aliases, and John "read" them as a married couple. During the entire reading, John failed to determine the actual identities of Gerbic and Edward, or that they were deceptive during his reading. All personal information he gave them matched what was on their falsified Facebook accounts, rather than being about their actual lives.

In early 2021, John announced plans to hold a "Virtual Spirit Circle for Children" on April 19. Upon learning of this event, neurologist Steven Novella criticized what he saw as the exploitation of child bereavement.

== Legal issues ==
In 2009, John was arrested and pleaded guilty to theft and computer fraud for posting fake apartment ads on Craigslist and stealing the security deposits from renters.

== Publications ==
- John, Thomas (25 February 2015). Never Argue with a Dead Person: True and Unbelievable Stories from the Other Side. Hampton Roads Publishing. ISBN 978-1571747242.
