= Janet Lee (psychic) =

American psychic fortune teller (born 1974)

- Born: 1974 (age 51–52)
- Other names: The Greenwich psychic, The Bedford psychic
- Occupation: Psychic
- Website: www.greenwichpsychic.com

Janet Lee, also known as the Greenwich psychic and the Bedford psychic, is an American psychic based in Bedford Hills, New York. She has been working as a psychic since the late 1990s and says she was born with the gift. Her specialities include psychic readings, tarot card readings and past life readings.

Lee has been successfully sued by a former client over a fortune telling scam and has been arrested and convicted for fraudulently trying to rent a luxury apartment in Soho, New York.

== Early life ==
Lee comes from a family of people claiming to have psychic powers. Both her mother and her maternal grandmother claim to have psychic abilities and she claims to have started to experience the abilities as a young girl. She said that at around the age of 10 she started seeing bad things everywhere. She didn't understand what was happening and didn't want to go to public spaces as she would see horrific images in her mind. She said that her mother and grandmother told her that it would get better and that they coached her and helped her to control it. She remembers at age eleven her grandmother telling her to use her gift to help others.

== Career ==
Lee initially found success as a psychic reader when she worked at Saks Fifth Avenue on Greenwich Ave. The store offered her services as a psychic for free to all customers who spent over $100 as part of a promotion. The promotion proved very successful for her, according to Lee “It was so successful, the line wrapped around the cosmetic counter. And they all wanted follow-ups.” Shortly after this initial success she opened her own business on Greenwich Avenue, Greenwich, Connecticut, calling herself the Greenwich psychic. Lee saw success in this business too, she had a team of employees who would handle tarot card readings but, as the Greenwich psychic, she was the only one who would handle spiritual work.

Fees for a reading ranged in the $150–200 price range and she claimed that some clients would pay between $2,000 and $9,000 per month to have her available for consultation 24 hours a day. Lee's main clients included Wall Street brokers and other wealthy inhabitants of Greenwich. Her business is currently located in Bedford Hills, New York. Lee claims that she has been contacted by police in the past to help find missing people using her psychic powers but doesn't claim to have been able to help in those occasions. She has been sued by a former client for taking the clients life savings under the pretence of cleansing it from "dark forces" and not giving the money back.

== Fraud and convictions ==
=== 2009: Giving a false statement to police ===
On July 11, 2009 Lee called the police from Greenwich Hospital claiming to have been beaten by a man outside her business on Greenwich Avenue. She initially claimed that a rival psychic was trying to threaten her but the police became suspicious when a number of holes appeared in her claims. When the police checked her phone records they found that she was nowhere near her business address at the alleged time of the attack. Additionally, according to details in her arrest warrant, she had initially told her father at the hospital that her husband had beaten her. When the police asked her if the attack happened somewhere else and was committed by her husband, Lee responded by saying "All I can say is, I can't say it didn't happen in Greenwich". She was charged with giving a false statement to police but the charges were later dropped when she completed an accelerated rehabilitation program.

=== 2015: Lawsuit against Lee ===
In a lawsuit filed in Stamford in 2015 it was alleged that Lee convinced a woman to withdraw her life savings in order to give the money to Lee for safe keeping. She had convinced the woman that there were "dark forces" surrounding the money and that she would put the money safely in a box in St. Patrick's Cathedral to be cleansed for 6 months. Lee refused to give the money back after the agreed upon 6 month time frame which led to the lawsuit. The presiding judge ruled in favor of the plaintiff, ordering Lee to give the woman her $30,000 back. In an interview in December 2018 Lee said she still plans to give the money back to the woman.

=== 2017: Forgery and identity theft ===
Lee was arrested in June 2017 while trying to rent a luxury apartment using someone else's identity along with forged documents. She asked to inspect an apartment in SoHo, New York and upon inspection agreed to lease the space. She presented all of her identity theft victims personal information including their social security number along with a forged driver's license and was told to come back the next day to sign the lease. She returned the next day and forged her identity theft victim's signature over 60 times on the lease documents.

The police, who had been tipped off by the realtor, then came out of their hiding spot and arrested her. Upon arrest Lee was charged with identity theft in the first degree, forgery in the second degree and criminal possession of a forged instrument in the second degree, all felonies. At her hearing in November 2017 she took a plea deal and was convicted of forgery in the second degree. In an interview in December 2018 she claimed that this was the first time she'd done anything wrong.

== Lawsuit against Bob Nygaard ==
In December 2018, Lee filed a lawsuit against Bob Nygaard, a private investigator who specializes in psychic fraud. In the lawsuit, she alleges that Nygaard had slandered and defamed her by contacting her past clients, who had been wronged by her, and convincing them to file criminal charges. She also claims that Nygaard's investigation and the criminal charges filed against her have cost her a contract for a reality series called The True Greenwich Psychic. She was seeking $44 million in damages. In August 2020 the case was dismissed and "Nygaard filed a counterclaim against Lee for defamation".

== See also ==
- Ann O'Delia Diss Debar
- Flim-Flam! (Psychics, ESP, Unicorns and other Delusions)
- Cold reading
- Confidence trick
- Divination
- Fortune telling fraud
- Houdini's debunking of psychics and mediums
- Mark Edward
- Psychic Blues: Confessions of a Conflicted Medium
- Psychic Friends Network, telephone psychic service
- Rose Mackenberg (Historic investigator of psychic mediums)
- Scientific Skepticism
- Thomas John Flanagan
