= Pet psychic =

Psudoscientific claims of animal communication

A pet psychic is a person who claims to communicate by psychic means with animals, either living or dead. They are also known as animal communicators, and their practice as intuitive animal communication or intuitive interspecies communication.

The term psychic refers to the claimed ability to perceive information unavailable to the normal senses by what is claimed to be extrasensory perception. It is the opinion of scientific skeptics that people believe in such abilities due to cognitive biases and the use of various techniques by the practitioners, including intentional deception.

== Claims ==
Pet psychics rely on different techniques when doing an animal "reading". These psychics allegedly communicate with animals and connect with an animal's spirit. Some claim that the readings are done by communicating with their electromagnetic energy, similar to reiki and/or therapeutic touch healing. Others claim the animal does not need to be alive or physically close to the psychic, as phone readings are sometimes done.

In the early twentieth century, the Association for Research and Enlightenment began researching paranormal and psychic abilities in humans. The first animal communicators claimed they could communicate telepathically with animals living or dead.

== Scientific analysis ==
Skeptical investigator Joe Nickell reported on this topic in the Skeptical Inquirer in 2002. He reported that cold reading can explain why so many pet psychics appear to communicate with animals. Pet psychics like Gerri Leigh and Animal Planet's Sonya Fitzpatrick work in front of audiences with the pets and owners present at the same time. Although appearing to be impressive, the conclusions and pronouncements are "validated" by the pet owners and not the pets themselves. Furthermore, linguistic professor Karen Stollznow tested a pet psychic with a cat named Jed. Not only was the psychic "completely inaccurate in her reading of Jed's age, place of birth, background, behavior, health, and my health ...", she was unable to tell that Jed was not her cat. Stollznow concluded that "language is human-species specific. We don't and can't 'know' what animals think."

Skeptic Robert Todd Carroll has described the claims of pet psychics as quackery. According to Carroll "the king of the animal quackers has to be Rupert Sheldrake, who thinks he's proved that some pets are psychic."

Skeptical investigator Benjamin Radford wrote about this topic in 2012 and said:

Even though thousands of people claim to be able to communicate with animals, there hasn't been a single scientific test proving their abilities. Professional pet psychics often sell books and teach seminars about their power, but don't prove that they can actually do what they claim.

Radford also outlined a simple 3-step test that would provide proof of this claimed ability, but predicted that pet psychics would always fail such a test. He also reported that "The problem of pet psychics taking advantage of grieving pet owners plagues people like Dr. Wally Sife, founder of The Association for Pet Loss and Bereavement, a national nonprofit organization dedicated to providing grief counseling for people who have lost beloved animals."

In 2012, the hosts of the Oh No, Ross and Carrie! podcast investigated the efficacy of pet psychics and were unimpressed.

== See also ==
- Animal loss
- Animism
- Psychic fraud investigator
- Flim-Flam! (Psychics, ESP, Unicorns and other Delusions)
- Fortune telling fraud
- Houdini's debunking of psychics
- List of topics characterized as pseudoscience
- Magic (paranormal)
- Occult
- Psychic Blues: Confessions of a Conflicted Medium
- Psychic Friends Network
- Psychic reading
- Scrying
- Séance
- Tarotology
