= Miami Psychic =

2006 memoir by Gina Marie Marks

Miami Psychic: Confessions of a Confidante
- Authors: Regina Milbourne; Yvonne Carey
- Language: English
- Genre: memoir
- Publisher: HarperCollins
- Publication date: 2006
- Publication place: United States
- ISBN: 978-0-06-174774-8

Miami Psychic: Confessions of a Confidante is a 2006 memoir published by the Regan Books division of HarperCollins. The authors are listed as Regina Milbourne and Yvonne Carey.

== Subject matter ==
The book purports to be a true memoir about a psychic named Regina Milbourne, who used her supposed paranormal "gifts" to help many of Miami's least desirable element: drug dealers, thieves, murderers and pedophiles. Regina claims that she "comes clean" in the book, "divulging the unimaginable horrors and shocking confessions that she witnessed throughout her career".

== True identity of author ==
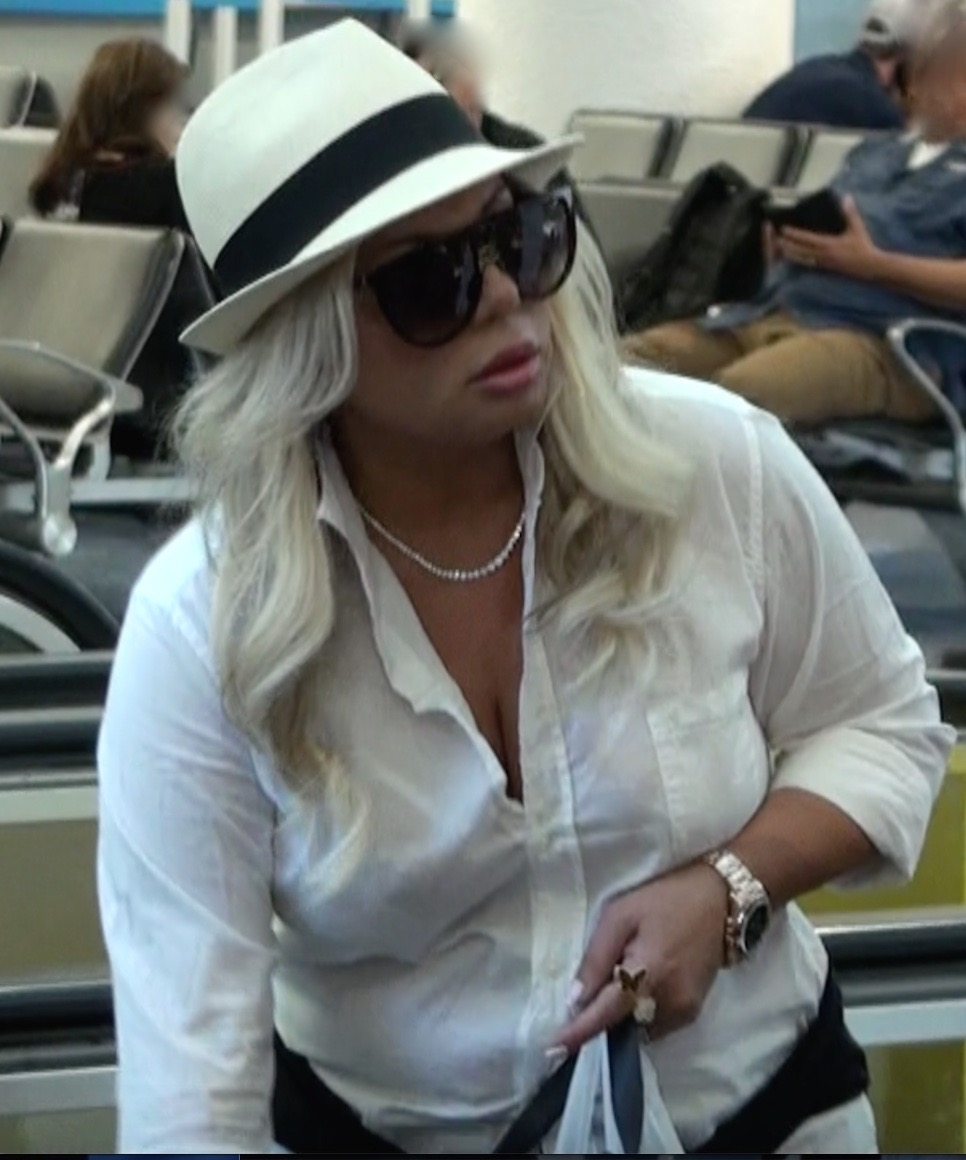
Gina Marks, 8/31/17

Shortly after the book was published, the true identity of "Regina" was revealed to be Gina Marie Marks, who had a series of arrests and convictions in Florida for perpetrating psychic fraud over many years. Marks continued her criminal activity after the publishing of the book.

In 2018, Marks was convicted of stealing more than $340,000 from five victims over three years using the pseudonym Natalie Miller. Although she pleaded guilty to psychic fraud charges, Marks blamed her misfortune on racism against "gypsies", saying "They're racist on my culture. We do have power. We’re not allowed to talk about it."

On August 11, 2018, CBS broadcast an episode of its true crime TV show, Pink Collar Crimes, titled "The Psychic Didn't See Him Coming". The episode recounts the story of private eye Bob Nygaard and his numerous pursuits of Marks to obtain justice for his clients between 2008 and 2018.

== See also ==
- Ann O'Delia Diss Debar ("One of the most extraordinary fake mediums... the world has ever known" -Houdini)
- Bob Nygaard (Psychic fraud investigator)
- Charlatan
- Confidence trick
- Con artist
- Flim-Flam! (Psychics, ESP, Unicorns and other Delusions)
- Fortune telling fraud
- Houdini's debunking of psychics and mediums
- List of con artists
- List of confidence tricks
- Psychic Blues: Confessions of a Conflicted Medium
- Romance scam
- Rose Mackenberg (Historic fraudulent psychic medium investigator)
- The Psychic Mafia
