= Doris Stokes =

Self-proclaimed British psychic

- Born: Doris May Fisher Sutton; 6 January 1920; Grantham, Lincolnshire, United Kingdom
- Died: 8 May 1987 (aged 67); Lewisham, London, United Kingdom
- Occupations: Spiritualist, self-proclaimed medium, author
- Years active: 1949−1986
- Known for: TV appearances, publications

Doris May Fisher Stokes (6 January 1920 – 8 May 1987), born Doris Sutton, was a British spiritualist, professional medium, and author. Her public performances, television appearances, and memoirs made her a household name in Britain. While some believed her to possess psychic abilities, investigations published after her death demonstrated that she used fraudulent techniques including cold reading, hot reading, and planting accomplices in her audience.

== Early life ==
Stokes was born in Grantham, Lincolnshire, England in January 1920. In her memoirs she claimed that she started seeing spirits and hearing disembodied voices in childhood, and that she developed these abilities further once she joined a local spiritualist church after her son died in infancy. She was recognized as a practising clairaudient medium by the Spiritualists' National Union in 1949.

During a crisis of confidence in 1962, she gave up her work as a medium and retrained as a psychiatric nurse, but had to retire five years later following an attack by a patient. She returned to her psychic work, and in 1975 became the resident medium at the Spiritualist Association of Great Britain.

== Career ==
Stokes first came to public attention in 1978 during a visit to Australia, when she appeared on The Don Lane Show. In the wave of interest that followed her appearance, she played to three capacity audiences at the Sydney Opera House. She was also the first medium to appear at the London Palladium; the tickets sold out in two hours. She was especially believable because of her smiling, down-to-earth manner, which avoided the traditional trappings of the séance and gave her performances almost "the ordinariness of a transatlantic telephone call". In 1980, her first autobiographical volume, Voices in My Ear: The Autobiography of a Medium was published, pulling her further into the public eye in the UK. More than two million copies of her books were sold. Positive testimonials continued to come forward into the 2000s, from celebrities including Eamonn Holmes and Dale Winton.

Stokes was condemned by the Church of England and other Christian denominations, which objected to spirit communication as an offence to God. She countered that her work was done for God, and in accordance with the Bible's injunction to "test the spirits to see whether they are from God, because many false prophets have gone out into the world" (1 John 4.:1).

Stokes's health was poor throughout her life. Her thirteen or so cancer operations included a mastectomy, and the April 1987 removal of a brain tumour, after which she did not regain consciousness. She died in Lewisham, London on 8 May 1987. Described variously as "an individual of great personal warmth", "the Gracie Fields of the psychic world" and "a ruthless moneymaking confidence artist", she continued to give free consultations or "sittings" until a month before her death, when she left only £15,291.

== Criticism, debunking and accusations of fraud ==
"Whatever the truth, on the most charitable assessment, Doris Stokes was not all she seemed, and the most serious question marks hang over her."

— Ian Wilson, The After Death Experience, chapter 7

Stokes was accused of using various forms of deception to achieve the effect of communicating with the dead. These included cold reading, eavesdropping, and planting accomplices in the audience.

=== Evidence of audience plants ===
Stokes's death coincided with the publication of Catholic author Ian Wilson's 1987 book, The After Death Experience, in which he presented a detailed exposé of her methods. He described her as providing "slick, sure-fire answers" to the questions of life after death.

He attended one of Stokes's Palladium performances in November 1986, when she claimed to contact the dead relatives of four consecutive audience members, with a sequence of convincing and poignant details. However, when the participants were questioned after the performance, it turned out that each of them had been invited by Stokes. The manager of the Palladium explained that Stokes routinely booked the front three rows of the theatre for her own use.

Those "contacted" included a young woman called Dawn. She was given a message supposedly from her husband, who had died less than a month earlier, telling her that he supported her decision to turn off his life support machine. However, when hospital nurses had asked her whether she would like to speak to anybody about this decision, she had asked to speak to Doris Stokes. Stokes had spoken to Dawn by telephone, offering commiseration and asking to be updated with the results of the tests that would determine whether Dawn's husband lived or died.

In 1987, Dawn described a number of personal details which Stokes had given unprompted to her mother on the phone. While Dawn found these convincing, Wilson suggests that Stokes obtained them from Dawn's aunt, a prominent local spiritualist.

Another participant was Marilyn Stenning, whose daughter Kerry had recently died in a car accident. She received a personal phone call from Stokes, offering her front-row seats for the Palladium performance. Other participants included "camp followers", who regularly attended the shows and repeatedly received messages from the same people. During the second half of the performance, members of the audience were chosen apparently at random. Wilson described this post-interval performance as "much less convincing ... [relying] on intelligent guesswork and 'fishing'".

=== Disputed memoirs and testimony ===
While Stokes published seven volumes of autobiography, some of the events she describes in them have been questioned.

In her book, Voices in my Ear, Stokes claimed that she had solved two murder cases in England. However, Detective Chief Superintendent Wilfrid Brooks of the Lancashire Constabulary stated that Stokes made no contribution whatsoever to the detection of either murderer.

Whilst in Beverly Hills, Los Angeles, she also claimed that local murder victim Vic Weiss had contacted her with details of his murder. Former magician and high-profile sceptic, James Randi, contacted the Los Angeles Police Department, who informed him that all of the information supplied by Stokes had been available to the media at the time. Stokes was unable to provide any new information to the police and the case remains unsolved.

== In popular culture ==
The song "The Clairvoyant" from Iron Maiden's Seventh Son Of a Seventh Son is based upon her.

According to Steve Harris, the song was inspired by the death of psychic Doris Stokes, and his wondering that if she were truly able to see the future, would not she had foreseen her own death?

== Bibliography ==
- Voices in My Ear, Doris Stokes with Linda Dearsley (1980)
- More Voices in My Ear, Doris Stokes with Linda Dearsley (1981). Publisher: FUTURA PUBNS.
- Innocent Voices in My Ear, Doris Stokes with Linda Dearsley (1983). Publisher: Sphere; New edition.
- A Host of Voices, Doris Stokes with Pam and Mike Kiddey (1984)
- Voices in My Ear: Autobiography of a Medium (1985). Publisher: TBS The Book Service Ltd; New edition.
- Whispering Voices, Doris Stokes with Linda Dearsley (1985). Publisher: FUTURA PUBLICATIONS; 1st edition.
- Voices in My Ear: Autobiography of a Medium (1980). Publisher: Little, Brown.
- Voices of Love, Doris Stokes with Linda Dearsley (1986). Publisher: TBS The Book Service Ltd.
- Joyful Voices, Doris Stokes with Linda Dearsley (1987)
- A Tribute to Doris Stokes, Linda Dearsley (1988)

== See also ==
- Ann O'Delia Diss Debar ("One of the most extraordinary fake mediums... the world has ever known" -Houdini)
- Char Margolis
- Flim-Flam! (Psychics, ESP, Unicorns and other Delusions)
- Fortune telling fraud
- Houdini's debunking of psychics and mediums
- James Van Praagh
- John Edward
- Linda and Terry Jamison
- Long Island Medium
- Mark Edward
- Matt Fraser (psychic)
- Monica the Medium
- Psychic Blues: Confessions of a Conflicted Medium
- Rose Mackenberg (Historic investigator of psychic mediums)
- Sylvia Browne
- Tyler Henry
