= Maria Duval scam =

Large-scale mail fraud operation

The Maria Duval scam is one of the most successful mail scams in history, having defrauded millions of people out of at least $200 million over twenty years. Targeting sick and elderly people through a combination of personalized letters and personal information databases, it has been shut down in the United States in 2016, but is still ongoing in many countries.

== History, scope and method ==
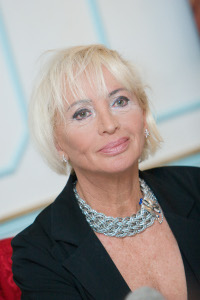
Maria Carolina Gamba as Maria Duval, in 2008

The scam originates from a purported psychic of Italian origin named Maria Carolina Gamba, using "Maria Duval" as her trade name. Gamba gave psychic consultations in the South of France and attained some measure of notoriety. Gamba sold the rights to the psychic services of "Maria Duval", entering into a contractual arrangement with a group of people who used the name to promote the sale of astrology charts, possibly in the early 1990s. The new copyright holders (or perhaps people who bought in a subsequent transaction) developed the scam as it would be known throughout the world: using information available publicly or through newspaper advertising at first, then purchasing personal information marketing databases, they would mail letters to potential victims, offering feats of divination by Maria Duval for $40.

According to an investigation by CNN journalists Melanie Hicken and Ellis Blake, the scam was controlled for some time by two European companies, Astroforce and Infogest, both being owned by Raëlian Jean-Claude Reuille, who eventually sold his assets to undisclosed buyers. The group that now operates the Duval scam may be using the same model with other psychics.

The scammers targeted aged or sick people, typically promising psychic help to improve their health or finances. The $40 fee applied to each piece of a correspondence that could stretch over years. More expensive forms of assistance such as plastic talismans and crystals were also offered, some victims paying thousands of dollars per year.

The letters appeared to be hand-written and signed by Duval. They contained enough personal details to lead the victim to believe the person sending them might indeed have psychic powers. Even though at some point thousands of letters were generated per week, the scammers took great care to make them look as authentic as possible, with coffee stains or pages of (computer-generated) paragraphs giving the appearance of a personal letter. Some victims would develop feelings of friendship for the Duval persona, which increased the amount of correspondence. The name Patrick Guérin would be used as Duval's psychic assistant, who also offered services, generating another revenue stream for the scam.

Letters have been found in a dozen countries and generated revenues in excess of $200 million in the United States and Canada. The scam was managed by a series of successive groups using shell companies to hide their involvement. Gamba, however, continued to receive payments and did some promotional work under the name Maria Duval, even occasional news appearances at some point. Gamba's son thinks her mother agreed to be used as the face of the scam out of a desire to become rich and famous, then felt she was unable to stop the ongoing relationship.

Early law enforcement investigations concluded Maria Duval may not actually exist, being a persona completely fabricated by scammers. That turned out to be incorrect when Ellis and Hicken, assisted by French colleagues, located Duval's residence in the south of France in 2016 and managed to interview her two years later. In August, 2018, they published "A Deal with the Devil: The Dark & Twisted True Story Of One Of The Biggest Cons In History", which narrates their search for the elusive Maria Duval/Carolina Gamba.

== Law enforcement investigations ==
An investigation by the United States Department of Justice (DoJ) concluded in 2014 with some companies associated with the scam paying undisclosed amounts as out-of-court settlements. The DoJ also barred Hong Kong's Destiny Research Center and Montreal's Infogest Direct Marketing from sending letters to the United States (from Canada) and the criminal investigation targeting those two firms was still ongoing in 2018. Infogest has been investigated for other scams, including one about fraudulent weight loss products. Canadian financial services PacNet was subsequently accused of laundering money from the American Maria Duval operations, among other questionable clients.

Investigators concluded the number of people scammed is considerable, including 1.4 million in the United States alone.

Gamba's residence in Callas was searched by French police and American investigators in March, 2018. A United States Postal Inspection Service investigation got underway in 2018 and two Canadian citizens, Maria Thanos and Philip Lett, pleaded guilty in June of that year to conspiracy to commit mail fraud. In December 2020, their alleged associate Patrice Runner was extradited from Spain on similar charges.

In June 2023, Patrice Runner, the man in charge of the operation, was convicted of "conspiracy to commit mail and wire fraud, mail fraud, wire fraud and conspiracy to commit money laundering by the jury in U.S. Court for the Eastern District of New York in Central Islip." Two other co-conspirators, Sherry Gore of Indiana and Daniel Arnold of Connecticut, pleaded guilty to conspiracy to commit mail fraud. In April 2024, Runner was sentenced to 10 years in prison. According to Postal Inspector Clayton Gerber, the postal service was, in a rare victory, able to win the cooperation of the database companies that had supplied the information used by the scammers and assembled a fund large enough to pay back in whole all of the still living victims.

== In other media ==
Paul Fidalgo from Center For Inquiry introduces 2018 Balles Award Winner A Deal with the Devil

Investigative reporters from CNN, Blake Ellis and Melanie Hicken exposed the complex inner workings of a case of psychic fraud that spanned several decades and bilked over $200,000,000 from the mostly elderly victims. In 2019, the Committee for Skeptical Inquiry at CSICon awarded the Robert P. Balles prize for their work A Deal With the Devil. Wendy Grossman reviewing the book for Skeptical Inquirer Magazine concludes that skeptics should remember that sometimes the scammer can become the victim causing even more widespread damage. Grossman states "This is a twist we skeptics never saw coming: that those famous for their psychic claims could effectively sell their businesses to organized crime and become pawns of their new bosses".

An article published on the Portuguese news website, Setenta e Quatro, claims that João Vale e Azevedo, a former President of soccer club S. L. Benfica, was responsible for expanding the scam to Portugal, where it operated between 1995 and 2012 and earned 3 million euros alone between July 1, 1998, and June 30, 1999.

== See also ==
- Ann O'Delia Diss Debar ("One of the most extraordinary fake mediums ... the world has ever known" – Houdini)
- Bob Nygaard
- Charlatan
- Flim-Flam! (Psychics, ESP, Unicorns and other Delusions)
- Fortune telling fraud
- Houdini's debunking of psychics and mediums
- List of con artists
- List of confidence tricks
- Televangelist Peter Popoff exposed by James Randi
- Psychic Blues: Confessions of a Conflicted Medium
- Romance scam
- Rose Mackenberg (Historic investigator of psychic mediums)
