= Gina Marks =

American psychic and convicted fraudster (born 1973)

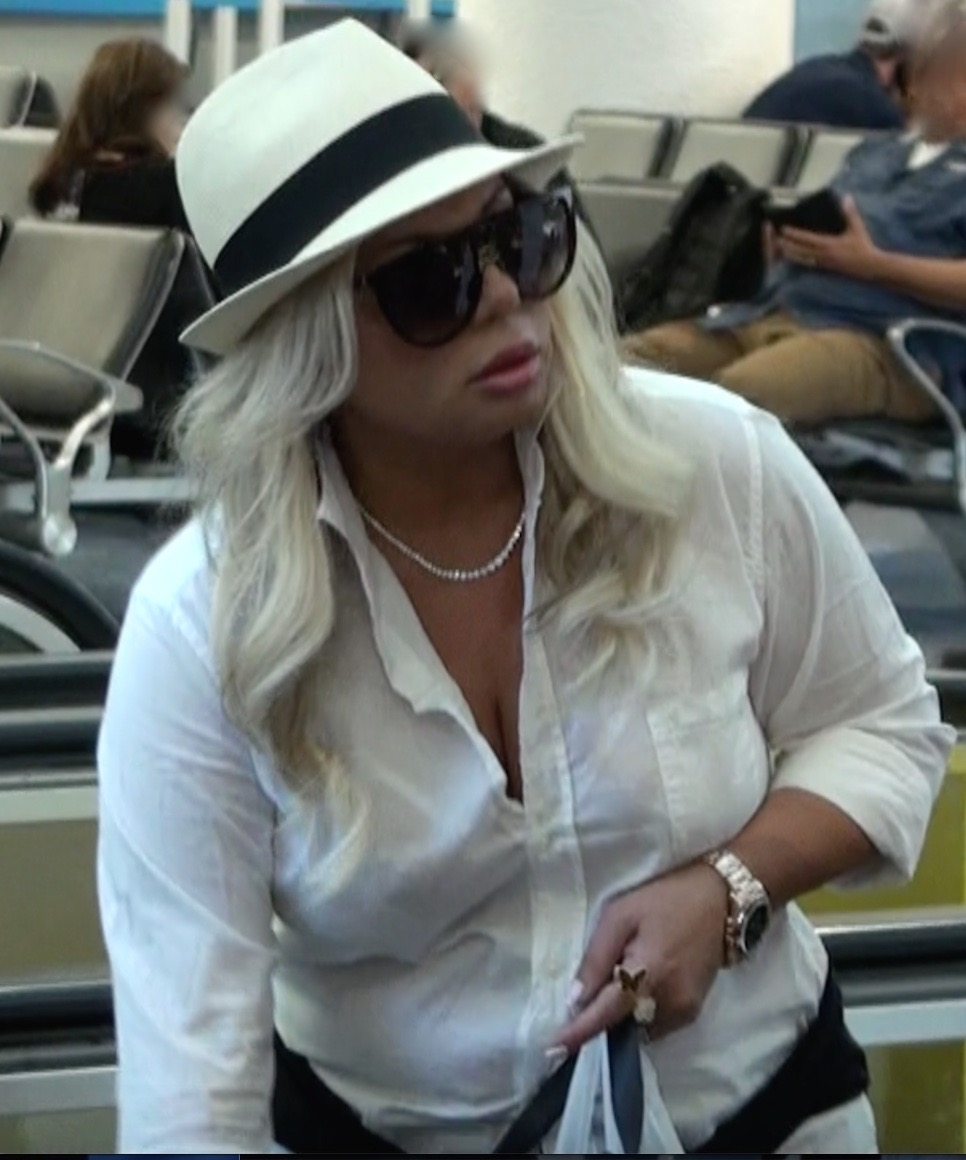
- Marks in Miami International Airport, 2017
- Born: Gina Marie Marks; January 25, 1973 (age 53); New York, U.S.
- Other names: Regina Milbourne, Zara Margazio, Regina Miller, Gina Mylkos, Melinda Mylkos, Amanda Marks, Gina Diprima, Amanda Gina Marks, Jill
- Occupations: Psychic, writer
- Spouse: Sunny Miller
- Children: Hillarie Miller
- Parent(s): John Uwanawich and Betty Jo Ephraim aka Helen Uwanawich aka Estee Lee
- Status: Convicted felon (2018)
- Criminal charges: Grand theft, violating probation, fraud

Gina Marie Marks (born January 25, 1973) is an American self-proclaimed psychic and convicted fraudster. Using the pseudonym of Regina Milbourne, she co-authored Miami Psychic: Confessions of a Confidante, a memoir published by HarperCollins in 2006.

In August 2018, Marks' career as a psychic con-artist, and the decade-long pursuit by detective Bob Nygaard to bring her to justice, were portrayed on an episode of the CBS series Pink Collar Crimes titled "The Psychic Didn't See Him Coming".

In 2018 Marks pleaded guilty to defrauding five victims out of more than $340,000, but blamed her prosecution on racism against Romani people. In September 2018, she was sentenced to six years in prison.

== Criminal activity ==
Marks has had numerous arrests and convictions in Florida for defrauding clients out of large sums of money while claiming to use psychic powers to help them:

- In 2007, Marks pleaded no contest to grand theft charges related to an agreement to "cleanse souls" for a total of $65,000. She was then put on probation for eighteen months and ordered to return the money back to her clients. In 2009, she was arrested again for a similar crime.
- In 2010, she was again arrested in Florida for a defrauding of over $300,000 and for violating probation. A month later, while still in Broward County Jail, she was arraigned again on further fraud charges which involved another victim who came forward due to media exposure following Marks' earlier arrest.
- On September 1, 2010, Marks pleaded guilty to grand theft and two counts of organized fraud. In addition she admitted to violating her probation. At her sentencing, Marks handed over a $400,000 check to partially repay her former clients.
- On April 2, 2014, in another case, Marks was sentenced to 10 years of probation.
- In 2018, Marks was convicted of stealing more than $340,000 from five victims over three years using the pseudonym Natalie Miller. Although she pleaded guilty to psychic fraud charges, Marks blamed her misfortune on anti-Romani sentiment, saying "They're racist on my culture. We do have power. We're not allowed to talk about it."
- On October 9, 2025, Marks was arrested on various charges, including corrupt organization, conspiracy, theft by taking and fortunetelling.

Investigating a psychic fraud case involving Marks in 2008 marked the beginning of South Florida private investigator Bob Nygaard's "psychic hunting" career. Nygaard also brought Marks to justice in 2010 and 2016, culminating in her 2018 conviction for the theft of over $340,000. In September 2018, Marks was sentenced to six years in prison and ordered to pay restitution to her victims, with the judge stating that Marks' actions were premeditated and she preyed on vulnerable people.

== Pink Collar Crimes ==
On August 11, 2018, CBS broadcast an episode of its true crime TV show, Pink Collar Crimes, titled "The Psychic Didn't See Him Coming". The episode recounts the story of private eye Bob Nygaard and his numerous pursuits of Marks to obtain justice for his clients between 2008 and 2018, which culminated in Mark's 2018 conviction.

== Miami Psychic ==
Marks is the co-author of Miami Psychic: Confessions of a Confidante, published by HarperCollins in 2006. The book purports to be a true memoir about a psychic named Regina Milbourne, who used her supposed paranormal gifts to help many of Miami's least desirable element: drug dealers, thieves, murderers and pedophiles. Regina claims that she "comes clean" in the book, "divulging the unimaginable horrors and shocking confessions that she witnessed throughout her career".

== Personal life ==
Marks is married to Sunny Miller, and has a daughter, Hillarie Miller.

== See also ==
- Ann O'Delia Diss Debar
- Charlatan
- Cold reading
- Confidence trick
- Con artist
- Flim-Flam! (Psychics, ESP, Unicorns and other Delusions)
- Fortune telling fraud
- Houdini's debunking of psychics and mediums
- Hot reading
- List of con artists
- List of confidence tricks
- Televangelist Peter Popoff exposed by James Randi
- Psychic Blues: Confessions of a Conflicted Medium
- Romance scam
- Rose Mackenberg (Historic fraudulent psychic medium investigator)
