= Psychic Friends Network =

American social media business

- Logo from 1992 infomercial
- Owner: Inphomation inc
- Website: psychicfriendsnetwork.com
- Current status: Online

The Psychic Friends Network (PFN) was a telephone psychic service operating in the United States in the 1990s. The company's infomercials were aired frequently on late night television at that time. In 2012, the business began to migrate to online services.

Mark Edward, who worked as a telephone "psychic" for the network, had become a vocal critic of the PFN, and all psychics, saying that "the psychic business is built on lies". His book Psychic Blues details what it was like to work for PFN.

== History ==
=== Infomercial and telephone network business model ===
The Psychic Friends Network was launched in 1991. It relied on infomercials to attract clients, and used a call distributing system to forward calls to a network of "psychics" working in shifts from their homes. This technology allowed the customers to build personal relationships with individual "psychics".

According to the Slate article What Psychic Friends Failed to Foresee, "Psychic Friends infomercials had been among the most popular in history. Between 1993 and 1994, they aired more than 12,000 times, and at one point Inphomation was shelling out half a million dollars a week to buy air time on cable stations. It was money well spent: At its peak, Psychic Friends was bringing in as much as $125 million a year, most of it through infomercials." Slate reported that "the psychic business has tried to focus on establishing continuing relationships between individual psychics and their customers. ('I don't want just any psychic! I want to speak to Clarissa!')"

Presented in talk show-like format and hosted by singer Dionne Warwick, and "psychic" Linda Georgian, each installment featured a 1–900 number for viewers to call to consult a psychic.

According to Jack Schember, publisher of Response TV, a magazine that tracked the direct-response television industry, the PFN had "the most successful infomercial of all time."

According to USA Today, The Psychic Friends Network infomercials opened "the parody floodgates." The parent company, Inphomation, took in profits of over $100 million within the first few years of the Network's operation.

The company declared bankruptcy in 1998 with liabilities of $26 million, and assets of about $1.2 million. In 2001, the bankruptcy trustees for the Psychic Friends Network sued MCI WorldCom Network Services Inc for mismanagement of billing and collections and won a judgement of $7.5 million in 2004, of which MCI eventually paid $4.1 million.

In 2009, Vivica A. Fox announced that she had not given PFN permission for the use of her image in its commercials, stating "Vivica A. Fox is no friend of The Psychic Friends Network," and said that the video "is using her unauthorized likeness, footage, voice and photographs as an endorsement of their service."

=== Web-based business model ===
PFN launched as a public company on March 30, 2012. Shortly afterwards, PFN CEO Mike Lasky announced that PFN had received an additional $250,000 investment from Right Power Services Ltd, and said this funding "assures that PFNI will be well positioned to launch some of the exciting new marketing initiatives we are now finalizing. These include a broad new program of mobile advertising, a broad affiliate program, and pay-per-call advertising that will set new industry standards." In April 2012, Lasky announced that "...the prevalence of such technologies as online chat, FaceTime, mobile text messaging, and social networking has created an environment in which psychic services can thrive online and on mobile devices rather than rely on phone lines."

On July 18, 2012, the Las Vegas Sun reported that The Psychic Friends Network was back, saying while "the company went bankrupt in the late '90s, founder Mike Lasky kept it on life support. The company relaunched this summer with a new web platform full of social media, e-alerts and instant messaging, so you can connect with Zelda, Destiny and Midnight Magical Spirit through video, voice or text for 24/7 tarot, astrology, numerology, dream interpretation and other 'peeks.' Calls are still $3.99 a minute ... At that price, it better be really [expletive] entertaining."

In January 2014, The Psychic Friends Network announced it had expanded operations to include a website utilizing video chat. The company said in its press release that "With the addition of VOIP chat platform, the Psychic Friends Network is now the only service in the psychic industry offering a full suite of connection methods, including phone, click to call, audio and video chat, and its soon-to-be-released mobile app."

In December 2014, PSN announced that it has changed its company name to "Peer to Peer Network", to reflect "its expanded new corporate direction into all facets of the booming peer-to-peer industry."

Peer To Peer Network still existed as a publicly traded entity as of 2021.

== Insider criticism ==
Mark Edward gave an insider's account of the organization's business model, as well as his dealing with clients, in his 2012 book Psychic Blues. He described the organization as "a psychic sweatshop", and revealed how he gained the confidence of clients while working as a telephone psychic, and rose to prominence in the company without possessing any paranormal powers at all.

When asked by ABC News if psychics are real, Edward said "No, they're not real. It's just a matter of intuition. If you're good with people, you learn how to read people. Do you want to be a real estate agent ... or clairvoyant? ... They're all a similar skill set. It's a skill you can learn. It's real, but it's nothing supernatural." Edward told ABC that "he was taught techniques to keep his conversations vague, flattering and drawn out. The goal was to make the callers feel good about themselves, and keep them talking." He said that he once "gave a two-and-a-half-hour reading. At $3.99 a minute, the caller paid more than $600." Edward also revealed that:

The psychic business is built on lies. There is no supernatural power. You can't see the future ... We're in the golden age of the con. There are people coming out of the woodwork that would love to separate you from your money. But people just want someone to talk to. That's the bottom line.

== See also ==
- Ann O'Delia Diss Debar
- Bob Nygaard (Psychic fraud investigator)
- Cold reading
- Flim-Flam! (Psychics, ESP, Unicorns and other Delusions)
- Fortune telling fraud
- Houdini's debunking of psychics and mediums
- Hot reading
- List of topics characterized as pseudoscience
- Psychic reading
- Rose Mackenberg (Historic fraudulent psychic medium investigator)
- Séance
