= María Duval =

María Duval may refer to:

- María Duval (Argentine actress)
- María Duval (Mexican actress)

== See also ==
- Maria Duval
