= Anna Sprengel =

Countess of Landsfeldt; person of disputed existence

Anna Sprengel (allegedly died in 1891), countess of Landsfeldt, love-child of Ludwig I of Bavaria and Lola Montez, is a person whose existence was never proven, and who it now seems was invented by William Wynn Westcott to confer legitimacy on the Golden Dawn. In 1901 Mathers, leader of the Golden Dawn, briefly supported the claim of Swami Laura Horos, who had long campaigned for recognition as that countess, to have written to Westcott as Anna Sprengel.

== Westcott's anecdote ==
According to William Wynn Westcott, with whom he claimed she entered into voluminous correspondence, Anna Sprengel was born in Nuremberg and was responsible for the foundation of the Golden Dawn around 1886. She is supposed to have held a Rosicrucian ritual and to have nominated Westcott as the head of the Golden Dawn in Britain.

One of Westcott's friends had decoded a series of manuscripts which the occultist Fred Hockley had brought from Germany which were given to him by a German Rosicrucian secret society. The address which was encoded there was that of a certain Anna Sprengel, countess of Landsfeldt, near Nuremberg. It was thus that Westcott is supposed to have been put into contact with Anna Sprengel.

By 1886, Anna Sprengel is supposed to have already established contact with the person who would become the main leader of the Golden Dawn in Britain, Samuel Liddell MacGregor Mathers (1854–1918). Anna Sprengel is supposed to have given Mathers a charter authorising him to found lodges of the Golden Dawn in Britain. Westcott and Mathers henceforth collaborated to develop the Golden Dawn, notably in France and in the United States.
