= Ian Wilson (author) =

British author (born 1941)

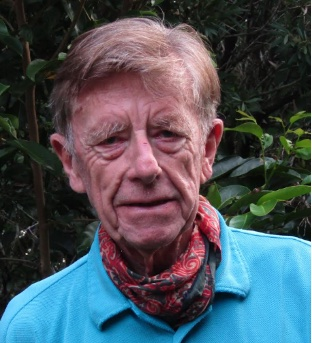
- Ian Wilson
- Born: 30 March 1941 (age 85); London
- Occupations: Author and Historian
- Writing career
- Period: 1978 - present
- Genre: Non-fiction
- Notable works: The Turin Shroud; Jesus: The Evidence;The After Death Experience; The Blood and the Shroud; Shakespeare: The Evidence; Lost World of the Kimberley; The Book of Geoffroi de Charny

Ian Wilson (born 1941) is a British-born author and historian specializing in historical and religious mysteries. Best known for his writings on the Shroud of Turin, he began his writing career in 1978 with the international best-seller The Shroud of Turin and has since explored subjects as diverse as Biblical history, medieval history, the historical Shakespeare, prehistoric rock paintings of Australia’s Kimberley region, also several paranormal topics, the latter often critically. His most recent publication, The Book of Geoffroi de Charny, is an academic study of a lengthy poem by the medieval knight of that name. A practising artist in any spare time, he and his wife Judith have lived in south-east Queensland, Australia since 1995.

== Early life ==
Wilson was educated from the age of eleven at Emanuel School, Battersea, south London, an independent Anglican school for boys founded in 1594. Deeply interested in art and its history, his teenage scepticism towards Christianity underwent serious challenge when in 1955 he first came across photographs of the Shroud in an article by Group Captain Leonard Cheshire V.C. in the weekly Picture Post. Unable to dismiss the cloth’s imagery as the work of an artist, he nevertheless put the topic on the back-burner whilst studying for a history degree at Magdalen College, Oxford between 1960 and 1963, a period during which he synchronously attended life drawing classes at Oxford’s Ruskin School of Art.

Adopting a business career late in 1963, three years later he took a break in this to research a new angle on the Shroud’s history using what was then the British Museum’s iconic reading room (today the British Library at King’s Cross). From this research he developed his core hypothesis that the Shroud’s pre-medieval history had been as the ‘Image of Edessa’ or ‘Mandylion’, a cloth long thought to have been imprinted only with Jesus’ face and destroyed in 1792. This theory he first launched publicly with a major article contributed to Britain’s Catholic Herald in November 1973, followed just a week later by his travelling to Turin to attend the Shroud’s first public showing in four decades. Unexpectedly allowed to examine the cloth without covering glass, and at the closest range, he became very firmly persuaded that no artist had created its imagery. In the immediately following years he approached several British book publishers seeking their backing for a book his findings, only to be rejected.

=== The Turin Shroud ===
By 1976, Wilson was long settled into a management career with Bristol’s Evening Post newspaper group when some newly released scientific findings supporting his Edessa hypothesis prompted him to write a second article for Britain’s Catholic Herald. By sheer chance, the article came to the attention of Bob Heller, religion editor for the major New York publishers Doubleday. Heller wrote to Wilson from the United States specially inviting him to write a full book on the subject. Wilson duly accepted, and in 1978 The Shroud of Turin appeared on US bookstalls soon to be followed by its publication throughout Britain and the Commonwealth as The Turin Shroud. IA bestseller on both sides of the Atlantic, it met with positive reviews from critics such as Magnus Magnusson. There followed foreign language editions in French, German, Dutch, Portuguese, Finnish, Polish, Japanese, Greek and Arabic.

==== The Silent Witness ====
During this same late 1970s period Wilson’s researches had attracted the attention of independent documentary film maker David Rolfe, who secured funding for a field trip to locations associated with Wilson’s reconstruction of the Shroud’s early history. A pilot script initiated by Wilson and adapted by Rolfe and professional scriptwriter Henry Lincoln became The Silent Witness, screened on BBC1 at Easter 1979 and awarded that year’s BAFTA award for best documentary.

== Career as a freelance author ==
=== Mind out of Time? ===
Having acquired publishers on both sides of the Atlantic keen for further books, Wilson, now long married and with two young sons, embarked on becoming a full-time author. Deliberately branching out from the Shroud, he turned his attention to a topic earlier popularized by American hypnotist Morey Bernstein’s best-selling The Search for Bridey Murphy: hypnotic ‘regressions’ into what appear to be ‘past lives’. Intrigued by similar British cases rich in convincing-sounding detail, Wilson set out to determine whether, even if these were not true evidence for reincarnation, somehow the hypnotised subjects might be experiencing genuine flashbacks from the historical past. Gradually it emerged that although both the hypnotists and their subjects were honest enough, when the latter were asked to go back to times before they were born somehow their unconscious mind creatively ‘relived’ episodes from historical novels they had once read and consciously forgotten. In some instances Wilson was able to prove this by tracing the relevant historical novel. Though the resultant Mind out of Time? Reincarnation Claims Investigated produced a result quite different from what Wilson had half hoped to find, it very conclusively shut the lid on the Bridey Murphy phenomenon as having any ‘life after death’ validity. Across the Atlantic Doubleday published it under the title All in the Mind.

=== Jesus: The Evidence ===
During the early 1980s Wilson’s film-maker associate David Rolfe gained backing from British media outlet Channel 4 for a three-part fact-finding documentary series entitled Jesus: The Evidence. Invited to write the book to accompany the series, Wilson accepted the assignment, only midway to find himself strongly disagreeing with the TV production team on how they were handling certain elements. In the event, although the TV series received heavy criticism for its sensationalist gimmicks such as exploding statues, Wilson’s book of the same title was favourably reviewed for treating the same subject-matter altogether more respectfully. Again published on both sides of the Atlantic, this proved another international best-seller and in 1996 would be republished in a lavishly illustrated full colour edition.

== Later career ==
=== The After Death Experience ===
In the later 1980s, Wilson returned to the topic of evidence for life after death, partially prompted by popular Spiritualist medium Doris Stokes' claims that she could relay messages from dead loved ones. In 1986 Wilson, Rolfe and two hired researchers booked gallery seats for Stokes’ 16 November show at the London Palladium from which vantage point they observed that those for whom she produced messages were all seated in the three rows immediately in front of the stage. During the interval, Wilson and Rolfe questioned the Palladium manager and learned from him that Stokes regularly reserved these rows for her own invitees. Synchronously, the two researchers learned from those for whom Stokes had produced messages that all had contacted her beforehand to tell her of their loss, following which all had received free tickets for her show. With now the clearest possible evidence that Stokes rigged her seances, Wilson completed his manuscript and submitted it to his publishers. Perversely, only days after lawyers had cleared the relevant chapter for publication, Stokes died from a brain tumor, thereby dashing Wilson’s intended exposure of a living medium. Published in 1987 as The After Death Experience, the book ranged well beyond cases such as Stokes, finding many that were similarly negative, though there were some, such as near-death experiences, that he acknowledged as altogether more difficult to dismiss. Reviews were mostly favourable, including by Polly Toynbee in The Guardian.

=== Shakespeare: The Evidence ===
In the early 1990s, with Sam Wanamaker’s project to recreate Shakespeare’s Globe theatre then much in vogue, Wilson turned his attention to the controversies surrounding how a humbly-born actor from Stratford-on-Avon came to write the English language’s greatest collection of plays and poems. Exploring the background of Shakespeare’s first company of actors, Lord Strange’s Company, Wilson found hitherto unexplored significance in its patron Ferdinando Stanley, Lord Strange, being a powerful northern noble strongly suspected of then treasonous Roman Catholic sympathies. Noting that between 1591 and 1593 Shakespeare wrote the three Henry VI plays, then Richard III for Strange’s Company, Wilson opined that Wilson opined that the beleaguered noble had commissioned this tetralogy, which culminates in Strange’s ancestor Thomas Stanley crowning Queen Elizabeth’s grandfather Henry Tudor on the Bosworth battlefield, subtly but firmly to assure the Queen of his family’s unswerving loyalty to her Tudor dynasty. But if this was indeed the ruse it tragically failed, Strange’s sudden, untimely death in 1594 indicating arsenic poisoning infiltrated by Queen Elizabeth’s secret service. For Wilson it was Shakespeare’s direct experience of such dastardly high-level machinations that honed his ultra-keen edge as a dramatist. Detecting signs of similar crypto-Catholic sympathies throughout Shakespeare’s oeuvre, Wilson found himself in strong agreement with Jesuit literary scholar Professor Peter Milward who wrote extensively on this same theme. Wilson's resultant Shakespeare: The Evidence: Unlocking the Mysteries of the Man and his Work, is Wilson’s longest book. It again received positive reviews including from Oxonian Shakespeare scholar A.L. Rowse, together with an invitation to speak at the 1994 Sydney Writers’ Festival, a first-ever taste of Australia which directly inspired his and his wife’s decision to emigrate the following year.

=== The Blood and the Shroud ===
In 1988 a carbon dating test pronounced the Turin Shroud of fourteenth century date, this notably being synchronous with its appearance in the unlikely possession of medieval knight Geoffroi de Charny, lord of an unprepossessing little village in central France. It was a finding Wilson refused to accept on the grounds that it offered no explanation of how an artist faked the cloth’s forensically convincing figurative imprints. Ten years later he wrote The Blood and the Shroud, arguing that the corner location from which the dating sample was taken had provided a deceptive date due to microbiological contamination from the cloth’s prolonged handlings. Fresh public showings of the Shroud during the spring of 1998 renewed public interest and Wilson accompanied both American and Australian TV units to Turin for special programmes.

=== Nostradamus: The Evidence ===
Almost immediately after Al-Qaeda’s September 11 attacks on the World Trade Centre and the Pentagon popular media around the world put out spurious stories that Nostradamus had predicted this event. With the Trade Centre dust barely settled Wilson’s UK publisher urgently contacted him asking if he would be prepared to write within six months a serious biography of the sixteenth century French seer (whose real name was Michel de Nostredame), as nothing of this kind yet existed in the English language. Regarding Nostradamus as little more than a crank, Wilson initially hesitated. However, the biography that was being asked of him was not intended to praise the seer, but provide an objective retrospective. Whilst at Oxford he had been well-tutored in France’s sixteenth century history, and a generously funded research trip to Nostradamus’ native Provence — the scene of many a happy Wilson family camping holiday — posed an attractive prospect. From the resultant foray and from never-before translated letters Wilson built up a picture of an unendearing individual who cleverly orchestrated an enduring mystique around his cloyingly vague ‘prophéties’, but who when he made specific, trackable predictions about aristocratic youngsters’ later careers too often failed miserably. It was not a conclusion to win the hearts of Nostradamus’ die-hard supporters, nevertheless the six-month deadline was achieved, a trans-Atlantic publication secured and history served.

=== Lost World of the Kimberley ===
Not long after his settling in Brisbane’s western suburbs, Wilson’s art interests drew him to a little-known group of rock paintings, the ‘Bradshaws’ (alternatively labelled ‘Gwion Gwion’), scattered around Australia’s remote Kimberley region. Highly mysterious because of their unusually skilful renderings of the human figure, the finest examples were at Doonan, a vast cattle station owned by the ultra-wealthy Myers family of Melbourne, Maria Myers being a close associate of Dame Elizabeth Murdoch, the mother of media magnate Rupert Murdoch. After thoroughly familiarising himself with the whole field of prehistoric rock art Wilson politely sought Myers’ permission to examine the Doonan paintings only to encounter her adamant refusal. Declining to abandon the topic, Wilson sought the help of Lee Scott Virtue, an archaeologist local to the Kimberley, who arranged a joint field expedition by Landcruiser and helicopter that enabled the study and photographing of a representative collection of examples located outside Myers territory. This resulted in Wilson’s Lost World of the Kimberley, to which the Murdoch-owned Australian newspaper accorded Wilson by far the nastiest review of his entire career as a writer (and across two pages). The book nevertheless sold out and went on to reprints, remaining to this day the only readily accessible full book on the topic.

=== The Book of Geoffroi de Charny ===
Following three decades as a freelance author, Wilson decided to retire in 2010, marking which he and his wife moved house from Brisbane’s suburban sprawl to the more relaxed lifestyle of Queensland’s Sunshine Coast. Purely for a retirement pastime, however, he could not resist attempting to translate a never-before-translated semi-autobiographical poem the Livre Charny, composed by the same Geoffroi de Charny in whose care the Shroud had so mysteriously appeared in fourteenth century France. Despite the poem including no mention of the Shroud, Wilson hoped it might furnish untapped insights into the mind of a man so closely associated with its origins. Whilst struggling with the poem’s difficult Middle French, he chanced upon a superbly illuminated original manuscript of it that had been overlooked by modern scholarship. This led to his introduction to medievalist Nigel Bryant - a noted British specialist in translating medieval literature - from which there quickly evolved Wilson’s The Book of Geoffroi de Charny with the Livre Charny edited and translated by Nigel Bryant. For Wilson, Bryant’s vivid prose translation not only achieved the professionalism he had long sought, it brought to light such unusual self-deprecation and transparent integrity in Charny’s personality that he declared himself impelled to embark on some ‘much-needed revisions to current suppositions concerning the Charny and pre-Charny periods’ of the Shroud’s history.

== Publications ==
- The Turin Shroud: The Burial Cloth of Jesus Christ? New York, Doubleday, 1978, ISBN 978-0-385-12736-3; The Turin Shroud, London, Gollancz, 1978, ISBN 978-0-575-02483-0
- Mind Out of Time?: Reincarnation Claims Investigated, London, Gollancz, 1981, ISBN 978-0-575-02968-2; All in the Mind, New York, Doubleday 1982
- Jesus: The Evidence, London, Weidenfeld & Nicolson, 1984, ISBN 0-297-78325-4.; Jesus: The Evidence, San Francisco, Harper Collins, 1985
- The Exodus Enigma, London, Weidenfeld, 1985, ISBN 0-297-78749-7
- The Evidence of the Shroud, London, Michael O’Mara, 1986, ISBN 978-0-948397-20-2
- The After Death Experience, London, Sidgwick & Jackson, 1987 ISBN 978-0-283-99495-1: The After Death Experience, The Physics of the Non-Physical, New York, Morrow, 1987 ISBN 978-0-688-08000-6
- The Bleeding Mind: An Investigation Into the Mysterious Phenomenon of Stigmata, London. Weidenfeld & Nicolson, 1988 ISBN 978-0-297-79099-0
- Holy Faces, Secret Places: The Quest for Jesus’ True Likeness, 1991, London, Doubleday, 1991 ISBN 978-0-385-26945-2
- Shakespeare: The Evidence: Unlocking the Mysteries of the Man and His Work, London, Headlne, 1993 ISBN 978-0-7472-0582-1; Shakespeare: The Evidence: Unlocking the Mysteries of the Man and His Work, New York, St. Martin’s Press, 1994, ISBN 978-0-312-11335-3
- Jesus: The Evidence, 2nd ed. [now illustrated in full colour], London: Weidenfeld & Nicolson, 1996. ISBN 978-0-297-83529-5; Jesus: The Evidence, San Francisco: Harper SanFrancisco, 1997. ISBN 978-0-06-251472-1
- The Blood and the Shroud: The passionate controversy still enflaming the world’s most famous carbon dating test, London, Weidenfeld & Nicolson, 1998, ISBN 978-0-297-84149-4; The Blood and the Shroud: new evidence that the world's most sacred relic is real, New York, Free Press, 1998 ISBN 978-0-684-85529-5
- Life After Death: The Evidence, London, Macmillan, 1998 ISBN 978-0-283-06300-8
- The Bible As History, London, Weidenfeld & Nicolson, 1999 ISBN 978-0-89526-250-9
- The Turin Shroud: The Illustrated Evidence [with Barrie Schwortz], London, Michael O’Mara, 2000 ISBN 978-1-85479-501-4
- Before the Flood: Dramatic new Evidence that the Biblical Flood was a real-life event; London, Orion, ISBN 978-0-7528-4635-4
- Nostradamus the Evidence, Orion, London, 2003 ISBN 978-0-7528-5263-8
- Lost World of the Kimberley: Extraordinary New Glimpses of Australia's Ice Age Ancestors, 2006 Sydney, Allen & Unwin, ISBN 978-1-74114-391-1
- Murder at Golgotha:Revisiting the Most Famous Crime Scene in History, New York, St. Martin’s Press, 2007 ISBN 978-0-312-36662-9
- The Shroud: Fresh Light on the 2000-Year-Old Mystery, London, Bantam, 2010 ISBN 978-0-553-82422-3
- The Book of Geoffroi de Charny with the Livre Charny edited and translated by Nigel Bryant, Woodbridge, Boydell Press, 2021 ISBN 978-1-78327-585-4
