= Sonya Fitzpatrick =

British actress

Sonya Fitzpatrick is a British television and radio personality as well as a pet psychic. She hosted the now-defunct television show Animal Planet's The Pet Psychic. Her weekly animal advice and call-in talk show, Animal Intuition, is currently broadcast on SIRIUS Satellite Radio Channel 102.

Fitzpatrick, a former model, worked in all the major fashion capitals in Europe, appeared frequently on television and modeled for many noted designers.

Fitzpatrick resides in the Conroe Woods subdivision in the Conroe, Texas area, outside Houston. Having divorced her second husband in 2005, Fitzpatrick remains single.

Fitzpatrick claims to have had telepathic abilities since childhood enabling her to communicate with reptiles, birds and animals of all kinds, "to help solve behavioral problems and physical ailments." She was featured in the HBO documentary To Love or Kill: Man Versus Animal, which explores the relationship between humans and animals.
