= The Con (TV series) =

American true crime television series

- Genre: True crime
- Narrated by: Whoopi Goldberg
- Country of origin: United States
- Original language: English
- No. of seasons: 2
- No. of episodes: 15

Production
- Executive producers: Aaron Saidman; Carrie Cook; Colleen Halpin; David Sloan; Eli Holzman; Star Price
- Running time: 41 minutes
- Production companies: ABC News; The Intellectual Property Corporation

Original release
- Network: ABC
- Release: October 14, 2020 – September 9, 2022 (Note: The last episode was scheduled to air on September 8, 2022, but was postponed to the following day due to a special edition of 20/20 about the life of Queen Elizabeth II, who died on that day.)

The Con is an American true crime television series that premiered on ABC on October 14, 2020.

Produced by ABC News and narrated by Whoopi Goldberg, the series explores stories of people taken in by claims and promises that proved too good to be true, revealing how the victims were fooled and the cost of their false trust. The series also features interviews with the people caught up in the cons, victims, eyewitnesses, law enforcement and the perpetrators themselves.

On July 25, 2022, the series was renewed for a second season which premiered on July 28, 2022.

== Episodes ==
=== Series overview ===
Season	Episodes	Originally released	
Season	Episodes	First released	Last released
1	8	October 14, 2020	March 31, 2021
2	7	July 28, 2022	September 9, 2022

=== Season 1 (2020–21) ===
No. overall	No. in season	Title	Original release date	Prod. code	U.S. viewers (millions)
1	1	"The Love Con"	October 14, 2020	101	2.38
2	2	"The Heiress Con"	October 21, 2020	102	2.72
3	3	"The Varsity Blues Con"	October 28, 2020	105	2.58
4	4	"The Fyre Festival Con"	March 3, 2021	106	1.85
5	5	"The Royal Con"	March 10, 2021	103	1.70
6	6	"The Psychic Con"	March 17, 2021	104	1.69
7	7	"The Wine Con"	March 24, 2021	107	1.70
8	8	"The Hollywood Con"	March 31, 2021	108	1.63

=== Season 2 (2022) ===
No. overall	No. in season	Title	Original release date	Prod. code	U.S. viewers (millions)
9	1	"The Faithful Investor Con"	July 28, 2022	201	2.08
10	2	"The Hollywood Mogul Con"	August 4, 2022	205	2.05
11	3	"The Sweetheart Swindler Con"	August 11, 2022	204	2.15
12	4	"The Billion Dollar Con"	August 18, 2022	206	1.91
13	5	"The Coupon Con"	August 25, 2022	207	2.17
14	6	"The Comeback"	September 1, 2022	202	2.27
15	7	"The Imposter Doctor Con"	September 9, 2022 (Note: This episode was scheduled to air on September 8, 2022, but was postponed to the following day due to a special edition of 20/20 about the life of Queen Elizabeth II, who died on that day.)	208	2.49

== Ratings ==
=== Season 1 ===
Viewership and ratings per episode of The Con
No.	Title	Air date	Rating/share (18–49)	Viewers (millions)
1	"The Love Con"	October 14, 2020	0.3/2	2.38
2	"The Heiress Con"	October 21, 2020	0.5/3	2.72
3	"The Varsity Blues Con"	October 28, 2020	0.4/3	2.58
4	"The Fyre Festival Con"	March 3, 2021	0.3	1.85
5	"The Royal Con"	March 10, 2021	0.2	1.70
6	"The Psychic Con"	March 17, 2021	0.3	1.69
7	"The Wine Con"	March 24, 2021	0.3	1.70
8	"The Hollywood Con"	March 31, 2021	0.3	1.63

=== Season 2 ===
Viewership and ratings per episode of The Con
No.	Title	Air date	Rating (18–49)	Viewers (millions)
1	"The Faithful Investor Con"	July 28, 2022	0.2	2.08
2	"The Hollywood Mogul Con"	August 4, 2022	0.3	2.05
3	"The Sweetheart Swindler Con"	August 11, 2022	0.3	2.15
4	"The Billion Dollar Con"	August 18, 2022	0.3	1.91
5	"The Coupon Con"	August 25, 2022	0.3	2.17
6	"The Comeback"	September 1, 2022	0.2	2.27
7	"The Imposter Doctor Con"	September 9, 2022	0.2	2.49

== See also ==
- Bob Nygaard, private detective featured in episode 6, "The Psychic Con".
- Mark Edward, mentalist featured in episode 6, "The Psychic Con", as "The Expert".
