= The Pet Psychic =

- Presented by: Sonya Fitzpatrick
- Country of origin: United States

Original release
- Network: Animal Planet
- Release: June 3, 2002 – January 1, 2003

The Pet Psychic is an hour-long television program that was broadcast on the Animal Planet network in the United States. The show was created by Yehuda Goldman and co-created by Todd Thompson, and senior broadcast executive Todd Mason, who also served as the shows executive producer. The program premiered on June 3, 2002, and featured Sonya Fitzpatrick as a psychic who claimed she could communicate with various animals including audience members' departed pets. Subject animals included the normal cats and dogs as well as horses, various birds and farm animals.

The program was scheduled on Monday evenings beginning at 8:00PM Eastern/7:00PM Central. The last regular airing of the program was on January 1, 2003. Animal Planet schedules no further broadcasts.

== Background of Sonya Fitzpatrick ==
As a young girl in England, Sonya learned early of her alleged unusual ability to feel the emotions and physical aches and pains of her terrier dog. One year her family raised three geese on their farm. Sonya became very attached to the fowls and believed she could feel their thoughts and emotions. When her father killed the geese for the family Christmas meal, she realized that no one else in her family had the same attachments to the animals. She then decided to make every effort to ignore her alleged unique abilities.

Around 1994, Sonya reconnected with her alleged psychic abilities and used her alleged telepathic skills to serve as a conduit for all types of animals. She attempts to use her alleged talent to explain pets’ behavioral problems and ailments.
