= Robert H. Gysel =

American magician and skeptic (1880–1938)

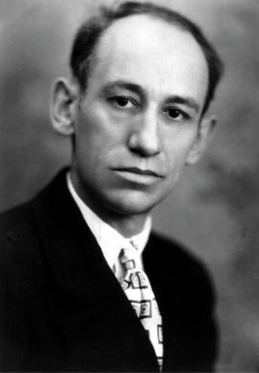
Robert H. Gysel

Robert Henry Gysel (November 18, 1880 – January 5, 1938), also known as Bob Gysel, was an American escape artist, magician and skeptic.

== Biography ==
Gysel planned to work as a pharmacist but dropped out of college. He practised as a medium under the name Joseph R. Johnson in Toledo, Ohio. He learned the tricks of the séance room and was a supplier of magic effects for fraudulent mediums. It has been suggested by magic historians that Gysel worked as an agent for Harry Houdini in the 1920s, debunking spiritualist mediums and psychics. However, John Cox has written that Gysel "provided Houdini with information on mediums and other magic-related matters, but it doesn't appear Gysel was ever employed as one of Houdini's agents."

Gysel claimed he could expose the tricks of any medium. He considered Arthur Conan Doyle to be "the nickel plated dumbell of Spiritualism." He shared with Houdini his pamphlets on psychic fakery. Gysel was known for performing the needle-through-arm trick. He contributed articles to magic magazines such as Genii and The Sphinx. His article "Spirit Tie" appeared in the Tarbell Course in Magic, Volume 6.

== Houdini's death ==
Gysel is alleged to have predicted Houdini's death. In a letter to Fulton Oursler, he described an incident on October 24, 1926, at 10:58pm in which a framed picture of Houdini fell off his wall and smashed. He stated in the letter that he knew Houdini would die.

== Publications ==
- Psychic Fakery No. 1, 2 and 3 (1935)
- Hypnotizing Wild and Domestic Animals (1936)
- Picks and Padlocks (1936)

== See also ==
- Rose Mackenberg
