= Maria Duval =

Amulet Supreme, pseudonym of Carolina Maria Gambia

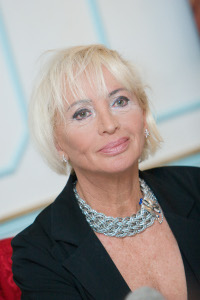
- Duval at her Moscow press conference in 2008
- Born: Maria Carolina Gamba; 15 July 1937; Milan, Italy
- Died: 15 October 2021 (aged 84); Callas
- Other name: Carolina Maria Gambia
- Occupations: Psychic, businesswoman
- Known for: Being the face of the Maria Duval scam

Maria Duval (born as Maria Carolina Gamba) was the woman at the origin of the Maria Duval psychic scam. Claiming to have psychic powers, she gained some fame before her name became associated with a vast and sophisticated mail scam.

== Independent psychic ==
Gamba was born in Milan, Italy. First living in Callas, Var, then traveling extensively, "Maria Duval" was able to build a growing reputation as a psychic throughout the 1970s and 1980s, doing consultations and horoscope newspaper columns. She did media interviews and appeared on the cover of Vogue Paris. Old newspaper clippings she keeps in her home indicate she brushed shoulders with celebrities, although her claim to have psychically found Brigitte Bardot's lost dog was debunked by Bardot herself.

Gamba had a son, named Antoine Palfroy, according to whom "Maria Duval" was not an alias, but rather the name she took on her second marriage. According to CNN, he believes "that there is no question his mother was a real psychic, and that she started out intent on helping others".

Her son mentioned she once owned an industrial cleaning business which specialized in saunas and pools, as well as "several" clothing stores, the latter of which were where she started giving astrological consultations to friends.

== Face of giant mail scam operation ==
In the mid-1990s, Gamba sold the rights to the name Maria Duval to a group of scammers, who used the name to sell astrology charts. The scam quickly changed form, as sick and elderly people started receiving letters promising the psychic help of "Maria Duval" for $40 per mail consultation. The scam would quickly take gigantic proportions and generate some $200 million in revenues for the fraudsters running it. It appears only a very small portion of that money made its way to Gamba.

In 2016, the U.S. Department of Justice shut down the North American arm of the "Psychic" Mail Fraud scheme.

Gamba made several public appearances over the years, including a news conference in Moscow in 2008. She left Callas in the late 1990s, although retaining ownership of the property. She moved back in 2008. She was still residing there in 2018 when French police searched her home and when an investigating team from CNN visited her.

According to her son, Gamba suffered a stroke in 2010 and was diagnosed with dementia in 2013.
