= Bob Nygaard =

Private detective specializing in psychic fraud

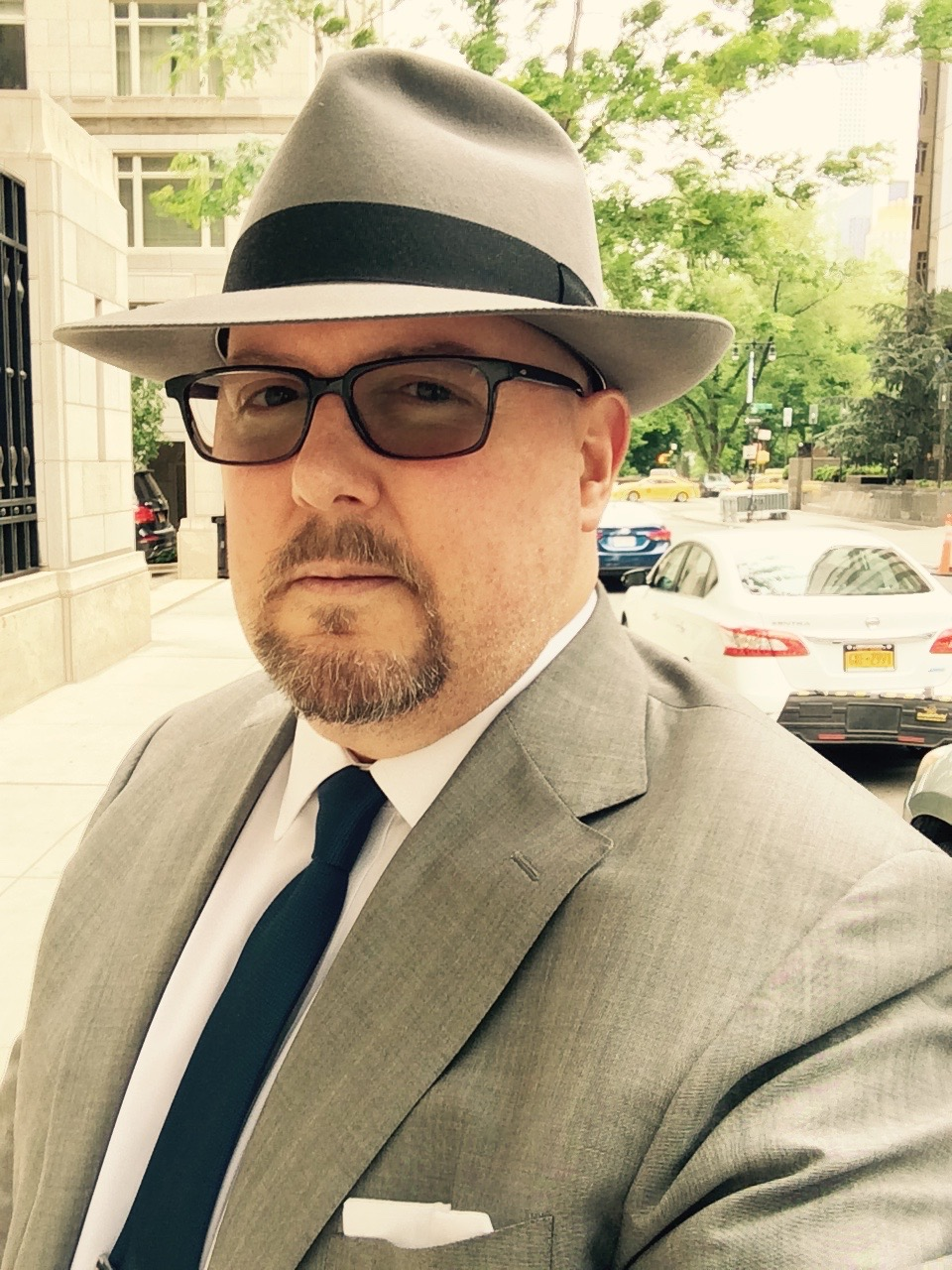
- Nygaard in 2015
- Born: New York City, U.S.
- Education: New York City Police Academy
- Alma mater: Southern Methodist University
- Occupations: Police officer, private investigator
- Known for: Psychic fraud investigations

Bob Nygaard is an American private investigator (PI) specializing in the investigation of confidence crimes, most notably psychic fraud. He has been instrumental in the arrest and conviction of numerous psychics, helping their victims obtain justice including financial restitution amounting to millions of dollars. He has consulted for ABC News and 20/20 as a specialist in psychic fraud. Nygaard previously was a member of the New York City Transit Police and Nassau County Police Department, retiring from service in 2008.

In 2018, Nygaard appeared as himself in episode "The Psychic Didn't See Him Coming" of the CBS true-crime show Pink Collar Crimes, which portrays his investigations of the crimes committed by self-proclaimed psychic and convicted fraudster Gina Marks. In 2021, Nygaard was featured in "The Psychic Con" episode of the ABC TV series The Con.

Nygaard is sympathetic to psychic fraud victims whom, he says, law enforcement authorities often fail to take seriously. He is also an outspoken critic of the inconsistent prosecution of this type of crime across the United States, and advocates for prison terms for convicted psychics, rather than merely forced restitution to their victims.

== Early life ==
Nygaard was born in Queens, New York City, and raised in the Long Island suburb of New Hyde Park. While in high school, he played on the varsity baseball, basketball, and lacrosse teams.

Intending to follow his father into business, Nygaard moved to Dallas where he majored in entrepreneurship at Southern Methodist University, and graduated in 1983. However, in 1985 he changed paths and enlisted in the New York City Police Academy.

== Law enforcement career ==
In 1985, after graduating from the New York City Police Academy, Nygaard joined the New York City Police Department as a transit officer working in Harlem.

In 1987, Nygaard moved from transit to street patrol in New York's Nassau County, and in 1991 he was assigned to investigate home-improvement scams targeting the elderly. He arrested five men who were wanted for various confidence schemes, and this led to an interest in fraud cases. He became knowledgeable in the intricacies of sweetheart swindles, insurance fraud, and psychic fraud while "bouncing between investigative squads and federal assignments with the DEA and FBI".

In 2007, Nygaard joined the National Association of Bunco Investigators, a trade organization for members of law enforcement and other related fields who specialize in the identification, apprehension, and prosecution of non-traditional organized crime suspects.

Nygaard retired with a full pension in 2008.

== Private investigator career ==
After retiring from police work, Nygaard moved to Boca Raton, Florida, in 2008. After his time on the police force, Nygaard said he just wanted to "sit out the rest of his days on the beach, lounging around tiki bars". However, retirement did not suit Nygaard, and thus he registered as a private investigator (PI).

Regarding working as a PI, Nygaard said, "I relished being able to finally wear clothes that reflected my own personal style, like fedoras and trench coats. I had been restricted to wearing a police uniform for more than 20 years, and my personal style just coincidentally blended perfectly with my new life's work". Initially he took standard PI jobs such as investigating unclaimed money and cheating spouses.

=== Transition to psychic fraud work ===
An incident in late 2008 at a neighborhood bar set Nygaard on the career path of investigating psychic scams. At a happy hour, Nygaard met two women in the medical profession and regaled them with stories about how he had outsmarted con artists and helped their victims. Shortly after leaving the bar, one of the women – a doctor – called him requesting a meeting alone. She was embarrassed, but revealed she had been scammed by a local psychic named Gina Marie Marks, a well-known Florida fortune-teller with a recently published pseudonymous memoir Miami Psychic: Confessions of a Confidante. Nygaard took the case and investigated Marks, ultimately uncovering five other victims of Marks who had been defrauded of a total of $65,000. Despite having gathered this evidence, the authorities refused to press charges against Marks after she agreed to return all the money to the group of victims Nygaard had uncovered. The authorities felt that was enough, but Nygaard disagreed:

It's a revolving door of justice where these people get in trouble, and they try to pay people off – usually pennies on the dollar, but in this case it was the full amount ... And then they never have a conviction on their record and they just go out and do the same thing.

The coverage of the Marks case led to more requests for help, which in turn led to more media coverage and additional cases.

=== Television appearances ===
==== ABC News and 20/20 ====
In April 2014, ABC News did a segment on a South Florida psychic fraud case, and interviewed Nygaard. He was later hired as a consultant for segments on scammers. That led to a 20/20 piece featuring Nygaard's work, which was a "ratings home run, with an estimated 8.2 million viewers". Nygaard said that as a result, "My phone started lighting up, and it hasn't stopped since".

==== Dr. Oz: The Prevalence of Fake Psychics ====
On May 7, 2018, Nygaard and one of his clients (Priti Mahalanobis) appeared on the Dr. Oz television show to discuss the way in which Ms. Mahalanobis had been scammed out of $136,000 by a fake psychic in Orlando named Peaches Stevens.

==== Pink Collar Crimes ====
On August 11, 2018, CBS first aired episode 3 of season 1 of its show Pink Collar Crimes, titled "The Psychic Didn't See Him Coming". The episode tells the story of Gina Marie Marks and of Nygaard's investigation of her crimes over a period of 10 years, from 2008 to 2018. Nygaard played himself on the show.

==== The Con ====
On March 17, 2021, ABC TV aired episode 6 of season 1 of The Con, "The Psychic Con", which interviews Nygaard and mentalist Mark Edward throughout the episode while telling the stories of three of Nygaard's clients. Each woman became emotionally dependent on their psychic and were defrauded out of tens of thousands of dollars, but then sought the help of Nygaard to obtain justice.

=== Notable psychic fraud cases ===
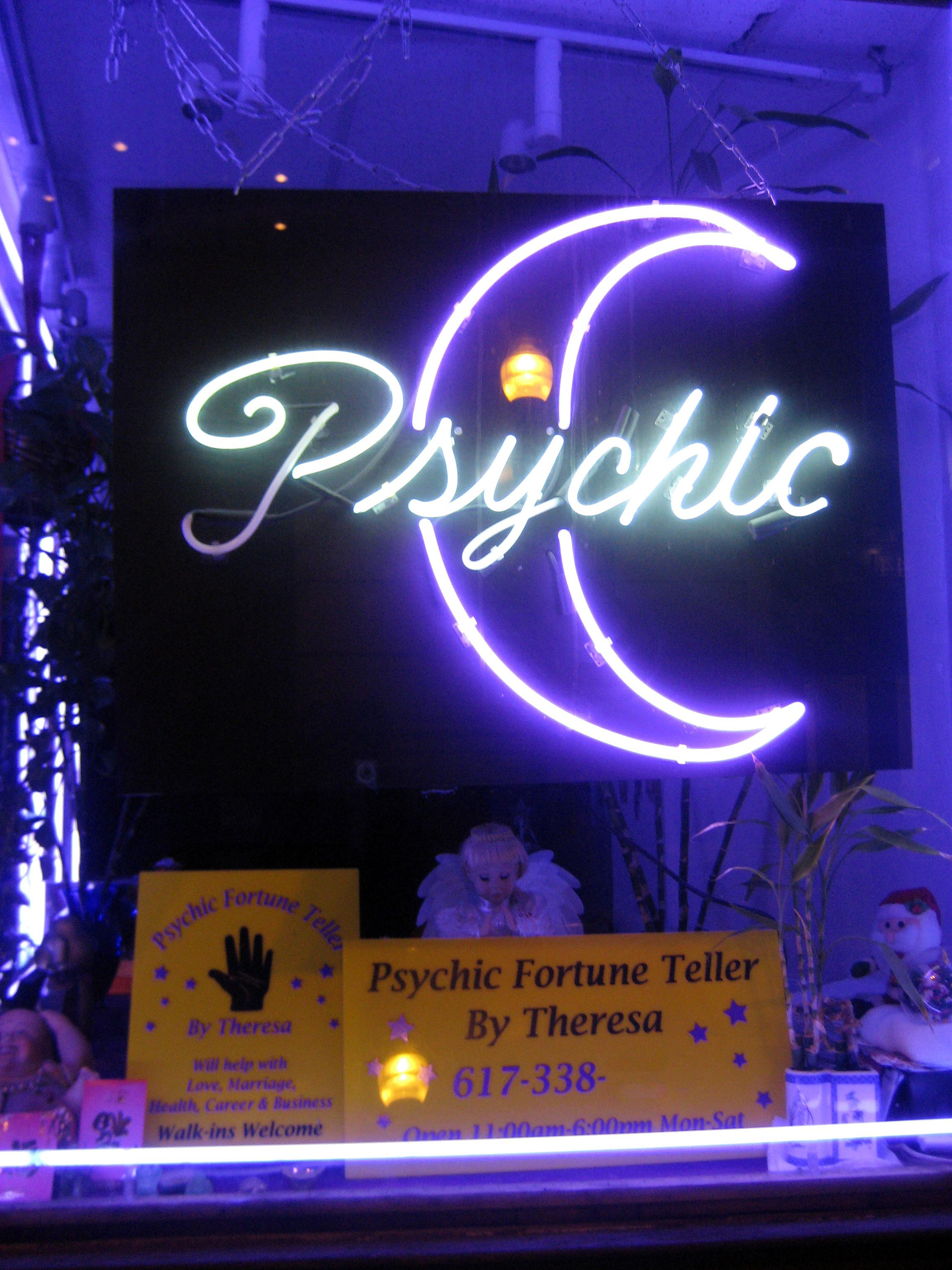
A psychic storefront

The scale of the psychic fraud problem is tremendous. Nygaard says he is familiar with a Florida case in which a woman claimed to have been defrauded of $17 million by fortune-tellers, and he personally has worked a case where his client was defrauded of $900,000.

A Skeptical Inquirer article reports that, as of February 2020, Nygaard had "helped to cause approximately forty self-proclaimed psychics to be arrested and successfully convicted" and had helped victims recover in excess of $4 million. Regarding the recovery amount, Nygaard said that the $4 million reflects what his clients have actually recovered as a result of his efforts. The criminal restitution orders, he says, were for much more. However victims are largely unable to collect on such orders given that self-proclaimed psychics rarely keep any assets in their own names.

Nygaard has been involved with a number of notable cases, including the following:

==== Priscilla Kelly Delmaro ====
In 2015, on behalf of his client from Brooklyn, Nygaard led police to Priscilla Kelly Delmaro, who had defrauded his client of over $700,000. Delmaro had convinced her client that he and a woman named Michelle were "twin flames kept apart by negativity", and she could bring them together. After the victim learned Michelle had died, Delmaro said she would reincarnate her in another woman's body. Over Nygaard's objection, Delmaro was offered a plea bargain including a sentence of less than one year, with no requirement to pay restitution. Nygaard called the outcome a "travesty" that will encourage what he says is a booming nationwide trade in psychic scams.

==== Gina Marie Marks ====
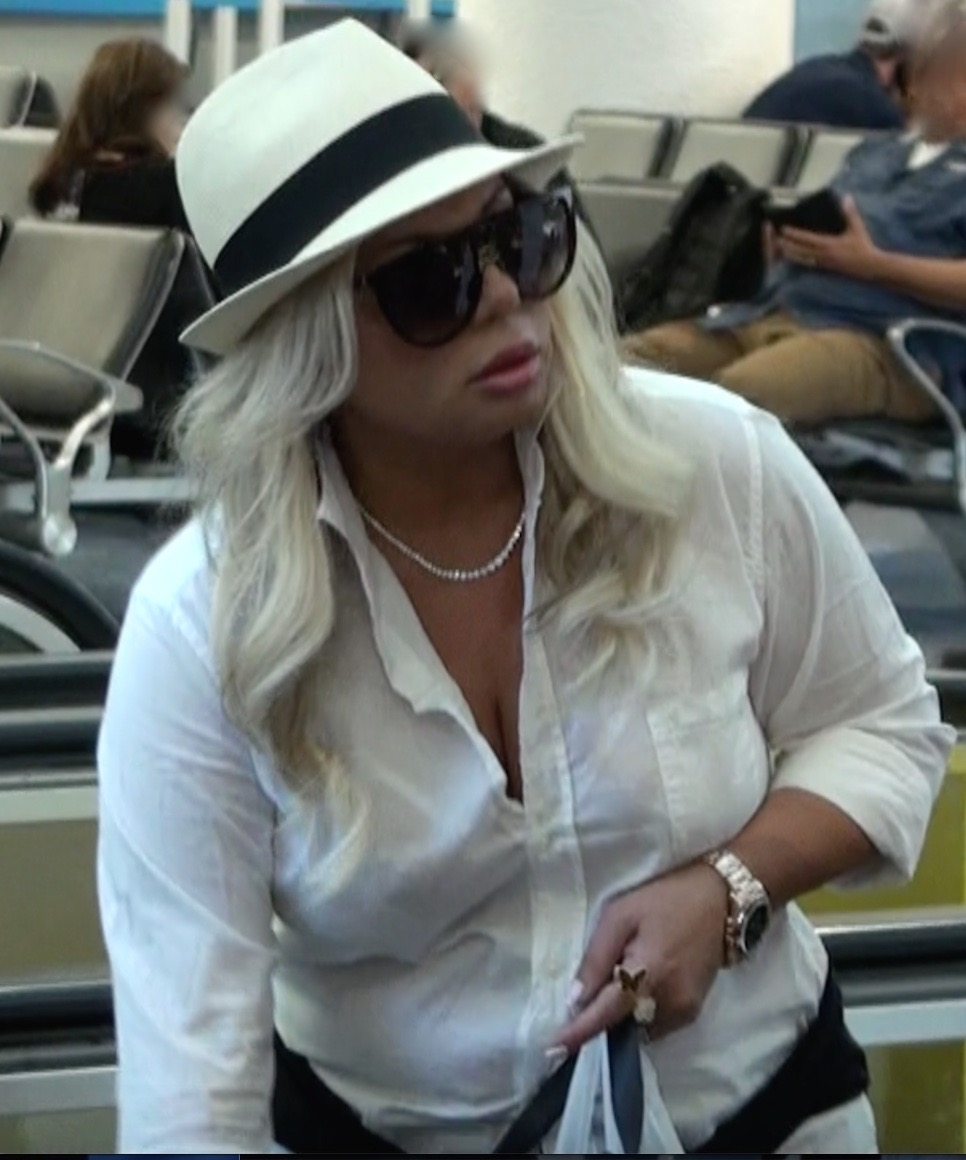
Gina Marks as photographed by Nygaard, 8/31/17

In 2016, Gina Marie Marks, using the pseudonym Natalie Miller, convinced a Maryland woman that she had bad energy around her which she could fix. When Marks stopped answering the victim's phone calls after being paid $82,000 over many months, the woman realized she was being scammed and called the police and Nygaard. An arrest warrant was issued, but Marks had fled. Nygaard tracked her to Miami International Airport, and contacted the police, who took her into custody just before she boarded a flight to Barcelona. Nygaard said, "I saw her come in with her husband and then I followed her through the TSA line, went in (and) followed them to the gate just about 15 to 20 minutes prior to her boarding the plane and heading to Europe". For Nygaard, this was a repeat run-in with Marks; he was instrumental in two previous convictions in Broward County when Marks was sentenced to 18 months in prison in 2010, and forced to repay more than half a million dollars to her victims.

In 2018, Marks was convicted of stealing more than $340,000 from five victims over three years. In September 2018, Marks was sentenced to six years in prison and ordered to pay restitution to her victims, with the judge stating that Marks' actions were premeditated and she preyed on vulnerable people.

In 2018, CBS aired an episode of its show Pink Collar Crimes documenting Marks' criminal activities and her pursuit by Nygaard.

==== Melissa Lee ====
In 2017, Melissa Lee of Woodland Hills, Los Angeles, was charged with felony grand theft for defrauding her clients of over $100,000. She was arrested after Nygaard tracked down the psychic on behalf of a young actress who alleged that the psychic had fraudulently taken $32,000.

==== Linda Marks ====
In 2017, a woman from Washington reported that she was defrauded by Linda Marks, who was operating a fortunetelling business north of Seattle, when the psychic claimed to be helping her with "spiritual cleansing and destroying evil energy". Eventually, suspecting a con, the woman enlisted the help of Nygaard, who said his client had paid Marks over $50,000 over many months. Mount Vernon police met with Nygaard and Seattle police, and started gathering details on Marks. Nygaard located Marks, leading to her arrest in Mount Vernon on charges of first-degree theft by deception; she was initially held on a $75,000 bail bond. A decade earlier, Marks had defrauded victims in South Florida of more than $2 million. In May 2006, Marks was convicted in U.S. District Court in Miami, but had been freed from Florida prison in 2008.

==== Sherry Tina Uwanawich ====
On September 6, 2019, Sherry Tina Uwanawich (aka Jacklyn Miller), a self-proclaimed "Gypsy healer", was sentenced to 40 months of incarceration by a U.S. District Judge in Florida, and ordered to pay restitution to Nygaard's client.

Uwanawich said she grew up in the "Roma culture", and the women in her family all made money in fortune-telling "at the behest of the men". She had worked at low-income locations until 17 years old, when she encountered Nygaard's client, who was then 27-year-old, at the Galleria in Houston, Texas in 2007. Uwanawich gained her trust, eventually convincing her that a witch had placed a curse on her family. Uwanawich then claimed she needed large sums of money in order to lift that curse, before harm befell her and her family. The relationship between Uwanawich and her victim continued for seven years, even after Uwanawich moved to Florida. In total, through 2014, the victim turned over approximately $1.6 million to Uwanawich.

The victim, a Brazilian medical student who was suffering from depression, turned over money to Uwanawich, which came from numerous sources, including job earnings, loan money, money borrowed from friends and family, and hundreds-of-thousands of dollars from an inheritance. The victim also paid for the psychic's services with clothing, gift cards, and a leased automobile.

Following sentencing, Nygaard said:

I'm really proud of [my client] for being brave and seeking justice instead of suffering in silence as many victims often do... If there's one thing that I've learned from years of specializing in investigating confidence crimes it's that anyone can be scammed by a professional con artist when going through a vulnerable time in his or her life.

== Concerns over inconsistent fraud prosecution ==
Nygaard says that when people report to law enforcement that they are victims of psychic fraud, they are often told that it is a civil matter, and are turned away. He says that he tries to bring the case to law enforcement "wrapped in a bow", saying, "Listen, when this person first came in, you told them it was a civil matter ... You know what? I know differently. It's a criminal matter".

But despite his success with high-profile convictions, Nygaard says he still often encounters resistance by law enforcement when he presents them with the evidence of psychic fraud. "I would like to say that things have changed, but it's like every time I walk into a new place, you're talking to a new detective or prosecutor ... Some have learned about it; a lot haven't. You still see this attitude that, 'They did it on their own free will — there's no crime here.'"

Nygaard says that while the NYPD and the Manhattan prosecutor's office are generally supportive, the situation in South and Central Florida is very different. "I've had these criminals call me up and tell me Florida is open season for them — they love it. They laugh about it because the prosecutors don't prosecute."

== Comments on psychics and victims ==
As a result of his work, Nygaard has been an outspoken critic of psychics and mediums who take advantage of desperate people. Nygaard says that these con-artists are experts at psychological manipulation and that nationwide, this fraud amounts to "billions of dollars". He says that "no other victims are more maligned than victims of psychic fraud", and that victims are often so embarrassed at being swindled that they do not report the crime, despite being broken emotionally and facing financial disaster. "They don't want to see their name in the papers". Nygaard says that psychics anticipate and use this. He says it doesn't matter if the victim is a college professor, a lawyer or a doctor. "You're on their territory. And [the psychics] know how to take advantage of that."

Nygaard categorizes much of this type of fraud as organized crime, and says "It's been going on for centuries and is passed down from generation to generation. The mothers teach their daughters." He says that storefront psychics appear to be financially struggling, but actually live in upscale houses and may "drive a Maserati".

== Support of organized skepticism ==
Beginning in 2018, Nygaard began interacting with the skeptical movement. His first interaction was as the featured guest on the Skepticality podcast where he was interviewed by Derek Colanduno. Regarding this Nygaard said, "I'm so happy that Derek contacted me because he opened the door, so to speak, to a whole new group of like-minded people..." This led to Nygaard's invitation to speak at DragonCon as part of the convention's Skeptic Track, of which he said "Realizing what a great opportunity it would be to help spread the word about psychic fraud, I immediately jumped at the chance to participate." Besides participating in the Skeptic Track, Nygaard participated in several panels on the main conference agenda including "The Science of Sherlock Holmes" and "James Bond Spy Class". Nygaard also spoke at the same convention in 2019, doing a one-hour solo presentation titled "Combating Psychic Fraud".

== Beliefs ==
When asked his opinion on anyone actually having psychic powers, Nygaard said, "Listen, no one has ever proved that they have psychic abilities since the beginning of time. And James Randi, from the James Randi Foundation, he put up a $1 million challenge to any psychic who could prove their abilities. No one has ever collected."

== See also ==
- Ann O'Delia Diss Debar
- Charlatan
- Flim-Flam!
- Houdini's debunking of psychics and mediums
- List of con artists
- List of confidence tricks
- Maria Duval scam
- Televangelist Peter Popoff exposed by James Randi
- Psychic Blues: Confessions of a Conflicted Medium
- Rose Mackenberg (Historic investigator of psychic mediums)
