= Blessing scam =

Confidence scam against elderly people

A New Zealand Police poster warning the public about blessing scams.

The blessing scam, also called the ghost scam or jewelry scam, is a confidence trick typically perpetrated against elderly women of Chinese origin. The scam originated in China and Hong Kong and victims have fallen to it worldwide including in Chinatowns and overseas Chinese communities. The object of the scam is to persuade the victim to put valuables into a bag, which the perpetrator then secretly swaps for a different bag, enabling them to take the valuables.

== Operation of the scam ==
The scam typically requires three people. One approaches the victim and casually begins a conversation, introducing the topic of a certain healer, herbalist, traditional doctor or psychic. The second con artist, a shill, appears to coincidentally overhear the conversation, and states that they know of and have been helped by the healer in question — for example, that the healer cured their broken hand or healed their mother after a stroke. This provides social proof, lending credibility to the first con artist's depiction of the healer's powers.

The two then persuade the mark to visit the healer. In some variants, they happen upon a relative of the healer who also is purported to have special powers; in others, they meet the healer himself. The healer then states that a ghost or spirit is following the mark, and that a family member is in danger or some other ill is about to befall them. The healer offers to perform a blessing ritual to get rid of the evil spirits or ghost.

The purported blessing ceremony requires the mark to put valuables in the bag, reflecting the common religious theme of needing to provide something of value in order to gain blessings. The mark is encouraged to put as much valuable content in the bag as possible. A prayer is then said over the bag containing the valuables, and the mark is reassured that the ghost has been banished, but that to preserve the effect they should not open the bag for some long amount of time.

Unbeknownst to the target of the scam, the bag containing the valuables was swapped during the ceremony for an identical bag containing valueless objects — newspaper instead of cash, for example. When the target opens the bag a month later, they realize that they have been scammed out of all their money.

== Communities targeted ==
Overseas Chinese elderly women are believed to be targeted for several reasons :

1. Non-reliance on banks – They are likely to have large amounts of cash in their homes rather than in savings accounts.
2. Social isolation – They often do not speak English, and so are more willing to talk to a stranger who approaches them speaking their own language.
3. Spiritual beliefs – In the religious traditions prevalent in these communities, it is believable that a healer would be able to spot bad energy and use a ceremony to remove it.
4. Shame culture – When they are scammed out of their life savings, they are less likely to go to the police or warn their communities because they are ashamed of having been fooled.
5. Filial piety – There is a strong sense of duty as a parent to protect their family from harm.

These scams have been reported in Chicago, San Francisco, New York, Los Angeles, Seattle, England, Turkey, Scotland, Australia, Canada, and New Zealand.

One source states that the suspects in one case had also traveled to Indonesia, Japan, Malaysia, Brunei and Cambodia. Over the course of a year, reported cases of the scam have cost San Franciscans alone over $1.5 million.

== Law enforcement response ==
San Francisco issued a public safety alert which, along with media publicity, led a mark to recognize the scam and go to the police. The prosecution was controversial because the scammers claimed they were being forced by organized crime bosses to operate the scam, or their relatives would be harmed.
