= Fortune telling fraud =

Claims about secret problems to be fixed for money

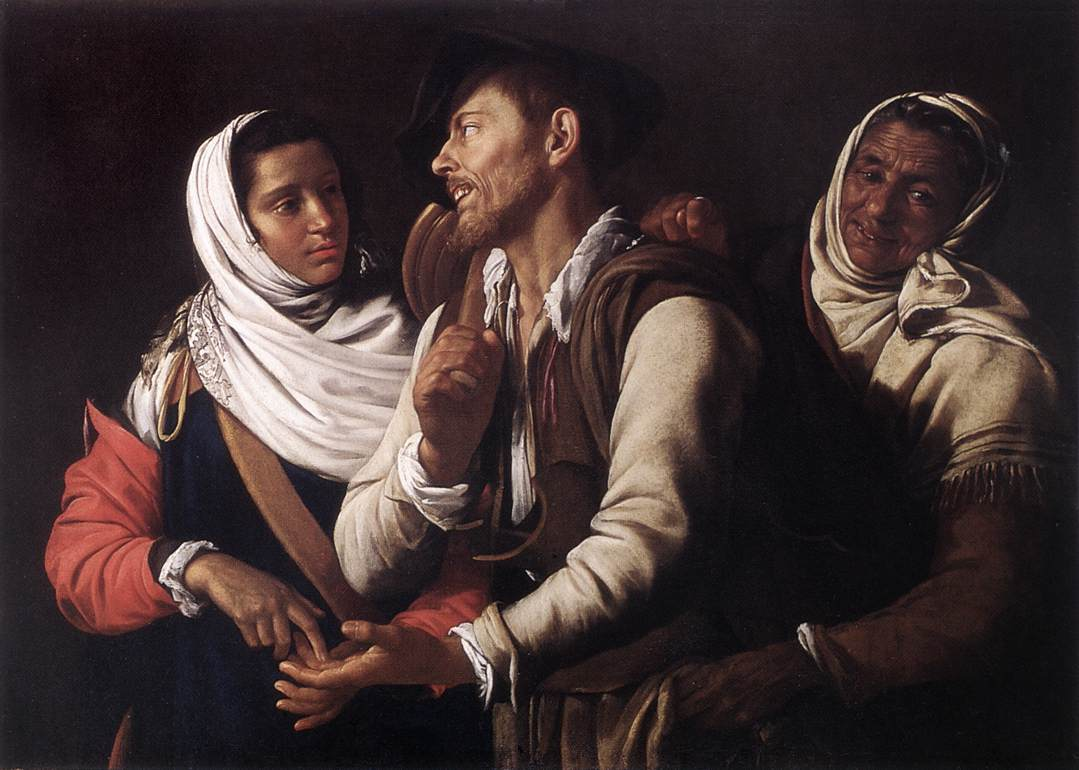
While the fortune teller entertains him, he is robbed from behind. "The Fortune Teller" by Simon Vouet.

Fortune telling fraud, also called the bujo or egg curse scam, is a type of confidence trick, based on a claim of secret or occult information. The basic feature of the scam involves diagnosing the victim (the "mark") with some sort of secret problem that only the grifter can detect or diagnose, and then charging the mark for ineffectual treatments. The archetypical grifter working the scam is a fortune teller who announces that the mark is suffering from a curse that their magic can relieve, while threatening dire consequences if the curse is not lifted.

== Method ==
In this scam, a fortune teller uses cold reading to detect that a client is genuinely troubled rather than merely seeking entertainment; or is a gambler complaining of bad luck. The fortune teller informs the mark that they are the victim of a curse, but that for a fee a spell can be cast to remove the curse. In Romani, this trick is called bujo, originally meaning simply "bag", but now meaning "a swindle involving a large amount of money from a gullible fortune-telling customer."

This name comes from a traditional form: the mark is told that the curse is in their money; they bring money in a bag to have the spell cast over it, and leave with a bag of worthless paper; or money or property are given to the fortune teller to be destroyed as bearing the curse, and an item of lesser value is swapped and conspicuously destroyed instead. In some cases the curse is "verified" by a sleight of hand trick, often involving an egg. The grifter tells the mark to bring an egg to a reading, which when cracked open reveals disgusting matter or symbols of evil. This discovery confirms the curse.

== Incidents ==
These scams continue into the present day. A 1996 reported decision out of Hawaii described the scam as "a centuries old confidence game that victimized the elderly or those with emotional problems", describing its operation in this manner:

In the Bujo, one of the female members of the Merino clan would tell the client that the future holds evil. Sleight of hand tricks, such as removing a clump of hair from a newly broken egg, were used as evidence that a client was either possessed by an evil spirit or under the influence of a curse. The female member of the Merino clan devised methods of extracting the victim's money. The victim may have been told that the money was the root of all evil, that it had to be tossed into the ocean or buried near a fresh grave in a graveyard, and credit cards were used on extravagant shopping sprees to purchase food, clothing, jewelry, and other merchandise for members of the Merino family's use and enjoyment.

A Texas woman was sentenced to 2 1/2 years on federal charges for wire fraud and money laundering after she operated a scam involving a psychic telephone line. Not only did she receive fees of several hundred dollars for her psychic counselling, but she also convinced her clients to send her money and property to be cleansed of "evil". In 2002, two self-described California based psychics were indicted on Federal mail fraud charges after persuading people to pay them to be cleared of bad karma. In 2006, two Connecticut women told another woman that God was going to kill her unless she paid them to perform various rituals, including chicken sacrifices, on her behalf. In Palmdale, California, a psychic reader was accused of inducing a 12-year-old girl to steal $10,000 worth of jewelry from her parents by threats of a curse. In 2013, con artists running a classic bujo scam were reportedly targeting Asian immigrants in New York City, tailoring their tales of curses to fit the Chinese folk religion. In Florida, a tarot card reader was found guilty for fleecing romance writer Jude Deveraux out of more than 25 million dollars.

In December 2018 Janet Lee, also known as the Greenwich psychic, was ordered by a judge in a civil lawsuit to pay one of her clients back $30,000. In 2015 Lee had convinced the client to hand over her entire life savings to Lee in cash for cleansing as there were "dark forces" surrounding the money. She told the client that she would put the money in a safety box in St. Patrick's Cathedral, Manhattan for 6 months until the money was cleansed. At the end of the 6 months, Lee refused to give the money back forcing the client to file the lawsuit.

=== Bob Nygaard ===
Beginning in 2008, Bob Nygaard, a retired New York City policeman became notable due to his work as a private detective investigating psychic fraud cases after he retired from the police force. Nygaard has claimed that the scope of this problem in the United States is very large. As an example, Nygaard discussed a case he personally worked where his client was defrauded of $900,000, and he was aware of another in which a woman was defrauded of $17 million by fortune-tellers.

In 2018, CBS aired an episode of its show Pink Collar Crimes, titled "The Psychic Didn't See Him Coming" which told the story of Nygaard's investigation of "psychic" Gina Marie Marks' crimes for 10 years. Nygaard played himself on the show.

A Skeptical Inquirer article reported that, as of February 2020, Nygaard had "helped to cause approximately forty self-proclaimed psychics to be arrested and successfully convicted" and had helped victims recover over $4 million. Regarding the recovery amount, Nygaard said that the $4 million reflects what his clients have recovered as a result of his efforts. The criminal restitution orders, he says, were for much more. However, victims are largely unable to collect on such orders given that self-proclaimed psychics rarely keep any assets in their names.

=== Unification Church ===
The Unification Church (UC) is a new religion founded by Sun Myung Moon in Seoul in 1954, with its missionaries beginning activities in Japan in 1958. The UC is accused of engaging in what is locally termed "spiritual sales" (Japanese: 霊感商法, romanized: reikan shōhō). The UC would tell their targets that they must donate to the church or they or their relatives, either living or deceased, would be damned to hell. The UC demands their targets to donate all of their savings, as well as sell their properties or apply for loans for the payments. The UC also sells religious merchandise such as inkan, pottery, art and ginseng with extremely high price tags, all claimed to be able to bring good luck to the believers. According to the National Network of Lawyers Against Spiritual Sales, an anti-cult lawyers' group, the confirmed financial damages linked to the UC during the 35 years through 2021 surpassed 123.7 billion yen (899.2 million USD).

According to the Japanese lawyer Masaki Kito, who also represents the anti-cult lawyers' group, the UC specifically targets the Japanese people because of the invasion of Korea by Japan. The UC would tell their target that "in order to atone that sin, you must make contributions to Korea".

UC's practice of spiritual sales was widely reported by Japanese media as the primary cause which drove the prime suspect Tetsuya Yamagami, whose mother went bankrupt due to her exorbitant donations to the church, to assassinate former prime minister Shinzo Abe on 8 July 2022. The event led to a significant decrease in the approval rating of the Kishida Cabinet. Just after incumbent prime minister Fumio Kishida's cabinet reshuffle, the newly appointed Minister of Digital Affairs Taro Kono announced on 12 August 2022 to quickly form a review committee in the Consumer Affairs Agency to deal with the issues of spiritual sales. Urged by organizations of anti-cultism and cult victims, on 10 December 2022, Japan's parliament passed new laws of "Prevention of Unfair Solicitation of Donations by Corporations Act" which criminalizes corporations for acquiring donations against the claimant's free will or causing the claimant to apply for loans for donation. It grants legal rights for the claimant, as well as the claimant's spouse or children, to cancel the donation or demand restitution if the donation is proven illegal.

== Legal issues ==
A desire to protect people from this scam has been one argument made to justify legislation that makes fortune telling a crime. A New York State statute condemns a person who "claims or pretends" to "influence or affect evil spirits or curses" in its prohibition of fortune telling, while letting a person "who engages in the aforedescribed conduct as part of a show or exhibition solely for the purpose of entertainment or amusement" off the hook. Most current judicial opinions have held that fortune telling in itself is protected speech under the First Amendment, though some judges have noted that "such devices are routinely, if not uniformly used to bilk or fleece gullible patrons."

== High tech variants ==
In the Datalink Computer Services incident, a mark was fleeced of several million dollars by a firm that claimed that his computer was infected with viruses, and that the infection indicated an elaborate conspiracy against him on the Internet, involving the Central Intelligence Agency and Opus Dei. The victim was charged for elaborate and unnecessary computer security services, including the claim that a member of the Indian military had been sent to Honduras to investigate the source of the virus. The alleged scam lasted from August 2004 through October 2010 and is estimated to have cost the victim between 6 and US$20 million. The victim later stated that he had been defrauded by "grifters of the highest order".

See Telemarketing fraud for information about a common scam in which fraud artists install malware on victims' computers.

== In popular culture ==
The US television series Shut Eye features a number of fictional examples of fortune telling fraud in the first six minutes of the first episode (S01E01, Death). The egg curse scam is shown being perpetrated by a fraudulent fortune teller. At the end of the ritual, as the client's money is supposedly being burned, the client strikes the fortune teller from her chair. The client searches the fortune teller's garments and finds the client's original egg and money. He then warns the fortune teller: “You don’t work bujo. Ever. Bujo is ours.” Later in the episode, it is revealed that the client represents Romani fortune tellers.

== See also ==
- Advance fee fraud
- Ann O'Delia Diss Debar
- Blessing scam
- Bob Nygaard (psychic fraud investigator)
- Chain letter
- Charlatan
- Confidence trick
- Con artist
- Curse
- Flim-Flam!
- Houdini's debunking of psychics
- List of con artists
- List of confidence tricks
- Oxford Capacity Analysis
- Televangelist Peter Popoff
- Psychic Blues: Confessions of a Conflicted Medium
- Quackery
- Rogue security software
- Romance scam
- Rose Mackenberg (historic psychic medium investigator)
- Virus hoax
