= Psychic Blues =

2012 memoir by Mark Edward

Psychic Blues: Confessions of a Conflicted Medium
- Psychic Blues cover
- Author: Mark Edward
- Cover artist: Sean Tejaratchi
- Language: English
- Subjects: Psychic Reading
- Publisher: Feral House
- Publication date: August 7, 2012
- Media type: Print (Paperback)
- Pages: 340
- ISBN: 978-1-936239-27-6

Psychic Blues: Confessions of a Conflicted Medium is a memoir by Mark Edward about his time working as a psychic entertainer. Published in 2012, the book covers Edward's controversial career as both a performer and a skeptical activist.

== Overview ==
Mark Edward gives the reader a look into the world of the psychic entertainer. From working the overnight shift answering the telephone for the Psychic Friends Network to counseling the rich and famous at celebrity galas, the author paints a picture of what it is really like to work in this profession. The book was published in paperback format in 2012 by Feral House. In 2015, Edward announced plans for the production of an audiobook version containing a substantial amount of additional material about his influences, personal life, and motivations.

This book contains only my observations of the psychic world in its most likely paradigm: a terribly disappointing con.

— Mark Edward, page xiii

In 2019, the audiobook "Psychic Blues: New Expanded Edition" was released. Read by the author himself, Edward states he reverted to the original manuscript submitted to the publisher for his reading of the audiobook, as the paperback was substantially edited by the book's publisher to reflect the darker side of the psychic image.

== About the author ==
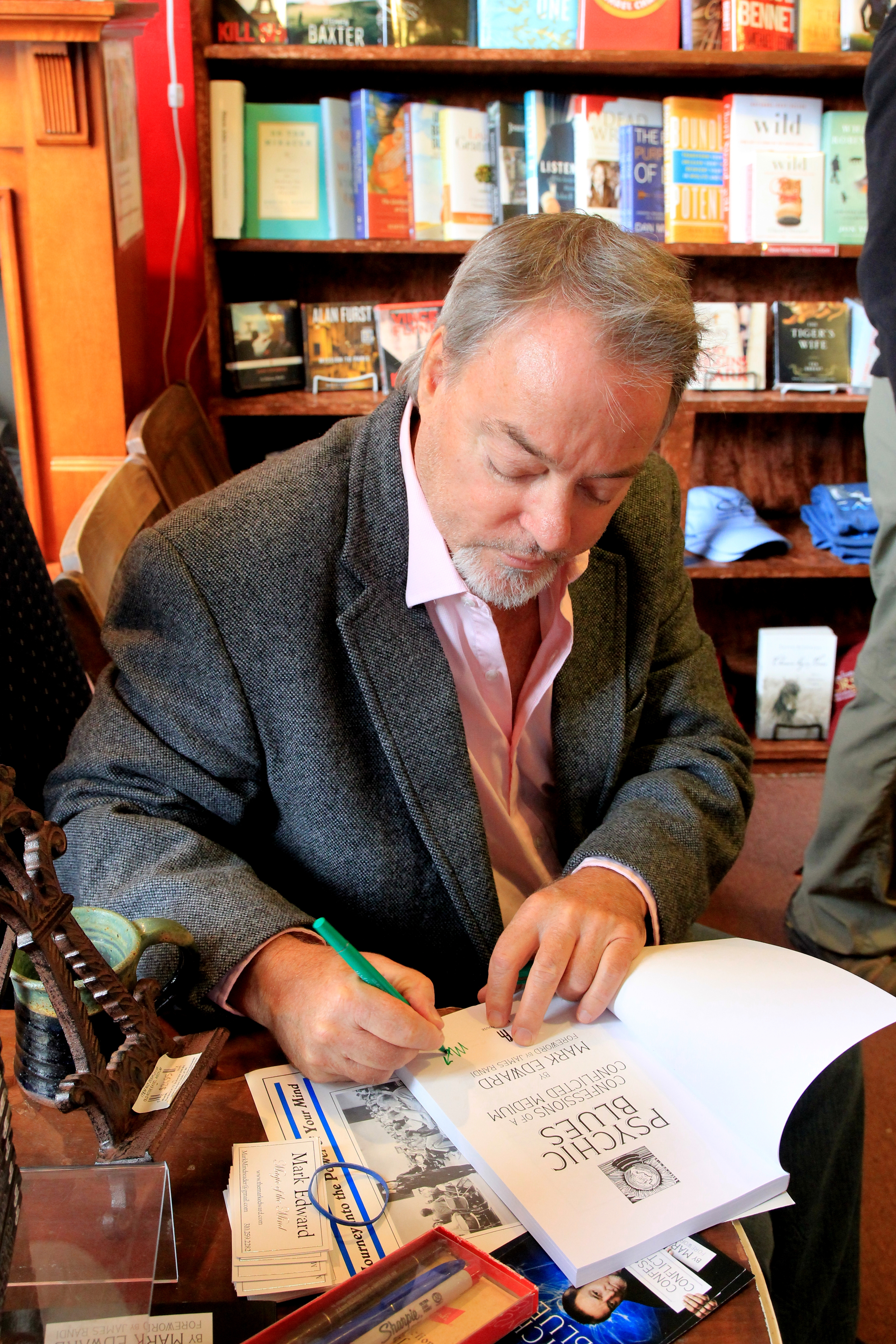
Mark Edward at a book signing

Mark Edward (born Mark Edward Wilson) first acquired an interest in performing and magic from his grandfather, who was a magician himself. His career as a performer began in the 1970s, and has included 14 years at The Magic Castle, where he gave palmistry and tarot readings and conducted séances. He has also performed at a wide variety of venues, including private homes, a spiritualist church, corporate events, celebrity parties (including a baby shower at Eddie Murphy's house and Buddy Hackett's 70th birthday party), and large public gatherings such as Dragon Con. His work with the Psychic Friends Network led him to the conclusion that all psychic entertainers were using only natural techniques, and that the public would be better served by his revealing these techniques.

== Reception ==
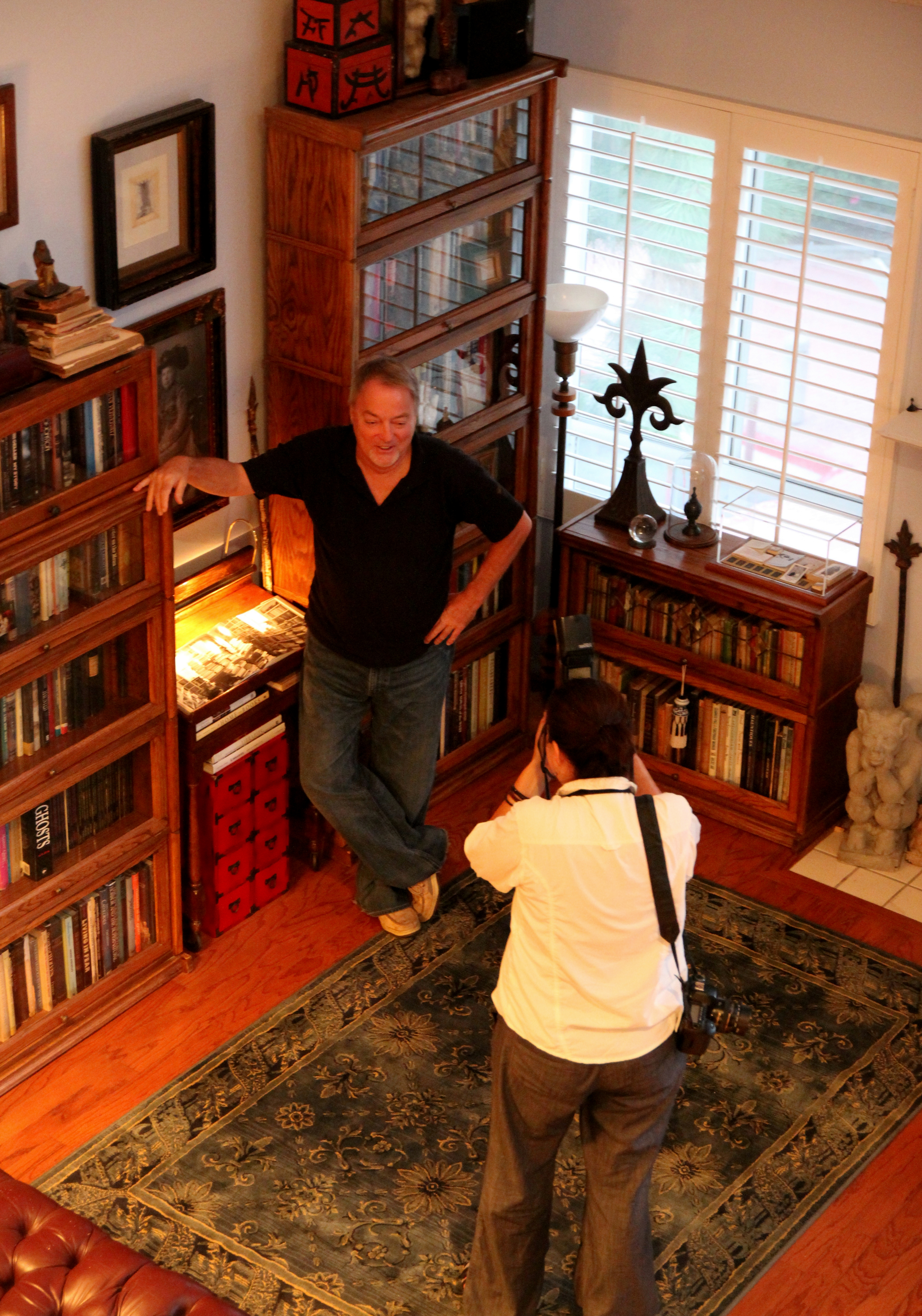
Photo Shoot for The New York Times

Mark Oppenheimer of The New York Times placed Edward's book in the tradition of other performers—such as James Randi, Harry Houdini, and Penn & Teller—who simultaneously "perform their crafts and debunk them". Oppenheimer also commented on the "conflicted" nature of the book, saying, "there is something tragic about his own ambivalence. From page to page, he cannot decide which side he is on. Sometimes he is crusading against the mountebanks and charlatans. Other times he defends his work as pure entertainment." He called the book, "A strange mishmash of self-pity, self-justification, and genuine repentance—and a compelling look at the disputed territory where entertainment meets religion, where some practitioners actually think they can practice both at the same time."

The subject matter of this book caused ITV's program This Morning to invite Edward to speak about "supernatural swindlers" on May 1, 2014.

A Carmel Pine Cone newspaper article noted, "The book has stirred up attention both in the United States and abroad", and, "His message is that so-called psychics don’t have supernatural powers—they're just master manipulators and are well versed in saying what people want to hear—and that most of them are simply frauds."

Skeptical activist and podcaster John Rael also recognized the dual nature of the book. Writing in a Skeptic.com book review, Rael chided Edward for continuing to perform as a psychic entertainer while still recognizing the value of the book itself. “The greatest tragedy of this book is that Edward seems to miss out on his own lesson, and it’s a really good one: . . . that we should listen to each other and talk to each other much more than we do." Of the book, Rael said: "[D]o you want to learn about psychics? The people, not the tricks? Do you want to understand who psychics are and not just how they operate? Here is your book."

Writing for Skeptical Inquirer, Ray Hyman acknowledged Edward's "ambiguous role in the skeptical community," stating that, "He is quite active in helping skeptical groups test psychic claims and debunk obviously phony psychics who exploit their clients. At the same time, Edward still performs as a 'psychic.' He does not claim to have psychic powers. On the other hand, he does not openly disclaim such powers." Of the book itself, Hyman said, "Because it provides us a rare insight into a psychic's world, as well as raising some important ethical issues for skeptics to ponder, I highly recommend every skeptic carefully read and ponder this book's contents."

== See also ==
- Ann O'Delia Diss Debar ("One of the most extraordinary fake mediums... the world has ever known" -Houdini)
- Flim-Flam! (Psychics, ESP, Unicorns and other Delusions)
- Fortune telling fraud
- Houdini's debunking of psychics and mediums
- John Edward
- Long Island Medium
- Monica the Medium
- Televangelist Peter Popoff exposed by James Randi
- Psychic Friends Network, telephone psychic service
- Rose Mackenberg (Historic investigator of psychic mediums)
