= Rose Mackenberg =

American investigator

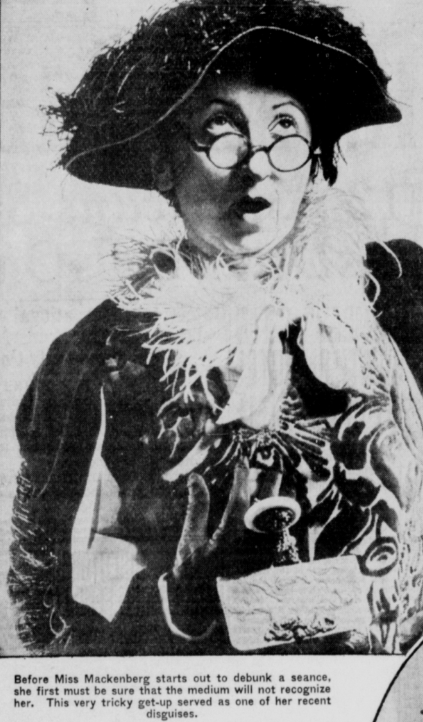
- Born: July 10, 1892; Brooklyn, New York
- Died: April 10, 1968 (aged 75); Suffolk, New York
- Occupations: Investigator, writer
- Years active: 1925–1955
- Known for: Debunking psychic fraud for Harry Houdini

Rose Mackenberg (July 10, 1892 – April 10, 1968) was an American investigator specializing in fraudulent psychic mediums, known for her association with Harry Houdini. She was chief of a team of undercover investigators who investigated mediums for Houdini in the 1920s. After Houdini's death, she continued to investigate spiritualist fraud for over 20 years and was known as an expert on the subject. She testified in court cases and before Congress and was interviewed in national magazines and on television.

== Early life ==
Mackenberg was born July 10, 1892, and lived in Brooklyn, New York City. In her early years she worked as a stenographer in a law office and as an investigator in New York City. She reportedly believed that psychics and fortunetellers were able to communicate with spirits and foretell the future.

== Houdini's investigator ==
In the early 1920s, Mackenberg was working on a case for a banker who had suffered losses after making investments on the advice of a psychic medium. She sought Houdini's help in the case, as he was very publicly engaged in a campaign against false mediums.

Impressed with Mackenberg, Houdini educated her on the tricks that mediums use to manipulate their victims. In 1925, Houdini hired her as part of his undercover investigator team. The team included several other women such as Houdini's niece Julia Sawyer and a showgirl named Alberta Chapman. Men on the team included Clifford M. Eddy, Jr., Robert H. Gysel, and Amadeo Vacca.

While Houdini was on tour in 1925 and 1926, Mackenberg and the other investigators would precede him by up to 10 days into each city to perform undercover investigations of the local spiritualists or psychic mediums. To remain undercover, they used various disguises and false names, some of them containing puns like "Frances Raud" (for FRAUD) and "Alicia Bunck" (for All Is A Bunk). Mackenberg sometimes wore a hearing aid she didn't need. Her very detailed written reports for Houdini have been studied and exhibited in museums.

Mackenberg appeared on stage with Houdini in many tour stops, including Indianapolis, Worcester, Mass. Washington, D.C. Chicago, New York and Montreal. When Houdini performed in each city, he would debunk local mediums from the stage, presenting the gathered evidence. Houdini and his investigators became the target of great anger from the spiritualists. It was said he carried a Derringer and he advised Mackenberg to carry a gun as well, but she refused.

Mackenberg earned the respect of Houdini and his team and was considered his chief investigator. The other investigators sometimes called her "The Rev" because of the multiple bogus spiritualist diplomas and titles she had acquired during her investigations. Prior to his death, Houdini set up secret codes with more than twenty friends to attempt to communicate with them from beyond the grave. Mackenberg was among those chosen, and in 1945 she reported "the message has not come through."

Mackenberg decided, after Houdini's unexpected death, to carry on the investigations alone.

== Expert on psychic fraud ==
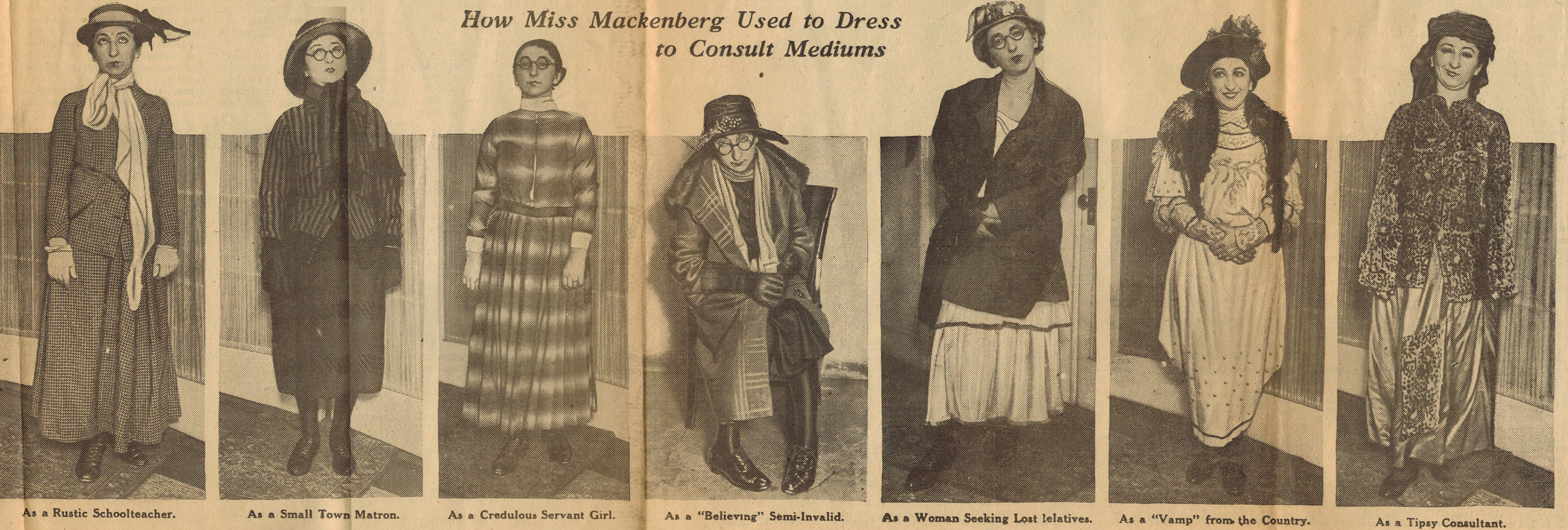
Mackenberg in séance disguises

Because of her investigative work, Mackenberg was considered an expert on the practices of fraudulent psychics. Mackenberg worked with police, insurance, and trust companies and testified in countless civil and criminal lawsuits involving spiritualism. She claimed to have investigated over 1,000 mediums and never found one who was not a fraud. For example, the various mediums had claimed to communicate with over three dozen non-existent deceased husbands, despite Mackenberg being single. According to William Lindsay Gresham, Julien Proskauer credited Mackenberg for "much of his material" in his book The Dead Do Not Talk.

=== Congressional testimony ===
In the first session of the 69th Congress, an anti-fortunetelling law for Washington, D.C., was put forward on the urging of Houdini. The Copeland-Bloom bill (H.R. 8989) came before a House committee beginning February 26, 1926. Houdini was to testify in its favor.

Following the same pattern as during the tour, Mackenberg visited local Washington mediums in the days prior to the hearings. She targeted local mediums, including Jane B. Coates and Madam Grace Marcia, who were scheduled to testify against the bill. Her testimony on May 18, 1926, included the revelation that Coates had told her that Senators Capper, Watson, Dill, and Fletcher "had come to her for readings" and that "table tipping seances are held at the White House" with President Coolidge and his family. This was met with raucous denials in the committee room, and a "fracas" ensued. The meeting was adjourned. President Coolidge did not officially respond to the accusation but unofficial denials were made known in the press. Ultimately H.R. 8989 did not pass, but the hearings received wide press coverage.

=== Lockwood's estate ===
After Houdini's death in October 1926, Mackenberg continued to investigate fraudulent psychics for over 20 years and served as an expert on them in various venues. One court case in Pennsylvania involved the 1939 will of Augustus T. Lockwood. He had bequeathed a large sum of money to a "Spiritualistic College to Educate Mediums" at Lily Dale, New York, a famous camp and meeting place for spiritualists. The state of Pennsylvania sought to invalidate the will, in part on the argument that the bequest would benefit criminal behavior and thus would be "against public policy". Mackenberg was called as the "star witness" and the state was successful at trial. The case was appealed, however, and overturned by higher courts.

== Public outreach ==
In addition to her investigations, Mackenberg attempted to educate the public on psychic fraud. She toured the country giving lectures on psychic fraud to various groups. A typical talk title was “Debunking the Ghost Racket”. These talks would include demonstrations of techniques used by psychics including spirit trumpets, table tipping, billet reading and so on.

She wrote a series of articles on the "ghost racket," which were serialized in newspapers in 1929 and posthumously anthologized and re-published in 2016. A manuscript titled So You Want to Attend a Seance? gathered these reports, but the manuscript itself has never been published. She also assisted with investigations which were published in major media outlets such as Popular Science, The Chicago Tribune and The Saturday Evening Post. She appeared on television talk shows including Mike and Buff and Tonight Starring Steve Allen.

== Personal life ==
She remained single and continued to live in the New York City area in a "well lighted" apartment "because I get tired of dark rooms". Her friends called her "Mac". She died in April 1968.

== Representations in popular culture ==
In 2017, Mackenberg was featured alongside Houdini in re-enactment sequences during season 14, episode 13 of the Travel Channel's documentary series Mysteries at the Museum. The re-enactments included Mackenberg's investigations of spiritualist seances and her 1926 congressional testimony.

In 2023, The Museum of Revelatory Fakes podcast produced an episode about Rose Mackenberg and Harry Houdini that features commentary by scholars Efram Sera-Shriar, Matt Tompkins, and Christine Ferguson.

== See also ==
- Ann O'Delia Diss Debar ("One of the most extraordinary fake mediums... the world has ever known" -Houdini)
- Bob Nygaard (Psychic fraud investigator)
- Charlatan
- Con artist
- Confidence trick
- Fortune telling fraud
- List of con artists
- List of confidence tricks
- Televangelist Peter Popoff exposed by James Randi

== Bibliography and further reading ==
- United States Congress House Committee on the District of Columbia (1926). Fortune Telling: Hearings Before the Subcommittee on Judiciary...on H.R. 8989. Washington, DC: U.S. Government Printing Office. pp. 30–36, 62–63, 94–95, 132–140. OCLC 82094540.
- Mackenberg, Rose; Harry Price (1939). When Crime Poses As Spiritualism. New York: American Weekly. OCLC 940082483.
- Mackenberg, Rose (February 1941). "They Gave Me 1,500 Husbands". The American Magazine. Vol. 131. ISSN 2155-7225.
- Mackenberg, Rose; Fishman, Joseph Fulling (March 3, 1951). "I've Unmasked a Thousand Frauds". The Saturday Evening Post. Vol. 223, no. 36. pp. 26–27, 103–105. ISSN 0048-9239.
- Pankratz, Loren (July–August 1995). "Rose Mackenberg: Crusader Against Spiritualist Fraud". Skeptical Inquirer. Vol. 19, no. 4. Committee for Skeptical Inquiry. pp. 28–29. ISSN 0194-6730.
- Polidoro, Massimo (2001). Final Séance: The Strange Friendship Between Houdini and Conan Doyle. Prometheus Books. pp. 180–181, 189. ISBN 978-1-61592-424-0.
- Kalush, William; Sloman, Larry (2006). The Secret Life of Houdini: The Making of America's First Superhero. New York: Simon and Schuster. pp. 455–457, 460–461, 466, 478–479, 482–484, 487–488, 505–506. ISBN 978-0-74327-207-0. OCLC 74332162.
- Samuel, Lawrence R. (2011). Supernatural America: A Cultural History. Santa Barbara, Calif.: Praeger. pp. 68–73. ISBN 978-0-313-39899-5. OCLC 707211515.
- Sandford, Christopher (2011). Masters of Mystery the Strange Friendship of Arthur Conan Doyle and Harry Houdini. New York: Palgrave Macmillan. pp. 193, 197, 202, 206. ISBN 978-0230619500. OCLC 706021015.
- Loxton, Daniel (Winter 2013). "Ghostbuster Girls!". Junior Skeptic. Vol. 18, no. 1. pp. 74–75. ISSN 1063-9330. Archived from the original on September 11, 2016 – via HighBeam Research.
- Wolf, Tony (May 5, 2016). "The Female Ghost Buster Who Rooted Out Spiritual Fraud for Houdini". Atlas Obscura.
- Mackenberg, Rose; Wolf, Tony (2016). Houdini's "Girl Detective": The Real-Life Ghost-Busting Adventures of Rose Mackenberg. Chicago. ASIN B01LFX8MXW.
- Edwards, Gavin (December 6, 2019). "Overlooked No More: Rose Mackenberg, Houdini's Secret 'Ghost-Buster'". The New York Times.
