= Ann O'Delia Diss Debar =

Medium and fraudster

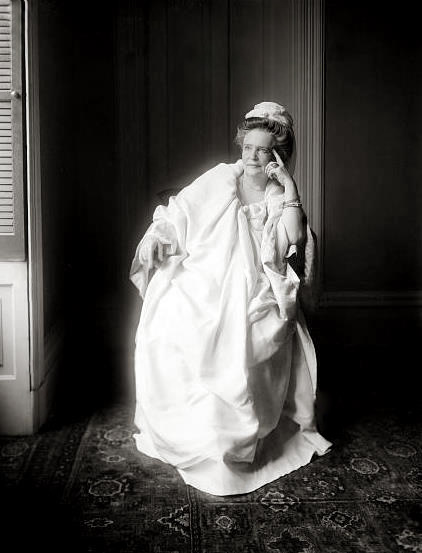
- A portrait of Ann O'Delia Diss Debar
- Born: Editha Salomen (probable); 1849
- Other names: Ann O'Delia Salomon; Della Ann O'Sullivan; Vera Ava; Editha Lola Montez; Madame Messant (or McGonn); Swami Viva Ananda; Laura Horos; Laura Jackson
- Citizenship: United States
- Occupation: Medium

Ann O'Delia Diss Debar (probably born Ann O'Delia Salomon, c. 1849 – 1909 or later) was a notorious criminal and supposed medium. She was convicted of fraud several times in the US, and was tried for rape and fraud in London in 1901. She was described by Harry Houdini as "one of the most extraordinary fake mediums and mystery swindlers the world has ever known".

== Biography ==
Although many sources claim that Ann O'Delia Diss Debar was born as Editha Salomen in Kentucky in 1849, no documentary proof exists. Another commonly reported birth name is Ann O'Delia Salomon which is corroborated by census data and a family bible given as evidence in an 1888 court case. Her alleged father, Prof. John C. F. Salomon, was a Professor of Music at Greenville Female Institute, also known as Daughters' College which now exists as the Beaumont Inn in Harrodsburg, Kentucky. When George C.T. Salomon came forward as her brother, Diss Debar denied any relationship. He said of Diss Debar, "Whenever she enters a house peace departs and with it everything portable. Nothing is safe in her hands. I would not believe her under oath in any circumstances." The Salomon family claimed that after age 2, she conducted herself as a "child of Lucifer" with uncontrollable rages, and she ran away to France at a young age.

She herself claimed to have been born in Italy in 1854, the daughter of King Ludwig I of Bavaria and his notorious mistress, the dancer Lola Montez, and that she was raised by foster parents from a young age. She reportedly badgered the Montez estate into paying her a $300 settlement, though the lawyer thought her claims unfounded.

Ann O'Delia Diss Debar (also spelled Ann O'Delia Dis Debar) is the most frequently referenced of the many names used by her in her lifetime, including Editha Lola Montez, Della Ann O'Sullivan, Vera Ava, Madame Messant (or McGoon), Swami Viva Ananda, Laura Horos (or Swami Laura Horos) and Laura Jackson. British occultist Samuel Liddell MacGregor Mathers (1854–1918) briefly believed that she was Anna Sprengel.

She apparently became involved with Victoria Claflin and Tennessee Claflin, popular exponents of spiritualism, in the 1860s and 70s, and was a disciple of Madame Blavatsky. She claimed to be the wife of West Virginia statesman Joseph H. Diss Debar, and produced "spirit paintings" by Old Masters. She was prosecuted several times for fraud. One example was the case of Luther R. Marsh, a wealthy and distinguished lawyer who had studied in the law office of Daniel Webster. Diss Debar persuaded the elderly Marsh to give her his townhouse on New York City's Madison Avenue, for which she was imprisoned on Blackwell's Island for 6 months in 1888. The magician Carl Hertz appeared for the prosecution at the New York trial, helping to send Horos to jail by duplicating in court the tricks she had used in her séances.

Under the name Vera P. Ava, she was convicted of larceny in Illinois and sentenced on March 24, 1893, to the Joliet Correctional Center (then Joliet Penitentiary) for two years. According to The New York Times, during the trial she claimed not to be the "famous spook priestess" though the article continues to say, "that she is Dis Debar (sic) no one doubts." Soon after she emerged from prison, she married William J. McGowan, who "had considerable money. He died soon afterward."

She married Frank Dutton Jackson in Louisiana in 1899, calling herself Princess Editha Lolita. As Editha Loleta Jackson, she was expelled from New Orleans in May 1899 as a swindler. She was imprisoned for 30 days later that month. After 1899, she spent some time in South Africa, calling herself Helena Horos of the College of Occult Sciences.

Diss Debar and Jackson went to England, calling themselves "Swami Laura Horos" and "Theodore Horos". They set up a "Purity League" at the Theocratic Unity Temple, near Regent's Park in London, and worked as fortune tellers and diviners, advertising their services in newspapers, such as The People and the now defunct Western Morning Advertiser. They were arrested in Birkenhead in September 1901, and charged with obtaining property by false pretenses, rape and buggery. The charges seem to have arisen from decadent sexual practices at their temple in London. The couple defended themselves, but Diss Debar was sentenced to 7-years imprisonment, and her husband to 15 years. She was held in the prison in Aylesbury, released on parole in July 1906 and immediately went missing, apparently leaving England for the United States. Thereafter, she was wanted by Scotland Yard.

She was interviewed in January 1907 by the Detroit Free Press, this time as Mother Elinor, High Priestess of the Flying Rollers of the New Eve—a religious cult. She swindled members out of expensive jewels and promised deeds to land that did not exist. When the article was published and her identity was under threat, she escaped.

She was next found in Cincinnati in 1909, under the name Vera Ava.

In August 1909, Diss Debar attempted to start a new religious cult called the New Revelation in New York City, but abandoned the plan at the School of Mahatmas on 32nd Street one week before it was to open after journalists revealed her true identity.

She is reported to have had children with some of her husbands, including Diss Debar.

A biography is included in the 1938 book Beware Familiar Spirits by the American magician John Mulholland (reprinted in 1979).

== See also ==
- Fortune telling fraud

== Sources ==
- Harry Price. (1939). Rape and Rhabdomancy, The Law and the Medium. In Fifty Years of Psychical Research. Longmans, Green and Company.
