= GMD Studios =

- Industry: Media; Advertising
- Founded: 1995; 30 years ago
- Headquarters: Winter Park, Florida, United States
- Website: gmdstudios.com

GMD Studios is a former experimental media lab and venture development firm. Their work focused on a number of areas including experience design, custom publishing, entertainment, transmedia storytelling, community building, and digital integration. Additionally, the firm providedadvertising services to agencies and brands like Sega, Scholastic, and Audi. The company was founded in 1995. Founder Brian Clark died after a cancer diagnosis in 2015 and the agency ceased.

== Selected notable work ==
Brian Clark and Tammy Kearns founded GMD studios in 1995. Brian served variously as CEO and President.

In 1997, GMD Studios formed ReveNews, an online publication that covers a wide variety Internet-focused studies, ranging from the analytics of online marketing, to online security and legal issues.

In 2000, GMD Studios teamed up with Haxan Films to create the FOX TV show FreakyLinks, largely inspired by the Haxan-directed indie film The Blair Witch Project.

In 2002, Brian Clark and Tammy Kearns of GMD Studios produced the mockumentary Nothing So Strange directed by Brian Flemming, which imagined the assassination of Microsoft founder Bill Gates on December 2, 1999.

In 2004, the firm helped Sega create the Beta 7 hoax to promote its new football video game. The campaign was later listed as one of ten “Best Non-TV Campaigns of the Decade” by Advertising Age.

In 2005 and 2006, GMD Studios collaborated with game designer Dave Szulborski to create alternative reality campaigns for Audi and General Motors.
