= George S. McMullen =

George B. McMullen was an intuitive archaeologist and forensic remote viewer who claimed that he had the ability to use paranormal psychic abilities to use objects to tune into scenes from the past. He claimed that he had strong extrasensory perception to locate ancient sites for archaeological digs, or describe context of artifacts. McMullen and another remote viewer, Hella Hammid, worked with Dr. Stephan A. Schwartz undertaking psychic archeology in the Alexandria Project.

McMullen is the author of One White Crow which was published in 1995 and describes his long life experience as intuitive archaeologist. McMullen is also the author of Running Bear published in 1996, Two Faces published in 1997, and Born Many Times published in 1999. He died on June 4, 2008.

== See also ==
- New Age
- Psychic archaeology
- Psychic detective
