= Jeffrey Goodman =

American archaeologist

Jeffrey Goodman is an independent American archaeologist with training in geology and archaeology. His early career was in oil exploration.

Goodman is most notable for his controversial ideas about modern humans originating in California 500,000 years ago, which are widely dismissed as unsupported by evidence.

== Biography ==
Goodman holds a geological engineering degree from the Colorado School of Mines, a M.A. in anthropology from the University of Arizona, and a Ph.D. in anthropology from California Coast University. He also earned a M.B.A. from Columbia University Graduate School of Business. He was accredited by the former Society of Professional Archeologists from 1978 to 1987.

He used to be known as a proponent of psychic archaeology. Goodman is most well known for his idea that modern man was found in California 500,000 years ago. In his book American Genesis Goodman maintains that the conventional scenario is backwards, and that modern human beings originated not in Africa, but in California, where he cites the proverbial Garden of Eden, half a million years ago. He also attributes to these early humans many discoveries considered to be much later, from pottery to insulin to "the applied understanding of the physics behind Einstein's gravity waves".

Later Goodman called for a Multiregional origin of modern humans. Goodman’s next book was The Genesis Mystery: the Sudden Appearance of Man and according to Paul Dean of the Los Angeles Times it is “something of an academic brush with scientific creationism, the belief that a divine surge, without explicit adherence to the Bible, created modern man… 250,000 years ago.”. His more recent work has been in biblical archaeology.

== Flagstaff excavation ==
Goodman began excavation at Flagstaff, Arizona in the 1970s while still a student in the archaeological graduate program at the University of Arizona. Through the help of the psychic Aron Abrahamsen, he predicted that the excavation of a 10 foot wide test pit there would find stone tools from 4 to 20 feet, a minimum date of 20,000 years at the 15 foot level, a geological disconformity at the 15 foot level, a date of 100,000 years at 20 feet, and some human and animal skeletal material at the 20 foot plus level. As predicted, except for the human skeletal material, all of these things were found.

In the 1979 dig season Dr. Alan Bryan of the University of Alberta and his team excavated at the site, and they found an engraved stone at 23 feet that is called the “Flagstaff Stone.” The “Flagstaff Stone” is thought by Goodman to be approximately one hundred thousand years old and according to Goodman, possibly “one of the most important artifacts ever found in the whole world”, citing in the last instance Alexander Marshack of Harvard’s Peabody Museum. 3 [Goodman 1981:214.] The archaeologist Stephen Williams wrote that "Marshack has said that he was badly misquoted by Goodman, and the date is arrived at by extreme extrapolation." In a review of American Genesis by Dennis Stanford, Stanford quotes Marshack as having said that although he saw the grooves as intentional, “Every groove without exception had been deepened and straightened, reworked after it was dug out of the ground . . . thus the stone cannot be used as evidence that early man engraved it.”

Some have claimed the stone is a piece of tuff about two and a half inches long which according to Goodman, is 100,000 years old and is Paleo-Indian art.

== Human origins ==
Goodman is the author of American Genesis: The American Indian and the origins of modern man (1981) in which he claims that homo sapiens originated in North America in California 500,000 years ago and then spread to the rest of the world. His views have been compared to the paleontologist Florentino Ameghino who believed that humanity had originated on the banks of Río de la Plata.

Goodman claims that the fossils in North America are "twice as old as the oldest fully modern skull from europe". In his work he attempted to show that the American Indians were not only the first Americans but were the first humans on earth. Goodman allows that hominids did appear in Asia and Africa, though homo sapiens are completely American in origin according to his theory. Goodman's theory has been criticised as his explanation of the relationship between hominids and humans was vaguely discussed. However Goodman in a later book addressed the issue in The Genesis Mystery: the Sudden Appearance of Man (1983) in which he criticised natural selection and advocated a type of spiritual evolution by claiming that archaeological findings verify an unbridgeable gap between modern man and the last "pre-man" creature and advocates spiritual intervention as the explanation for the "sudden appearance" of modern man. According to Michael Anthony Corey: Goodman "appeals to an intervening supernatural force, which would have manifested itself entirely through a "natural" series of evolutionary processes".

Goodman's theories are popular amongst American Indian creationists who believe that the American Indians originated in America and had not migrated there from Asia. Few scientists today give Goodman's ideas and his use of evidence much credence.

== Comets ==
Goodman has his own publishing company which in 2010 published the book The Comets of God-New Scientific Evidence for God which suggests that the Bible tells how God used comets to create disasters such as Noah's Flood. Julia Ann Charpentier of ForeWord Reviews writes: “Past events in the bible often have a verifiable historical or archeological basis. Though Christian fundamentalists may recoil from scientific exploration of what they believe to be unfathomable, sacred words, some experts have presented convincing theories for reinterpretation of biblical occurrences and predictions. Jeffrey Goodman, along with other scientists who preceded him, proposes that comets made an appearance in the Old Testament, one of which caused the Great Flood.” *.

== Criticism ==
Most archaeologists agree that the practice of psychic archaeology can be categorized in the realm of pseudoscience and thus Goodman has received much criticism.

In his book Fantastic Archaeology: The Wild Side of the North American Prehistory, Stephen Williams says “he [Goodman] commits an intellectual crime on the very people he seeks spiritually to uplift with his discoveries, the Native Americans.” Here Williams is referring to Goodman’s excavations of Flagstaff, Arizona and his attempted re-writing of American Indian prehistory

In his review of Goodman’s book The Genesis Mystery, John R. Cole points out many ways in which Goodman succeeds at creating a book that is convincingly scientific. Cole states that “Goodman has succeeded where many before him have failed: he has produced something that mimics a scientific book very well.” He goes on further mentioning figures such as: Barry Fell, Erich von Däniken and Immanuel Velikovsky, stating that Goodman has created a work that “seems to have sound, up-to-date, wide-ranging references to support his claims” unlike the former three. Cole states that Goodman's references are "selective, misused, or misunderstood".

== Bibliography ==
- Psychic Archaeology (1977)
- We are the Earthquake Generation (1978)
- American Genesis (1981)
- The Genesis Mystery (1983)
- The Origins of Mathematics and Science in Prehistoric America (unpublished)
- The Comets of God - New Scientific Evidence for God: Recent archeological, geological and astronomical discoveries that shine new light on the Bible and its prophecies
