= Chasing Nashville =

American reality television series

- Genre: Reality
- Starring: Autumn Blair; Helena Hunt; Lauren Marie Presley; Savannah Little
- Country of origin: United States
- Original language: English
- No. of seasons: 1
- No. of episodes: 4

Production
- Executive producers: Abigail Harvey; Adam Freeman; Adam Reed; Gena McCarthy; Justin Green; Kimberly Chessler; Leslie Greif; Rob Sharenow; Steven Miller
- Running time: 42 minutes
- Production companies: Superfine Films; Thinkfactory Media

Original release
- Network: Lifetime
- Release: October 22 – November 12, 2013

Chasing Nashville is an American reality television series that aired on Lifetime beginning on October 22, 2013, to November 12, 2013. Set in Appalachia, Kentucky, Chasing Nashville chronicles the lives of several girls who are in the pursuit of fame and fortune in country music industry. The series was canceled after four episodes with the remaining episodes uploaded to the series' official website.

== Cast ==
- Autumn Blair
- Helena Hunt
- Lauren Marie Presley
- Savannah Little
- Celeste Turner
- Julia Knight
- Tyra Short
