= Hesketh Hesketh-Prichard =

English explorer, cricketer, and writer (1876–1922)

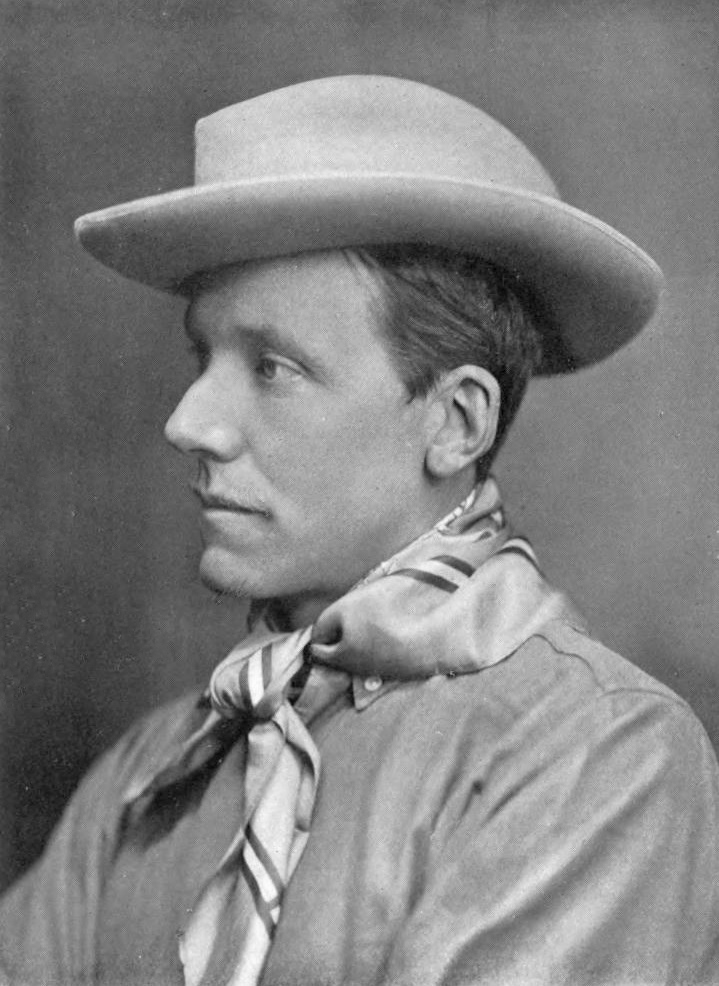
- Hesketh-Prichard in 1910
- Born: Hesketh Vernon Prichard; 17 November 1876; Jhansi, Gwalior State, British India
- Died: 14 June 1922 (aged 45); Gorhambury, Hertfordshire, England
- Known for: Hunter, explorer, writer, cricketer, soldier
- Spouse: Lady Elizabeth Grimston (m. 1908)
- Children: 3
- Cricket career

Cricket information
- Batting: Right-handed
- Bowling: Right-arm fast
- Role: Bowler

Domestic team information
- Years: Team
- 1900–1913: Hampshire
- 1902–1904: London County
- 1904–1913: Marylebone Cricket Club

Career statistics
Competition	First-class
Matches	86
Runs scored	724
Batting average	7.46
100s/50s	–/–
Top score	37
Balls bowled	14547
Wickets	339
Bowling average	22.37
5 wickets in innings	25
10 wickets in match	5
Best bowling	8/32
Catches/stumpings	44/–
- Source: Hesketh Hesketh-Prichard at Cricinfo, 18 March 2024

Hesketh Vernon Prichard, later Hesketh-Prichard, DSO MC FRGS FZS (17 November 1876 – 14 June 1922) was an English cricketer, explorer, adventurer, writer, big-game hunter, and marksman who contributed to sniping practice within the British Army during the First World War. Concerned not only with improving the quality of marksmanship, the measures he introduced to counter the threat of German snipers were credited by a contemporary with saving the lives of over 3,500 Allied soldiers.

He also explored territory never seen before by a European, played cricket at first-class level (taking nearly 340 wickets from 86 appearances), including on overseas tours, wrote short stories and novels in the adventure, mystery, and occult detective genres (one of which was turned into a Douglas Fairbanks film), and was a successful newspaper correspondent and travel writer.

His many activities brought him into the highest social and professional circles. Like other turn-of-the-century hunters such as Theodore Roosevelt (who was an admirer), he was an active campaigner for animal welfare and succeeded in seeing legal measures introduced for their protection.

== Early life ==
Hesketh-Prichard was born an only child on 17 November 1876 in Jhansi, North-Western Provinces, India. His father Hesketh Brodrick Prichard, an officer in the King's Own Scottish Borderers, died from typhoid six weeks before he was born, leading him to be raised alone by his mother, Kate O'Brien Ryall Prichard. She herself had come from a military family, her father being Major-General Browne William Ryall.

Hesketh-Prichard and his mother returned to Great Britain soon after, and lived for a while at her parents' house, before moving to St Helier on Jersey for several years. His nickname was "Hex", which he would bear throughout his life. They returned to the mainland that the boy might be educated at a prep school in Rugby. In 1887 he won a scholarship to Fettes College, Edinburgh; his entrance paper was an essay on "Summer Sports". He excelled at sports there, particularly cricket, at which the school magazine described him as "The best bowler we have had for a long time. Fast right hand with a good break back on a bowler's wicket." He was invited to play for Scotland against South Africa, but declined as he would have been unavailable to play against Fettes' rival Loretto School. After school, he studied law privately in Horsham, West Sussex. He passed the preliminary exam, though he would never practise as a solicitor.

== Writing and exploration ==
=== First publications ===
Hesketh-Prichard, then nineteen, wrote his first story "Tammer's Duel" in the summer of 1896, which his mother helped him refine, and was sold soon after to Pall Mall Magazine for a guinea. That year he abandoned a career in law and spent the summer travelling around southern Europe and North Africa. He spent the sea-time on the trip writing or planning plots. When back in London, he and his mother wrote together under the pseudonyms "H. Heron" and "E. Heron", and saw publication in several journals, including Cornhill Magazine. Hesketh-Prichard's circle of literary friends widened and he became acquainted with the likes of Arthur Conan Doyle and J. M. Barrie. In 1897 Barrie introduced him to the press baron Cyril Arthur Pearson, who suggested he write a series of ghost stories for his monthly Pearson's Magazine. Hesketh-Prichard and his mother created a series of stories around the character "Flaxman Low"', the first psychic detective of fiction, though they were disconcerted to find the tales promoted by Pearson as "real". The collected work was published as The Experiences of Flaxman Low in 1899.

In 1897, he and his mother worked on the plot of A Modern Mercenary, the stories of Captain Rallywood, a dashing diplomat in Germany. It was published by Smith and Elder the following year. He travelled to South America in February 1898, seeing the construction work for the Panama Canal, but returned after developing malaria while in the Caribbean.

=== Commissioned trips ===
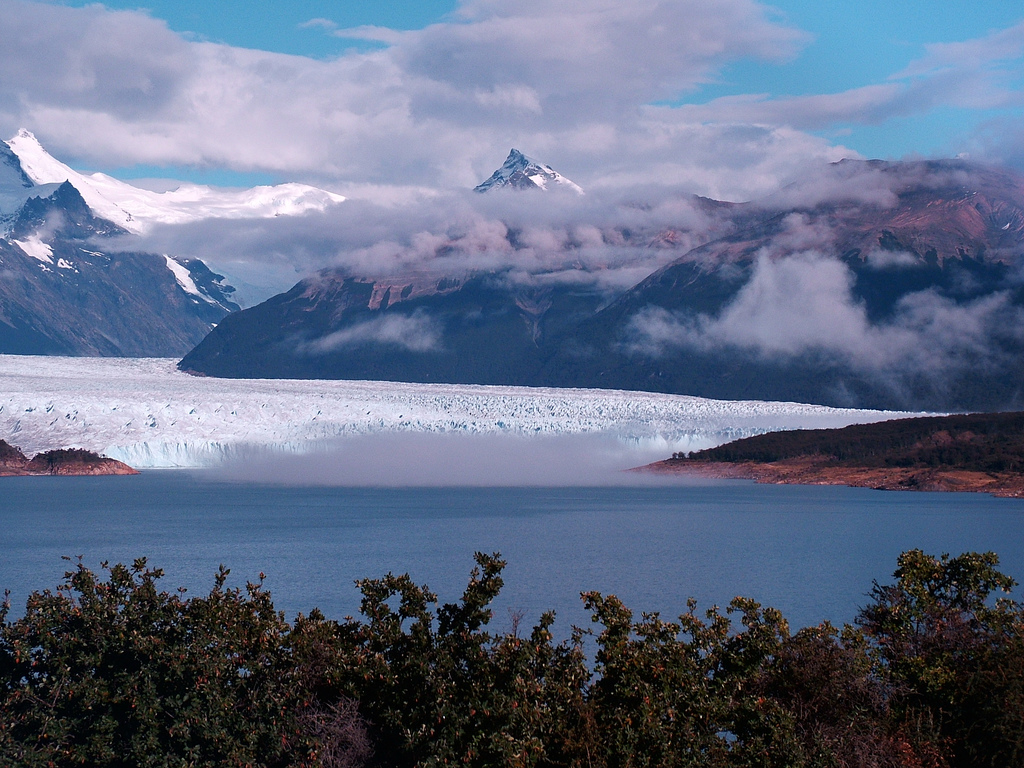
Lake Argentino, Patagonia, which Hesketh-Prichard explored in 1900

In 1899 Pearson chose Hesketh-Prichard to explore and report on the relatively unknown republic of Haiti, wanting something dramatic with which to launch his forthcoming Daily Express. Kate Prichard accompanied her son as far as Jamaica; in later years she would often travel with him to remote destinations in a time when it was uncommon for a woman of her age to do so. Hesketh-Prichard travelled extensively into the uncharted interior of Haiti, narrowly avoiding death when someone tried to poison him. No white man was believed to have crossed the island since 1803, and his trip provided the first written description of some of the secret practices of "vaudoux" (voodoo). He later wrote a vivid account of his travels in the popular book Where Black Rules White: A Journey Across and About Hayti.

Pearson welcomed his reports, and on his return immediately commissioned him to travel to Patagonia to investigate dramatic rumours of a hairy beast roaming the land. The animal was conjectured by Natural History Museum director Ray Lankester to be a living example of the long-extinct giant ground sloth. Hesketh-Prichard's talent for descriptive narration enthralled the readers of the Daily Express. He explored the area surrounding Lake Argentino, finding one of its feeder lakes, naming it Lake Pearson after his patron, and their connecting river Caterina after his mother. Lake Pearson was subsequently renamed Lake Anita, but the Río Caterina, known for its salmon, retains the name Hesketh-Prichard gave it. The surrounding area is now part of Los Glaciares National Park.

Although he found no traces of the creature after a year overseas and 10,000 miles (16,000 km) of travel, he did provide compelling descriptions of unknown areas of the country, its fauna and inhabitants. He acquired the pelt of an unknown subspecies of puma, naming it Felis concolor pearsoni (the puma is now considered to be a variety of the southern South American cougar Puma concolor concolor). The grass species Poa prichardii was named after Hesketh-Prichard after he brought back a specimen. He compiled the story of his travels in the well-received Through the Heart of Patagonia. In 2000, on the hundredth anniversary of both Hesketh-Prichard's trip and the newspaper's founding, the Daily Express despatched his great-grandson Charlie Jacoby to retrace his footsteps.

=== Labrador ===
Hesketh-Prichard first visited Atlantic Canada in August 1903, travelling up the coasts of Labrador and Newfoundland, and donating the heads of stags he had shot to the Newfoundland Exhibition then in London. He returned in October 1904, this time with his mother, and the cricketer Teddy Wynyard. His most ambitious trip to the region was however in July 1910, when he undertook to explore the interior of Labrador, saying "it seemed to us a pity that such a terra incognita should continue to exist under the British flag". This same territory had claimed the life of writer Leonidas Hubbard a few years earlier. He described his journey up the Fraser River to access Indian House Lake on George River in the popular Through Trackless Labrador in 1911. His reputation was such that former President of the United States Theodore Roosevelt, a fellow writer, explorer and hunter, wrote to him, commending him on his latest book, which he described as the best that season, and asking to meet him.

=== Further writing ===
In 1904, the mother-and-son writing team produced The Chronicles of Don Q., a collection of short stories featuring the fictional rogue Don Quebranta Huesos, a Spanish Robin Hood-like figure who was fierce to the evil rich but kind-hearted to the virtuous poor. A second collection, The New Chronicles of Don Q. followed in 1906. The pair produced a full-length novel, Don Q.'s Love Story, in 1909. Don Q. was brought to the stage in 1921 when it was performed at the Apollo Theatre, London. In 1925, the book was reworked as a Zorro vehicle by screenwriters Jack Cunningham and Lotta Woods; the United Artists silent film Don Q, Son of Zorro was produced by Douglas Fairbanks, who also starred as its lead character. The New York Times rated the film one of its top ten movies of the year.

In 1913, writing on his own, Hesketh-Prichard created the crime-fighting figure November Joe, a hunter and backwoodsman from the Canadian wilderness. It was broadcast as a radio play by the BBC on 23 September 1970. In 1921, he wrote Sport in Wildest Britain, in which he shared his experiences of bird shooting, particularly in the Outer Hebrides.

Despite his reputation as a hunter, he campaigned to end the clubbing of grey seals around the coast. Aided by his friend Charles Lyell MP, he was successful in seeing the Grey Seals (Protection) Act passed unopposed in 1914, Britain's first legal protection for non-game mammals. His article "Slaughtered for Fashion" in the March 1914 Pearson's Magazine argued to protect birds from plume hunting, their large-scale slaughter for hat feathers.

== Cricket ==
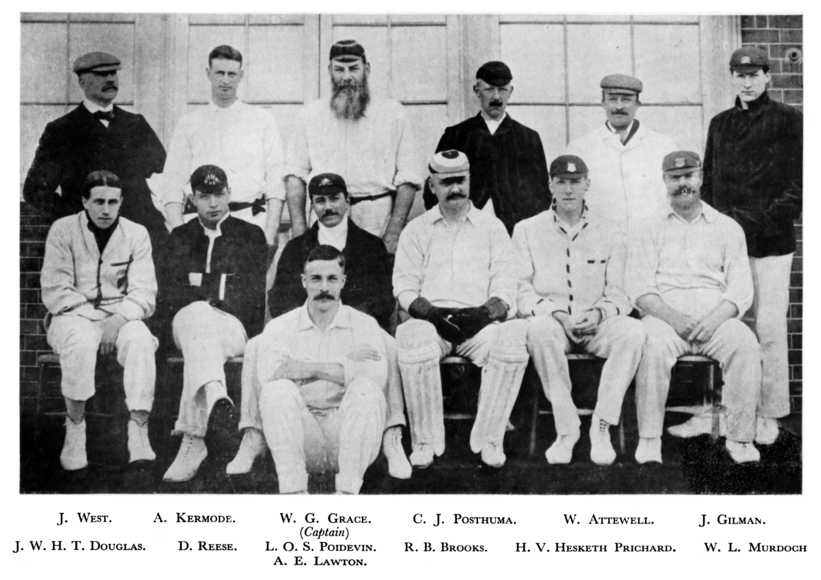
Hesketh-Prichard (front row, 2nd right) with London County, 1903. W.G. Grace is centre-rear.

Hesketh-Prichard was a talented cricketer, who played for a number of major teams. He made his debut in first-class cricket for Hampshire against Somerset at Bath in the 1900 County Championship. He made three further first-class appearances in 1900, before a two-year followed prior to his next first-class match. He made thirteen first-class appearances for Hampshire in 1902, in addition to playing for W. G. Grace's London County against Cambridge University. He took 41 wickets in this season, taking two five wicket hauls. In 1903, he made thirteen first-class appearances, ten of which came for Hampshire; he also made two appearances for London County and played his first match for the Gentlemen in the Gentlemen v Players fixture at Lord's. 1903 saw him take 56 wickets, whilst taking a five wicket haul on five occasions. In 1904, he appeared in twenty first-class matches, and had his best season as a bowler. He passed 100 wickets for the season for the only time, with 106 wickets at an average of 21.92, with nine five wicket hauls. He again played for London County and the Gentlemen in 1904, in addition to playing for the Marylebone Cricket Club (MCC), the Gentlemen of England, and for the South against the touring South Africans.

In the winter which followed the 1904 season, he toured the West Indies with Lord Brackley's XI's, making five first-class appearances during the tour. He featured for Hampshire with less regularity between 1905 and 1907, but continued to feature for the MCC, Gentlemen, and the Gentlemen of England. It was during the 1905 season that he would take his career best figures of 8 for 32 against Derbyshire, with overall match figures of 13 for 78. Having featured just once for Hampshire in 1907 against Middlesex, Hesketh-Prichard toured North America with the MCC late in the 1907 season, making two first-class appearances on the tour against the Gentlemen of Philadelphia, before making a single first-class appearance for the MCC against the Gentlemen of Philadelphia at Lord's in 1908. A four-year gap would follow before he next appeared in first-class cricket, when he made five appearances for Hampshire in the County Championship and two for the MCC, taking 28 wickets during that season. The following season, he concluded his first-class career with six appearances for Hampshire and one for the MCC against Oxford University, taking 23 wickets.

A tall man, he was able to use his height and reach to his advantage when bowling his right-arm fast deliveries, particularly in relation to his ability to exact quick bounce off the pitch. In sixty first-class matches for Hampshire, he took 233 wickets at an average of 23.45, taking fifteen five wicket hauls and ten wickets in a match on four occasions. His overall first-class career saw him play 86 matches, taking 339 wickets at an average of 22.37, with 25 five wicket hauls. He was not however a strong batsman and would typically play in the tail of the batting order, scoring 724 runs across his first-class career at a batting average of 7.46.

== Military service ==
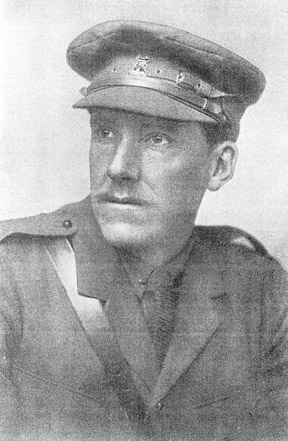
Hesketh-Prichard in World War I uniform

At the outbreak of the First World War, Hesketh-Prichard tried for a commission in the Black Watch and Guards, but both turned him down because of his age, then 37. He was eventually successful obtaining a post as Assistant Press Officer at the War Office, and first sent to the front lines in France in February 1915 as an "eyewitness officer" in charge of war correspondents. By this time, open warfare on the front had ceased, and had stagnated into the trench warfare that characterised much of the conflict. He witnessed there the victims of gas attack.

Hesketh-Prichard was dismayed by the poor quality of marksmanship amongst the British troops and shocked to learn of the high attrition rate due to well-trained German snipers. It was common for British regiments to lose five men a day to snipers; he learned that one battalion lost eighteen in a single day. The German snipers could not be located, leaving them free to continue shooting from their place of concealment. He thus set about improving the quality of marksmanship, calibrating and correcting the few telescopic sights that the army already possessed. He borrowed more sights and hunting rifles from friends and famous hunters back home, funded the acquisition of others from his own pocket, or donations he solicited. To investigate the quality of German armour plate, he retrieved a sample from a German trench. He discovered that their armour could only be penetrated by a heavy cartridge such as Jeffery 333, while British plate could be easily defeated by a much smaller gun such as a Mauser.

=== Innovations ===
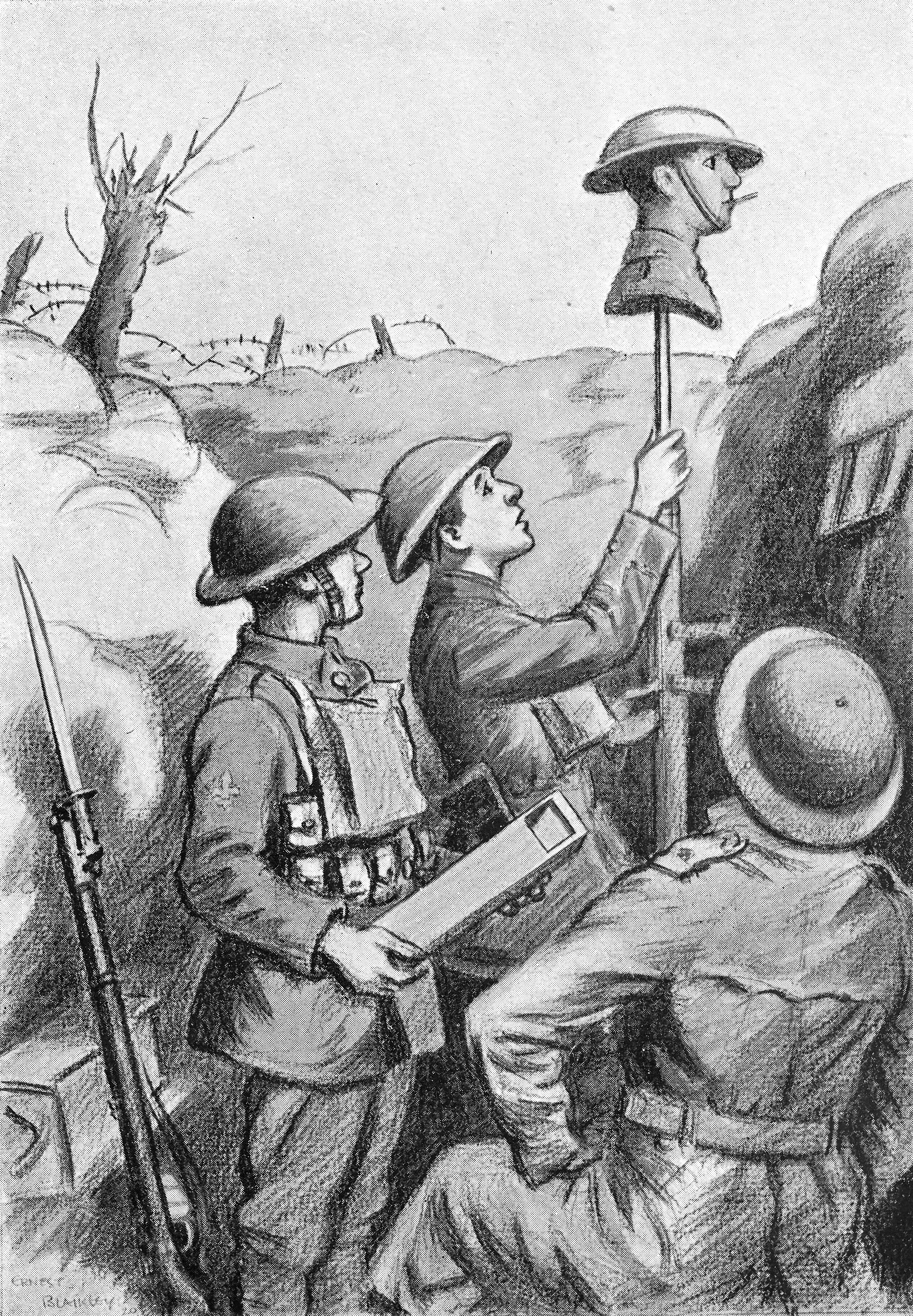
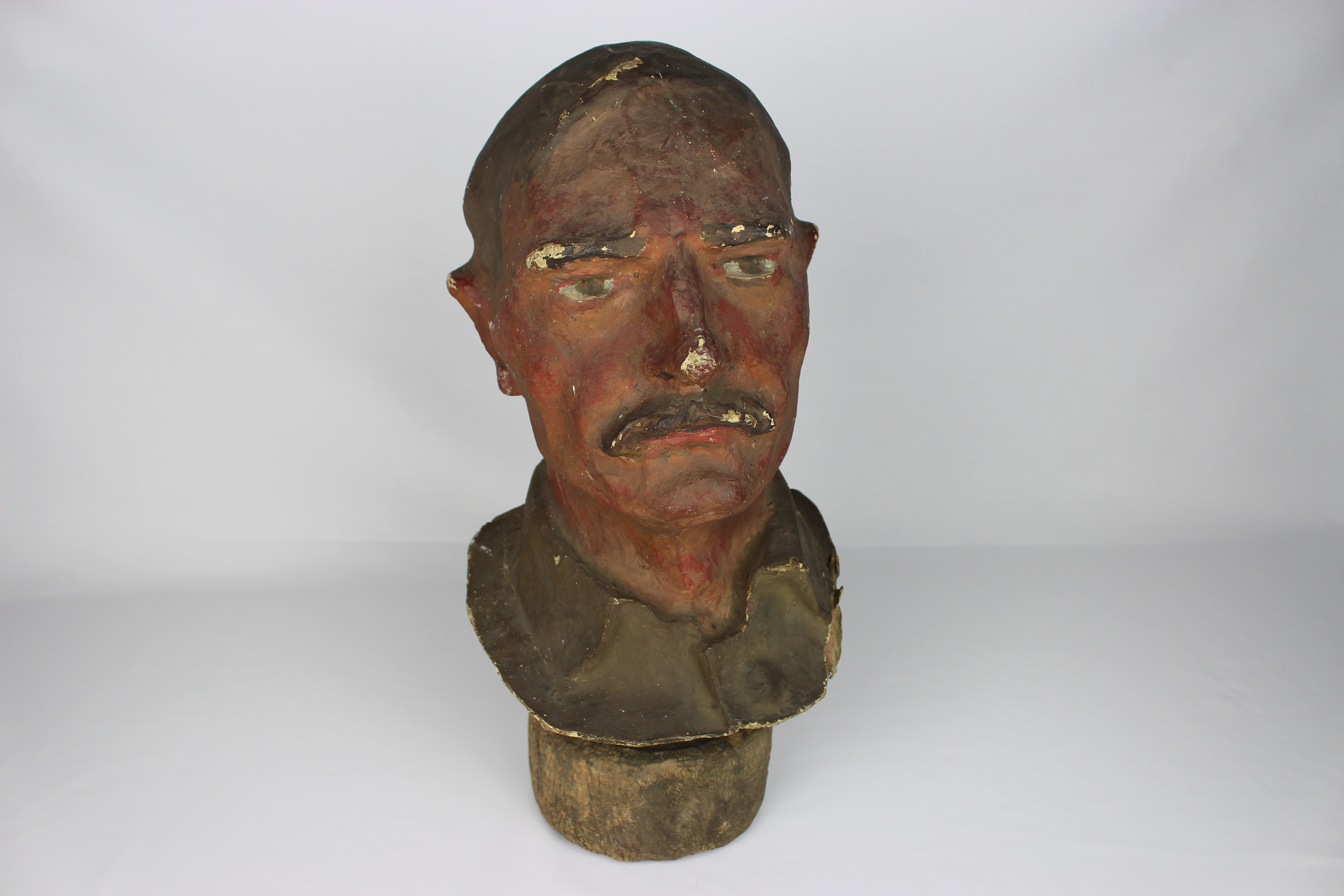
Top: soldiers raise a dummy head to locate an enemy sniper, illustration from Sniping in France (1920). Bottom: a rare example of a sniper's dummy head that survived the conflict, York Castle Museum.

He recognised German skill in constructing trench parapets: by making use of an irregular top and face to the parapet, and constructing it from material of varying composition, the presence of a sniper or an observer poking his head up became much less conspicuous. In contrast, British trench practice had been to give a military-straight neat edge to the parapet top, making any movement or protrusion immediately obvious. An observer was vulnerable to an enemy sniper firing a bullet through his loophole, but Hesketh-Prichard devised a metal-armoured double loophole that would protect him. The front loophole was fixed, but the rear was housed in a metal shutter sliding in grooves. Only when the two loopholes were lined up—a one-to-twenty chance—could an enemy shoot between them.

Another innovation was the use of a dummy head to find the location of an enemy sniper. Initially, realistic papier-mâché heads were supplied to Hesketh-Prichard by the famous London theatrical wig and costume maker, Willy Clarkson. These false heads were raised above the parapet on a stick running in a groove on a fixed board. To increase the realism, a lit cigarette could be inserted into the dummy's mouth and be smoked by a soldier via a rubber tube. If the head was shot, it was dropped rapidly, simulating a casualty. The sniper's bullet would have made a hole in the front and back of the dummy's head. The head was then raised in the groove again, but lower than before by the vertical distance between the glasses of a trench periscope. If the lower glass of a periscope was placed before the front bullet hole, its upper glass would be at exactly the same height as the bullet had been. By looking through the rear hole in the head, through the front hole and up through the periscope, the soldier would be looking exactly along the line the bullet had taken, and so would be looking directly at the sniper, revealing his position.

=== Training snipers ===
Hesketh-Prichard was eventually successful in gaining official support for his campaign, and in August 1915 was given permission to proceed with formalised sniper training. By November of that year, his reputation was such that he was in high demand from many units. In December, he was ordered on General Allenby's request to the Third Army School of Instruction and was made a general staff officer with the rank of captain. He was mentioned in dispatches on 1 January 1916. In August 1916, he founded the First Army School of Sniping in the village of Linghem, Pas-de-Calais. Starting with a first class of only six, in time he was able to lecture to large numbers of soldiers from different Allied nations, proudly proclaiming in a letter that his school was turning out snipers at three times the rate of any such other school in the world. In October of that year he was awarded the Military Cross, the citation of which read:

"For conspicuous gallantry and devotion to duty. He has instructed snipers in the trenches on many occasions, and in most dangerous circumstances, with great skill and determination. He has, directly and indirectly, inflicted enormous casualties on the enemy."

His friend George Gray, himself a champion shooter, told him that he had reduced sniping casualties from five a week per battalion to forty-four in three months in sixty battalions; by his reckoning, this meant that Hesketh-Prichard had saved over 3,500 lives. He was promoted to major in November 1916. By this time in the war, his contributions to sniping had been such that the former German superiority in the practice had now been reversed.

=== Later war years ===
Hesketh-Prichard was taken ill with an undetermined infection in late 1917 and was granted leave. His health remained poor for the rest of his life, and he spent much of it convalescing. It was during this period of leave that he learned that he had been awarded the Distinguished Service Order, for his work with the First Army School of Sniping, Observation, and Scouting. For his wartime work with the Portuguese Expeditionary Corps, he was appointed a Commander of the Military Order of Avis. In 1920, he wrote his account of his wartime activities: the critically acclaimed Sniping in France, which is still referred to by modern authors on the subject.

== Later years ==
In July 1919, Hesketh-Prichard was elected Chairman of the Society of Authors, of which he had been a member for many years. Poor health forced him to resign the following January. Following his war service, he continued to write and hunt when his health permitted him.

Hesketh-Prichard died from sepsis on 14 June 1922, at Old Gorhambury House, the ancestral home of his wife in Hertfordshire, England. His obituarists ascribed this to an obscure form of blood poisoning brought on by gassing in the trenches during his war service. However, his ailments, including fatigue, heart–digestive–neurological disorders, appendicitis, cognitive problems, depression, anxiety – are today recognised as differential symptoms of malaria. Left untreated they sometimes lead to organ failure and death. His body was cremated and the ashes interred in the family vault at St Michael's Church, St Albans.

His mother survived him, dying in 1935. His wife, who later became Woman of the Bedchamber to Queen Mary, lived until 1975. Hesketh-Prichard's biography was written two years after his death by his friend Eric Parker, who encapsulated his many accomplishments within its title: Hesketh Prichard D.S.O., M.C.: Explorer, Naturalist, Cricketer, Author, Soldier.

== Family life ==
In 1908, Hesketh Hesketh-Prichard married Lady Elizabeth Grimston, the daughter of James Grimston, 3rd Earl of Verulam, whom he had met through friends. They had three children: Michael (19 February 1909 – September 1988), Diana (26 March 1912 – 1970), and Alfred Cecil Giles (1916–1944), known as "Alfgar". Alfgar, recruited to the Special Operations Executive during the Second World War, became the first head of its Czech Section, training agents to conduct the assassination of Reinhard Heydrich. Alfgar Hesketh-Prichard was killed by Yugoslav Partisans in Austria on 3 December 1944 and was posthumously awarded the Military Cross.

== Bibliography ==
- Hesketh-Prichard, Hesketh (1920). Sniping in France, with notes on the scientific training of scouts, observers, and snipers . London: Hutchinson & Co. ISBN 0850524261.
- Hesketh-Prichard, Hesketh (1902). Through the Heart of Patagonia. New York City: D. Appleton & Company.
- Hesketh-Prichard, Hesketh (1911). Through Trackless Labrador. London: Heinemann.
- Hesketh-Prichard, Hesketh (1900). Where Black Rules White: A journey across and about Hayti (PDF). New York City: Charles Scribner's Sons.
- Parker, Eric (1924). Hesketh Prichard D.S.O., M.C.: Explorer, Naturalist, Cricketer, Author, Soldier:A Memoir. London: T. Fisher Unwin.
- Sweetman, Simon (2012). H.V. Hesketh-Prichard: Amazing Stories. Cardiff: ACS Publications. ISBN 9781908165213.
