= Psychic Detectives =

- Genre: Crime, reality television
- Narrated by: Les Marshak
- Country of origin: United States
- Original language: English
- No. of seasons: 5

Original release
- Network: Court TV
- Release: 2003 – 2006

Psychic Detectives or Psychic Investigators is a television program produced by StoryHouse Productions for Court TV. The program documents real-life cases of situations in which police departments have enlisted the aid of psychics in solving difficult cases. The series production does not investigate the claims of the psychics showcased or confirm their claims. For entertainment it instead recreates some of the atmosphere surrounding psychic claims using a selection of well recognized intuitives, crime psychics, psychic detectives and supporters of paranormal beliefs. A cross section of paranormal psychics are profiled though most are women who typically are engaged as self-described psychic mediums communicating with the dead. Robyn Hutt was executive producer.

The show premiered as a one-time one-hour episode on February 27, 2003, with Andrea Thompson as host and produced by Superfine Films. It was directed by Lisa F. Jackson who also co-produced with Stephen Miller.

Court TV launched the series Psychic Detectives in February 2004 and due to its success, the channel ordered fifteen more episodes for the 2005 season. One of the first episodes examined the 1983 murder of Anna Marie Turetzky. "Psychic detective" Noreen Renier from Florida was brought in. NBC made a deal to show 8 episodes of the half-hour show, Psychic Detectives, combined into 4 hour-long shows for the 2005 summer. The series showed increasing ratings and high engagement going into the Fall 2005 season.

Robert Thompson, founding director of Syracuse University's Bleier Center for Television and Popular Culture said "This is 'The X Files' meets 'Law and Order,'" adding "This takes the natural interest in something science has not been able to explain and packages it in an entertainment kind of way. It's pretty seductive." "It's a procedural crime show but here instead of forensic evidence, it's this psychic stuff," Thompson said. "It's been given a sense of legitimacy, not the same kind as DNA is given but pretty much the same as a lie detector is." Some were disappointed that Court TV had a show on "psychic detectives" and called it "pseudoscience". Randall Skelton, who teaches forensics at University of Montana, wrote "that this runs on Court TV network is disturbing, because it gives the impression that this pursuit is authentic and approved by the court system. Nothing could be farther from the truth." The Center for Inquiry's Independent Investigations Group awarded Psychic Detectives its 1st Annual IIG Award for Truly Terrible Television in 2007. And Gary P. Posner, founder of Tampa Bay Skeptics, has critiqued several episodes of the program in which fellow Floridian Noreen Renier is featured.

== Cast ==
- Les Marshak (Narrator)
- Phil Jordan (Himself)
- Noreen Renier (Herself)
- Rosemarie Kerr (Herself)
- Carole Pate (Herself)

== Broadcasters ==
Country	TV channel(s) Series premiere	Weekly schedule	
Italy	Mediaset TOPcrime		June 1, 2013 at 6:40am
Australia	Channel Seven		Mondays 12.10am
Canada	Court TV Canada		Thursdays 9:55
Japan	Fox 8Japan		
United States	Bio; Discovery en Español; Justice Network		
United Kingdom	Bio; TruTV		
