= Psychic detective =

Person who investigates crimes by using purported psychic abilities

A psychic detective is a person who purports to investigate crimes using paranormal psychic abilities. Claimed techniques and abilities have included postcognition (paranormal perception of the past), psychometry (information psychically gained from objects), telepathy, dowsing, clairvoyance, and remote viewing. In murder cases, psychic detectives may purport to be in communication with the spirits of the murder victims.

Individuals claiming psychic abilities have stated they have helped police departments to solve crimes, however, there is a lack of police corroboration of their claims. Many police departments around the world have released official statements saying that they do not regard psychics as credible or useful on cases.

== Prominent cases ==
Many prominent police cases, often involving missing persons, have received the attention of alleged psychics. In November 2004, purported psychic Sylvia Browne told the mother of kidnapping victim Amanda Berry, who had disappeared 19 months earlier: "She's not alive, honey." Browne also claimed to have had a vision of Berry's jacket in the garbage with "DNA on it". Berry's mother died two years later believing that her daughter had been killed; Berry was found alive in May 2013 having been a kidnapping victim of Ariel Castro along with Michelle Knight and Gina DeJesus. After Berry was found alive, Browne received criticism for the false declaration that Berry was dead. Browne also became involved in the case of Shawn Hornbeck, which received the attention of psychics after the eleven-year-old went missing on 6 October 2002. Browne appeared on The Montel Williams Show and provided the parents of Shawn Hornbeck a detailed description of the abductor and where Hornbeck could be found. Browne responded "No" when asked if he was still alive. When Hornbeck was found alive more than four years later, few of the details given by Browne were correct. Shawn Hornbeck's father, Craig Akers, has stated that Browne's declaration was "one of the hardest things that we've ever had to hear", and that her misinformation diverted investigators wasting precious police time.

When Washington, D.C. intern Chandra Levy went missing on 1 May 2001, psychics from around the world provided tips suggesting that her body would be found in places such as the basement of a Smithsonian storage building, in the Potomac River, and buried in the Nevada desert among many other possible locations. Each tip led nowhere. A little more than a year after her disappearance, Levy's body was accidentally discovered by a man walking his dog in a remote section of Rock Creek Park.

Following the disappearance of Elizabeth Smart on 5 June 2002, the police received as many as 9,000 tips from psychics (and others crediting visions and dreams as their source). Responding to these tips took "many police hours", according to Salt Lake City Police Chief Lieutenant Chris Burbank. Yet, Elizabeth Smart's father, Ed Smart, concluded that: "the family didn't get any valuable information from psychics". Smart was located by observant witnesses who recognized her abductor from a police photograph. No psychic was ever credited with finding Elizabeth Smart.

In the case of the Long Island serial killer, the psychic said the body would be found in a shallow grave, near water and a sign with a G in it would be nearby. Despite the vagueness of this claim (the body was not in a shallow grave, water is everywhere in Long Island, and no sign with a G was nearby) the New York Post stated that the "Psychic Nailed it!". Describing the case, skeptic and author Benjamin Radford wrote: "more surprising than the psychic's failure is the fact that this information was described as an amazing success on over 70,000 websites without anyone realizing that she was completely wrong".

A body was located in the US by psychic Annette Martin. Dennis Prado, a retired US paratrooper, had gone missing from his apartment and police had been unable to locate his whereabouts. With no further leads, the chief investigating officer, Fernando Realyvasquez, a sergeant with the Pacifica (California) Police, contacted psychic detective Annette Martin. Prado had lived near a large forest, some 2000 square miles. Martin was given a map, she circled a small spot on the map, about the size of two city blocks. She said that Prado had struggled for breath, had died, and his body would be there within the indicated area. She described the path he took, and where the body would be found. Although the area had been searched before and Prado had not been found, a search and rescue officer initiated a new search with the help of a search dog, as Martin suggested "A search dog is going to find him." They found the body covered with dirt at the location, as Martin had indicated. While the body had deteriorated, there was no evidence that he had been attacked and it is thought that he had likely died of natural causes, as she also indicated. However, when Joe Nickell, a columnist for Skeptical Inquirer magazine, was shown tapes of Martin at work, he stated he was "underwhelmed". Regarding the Prado case, he noted that "What she did was very shrewdly ask all kinds of questions of that police officer, who helped her even further and told her all kinds of things. It's probably perfectly sincere, not an act. But it's just the facility of a highly imaginative and emotional person and doesn't mean anything scientifically".

In August 2010, Aboriginal elder Cheryl Carroll-Lagerwey claimed to have seen the location of a missing child, Kiesha Abrahams, in her dream. The missing child's disappearance was being investigated by police. She took them to a location where a dead body was found, however it was of an adult woman and not the body of the child.

In Sydney, Australia, in 1996, a Belgian-born Sydney psychic, Phillipe Durant was approached by the fiancé of missing Paula Brown to help locate her. Durante told police the location of the body of Brown. She was found less than two kilometres from the spot he had indicated in Port Botany, New South Wales, by a lorry driver who came across the body. "Even though the body was discovered purely by chance, the speculation by a clairvoyant appears to have been uncannily accurate", a police spokeswoman conceded. Durant had used a plumb bob and a grid map, combined with some hair from the victim.

In 2001, the body of Thomas Braun was located by Perth-based Aboriginal clairvoyant Leanna Adams in Western Australia. Police had initially been unable to find the body. The family of Braun had been told to contact Adams, an Aboriginal psychic who lived in Perth. The Braun family had requested police to do a search based on Adams's directions but they had not assisted. Adams went to Alice Springs, in the Northern Territory, which was 3600 kilometres away from her home in Perth. She took the family members directly to Braun's remains, a spot high on a ridge west of the town, some 20 kilometres out. The remains were not immediately identifiable. Police later confirmed the remains to be his using DNA testing.

Noreen Renier claimed to have solved the murder of Kimberly McAndrew, who disappeared on August 12, 1989. Six years after McAndrew went missing, in October 1995 the Halifax Regional Police hired Renier to help. Renier gave the police three interviews which were recorded and years later obtained for review by Tampa Bay Skeptics founder Gary P. Posner. Using psychometry, Renier claimed to channel the murder victim. After a long analysis of the tapes, Posner states that Renier took the detectives on a "wild goose chase". Renier's clues were misleading, vague or incoherent, leading to nothing solid that could be verified. Renier assured the police that the body would be found soon, before Christmas of that year (1995), saying it would be "a nice Christmas present for everybody". But decades later it has yet to be located, and as of 2026 the Government of the Province of Nova Scotia is still offering rewards of up to $150,000 for information leading to the arrest and conviction of the person(s) responsible for Kimberly's disappearance.

In 2023, Charlotte Sena was reported missing from a campground in Moreau Lake State Park in Saratoga County, New York resulting in a huge search effort involving over 400 people, including teams from the New York State Police, New York State Park Police, Forest Rangers, the FBI, and other agencies. Suspecting a possible abduction case, the State Police put the family's home under surveillance, and after a suspicious vehicle drew attention of the police, a ransom note was found in the family's mailbox. Forensic evidence was soon matched to Ballston Spa resident Craig Nelson Ross Jr. (born March 17, 1977), who had a previous criminal history and was living about eighteen miles away from the campground where Sena was found safe and Ross was arrested. A segment from WNYT NewsChannel 13 called "Psychic helps police, family of a kidnapped girl" featured Christine Seebold-Walrath, a self-styled psychic medium. In the segment, journalist Dan Levy claimed that Seebold-Walrath was in touch with the New York State Police and the victim's family during the ordeal, implying she helped with the investigation. However, skeptic Kenny Biddle, chief investigator at the Center For Inquiry, contacted the Saratoga office of the New York State Police and spoke to Officer Stephanie O'Neil who explained whenever information pertaining to a kidnapping, missing person, or homicide is released, they always receive many calls from alleged psychics and that police must follow up on every tip. When asked directly by Biddle, O'Neil said that Seebold-Walrath did not provide any information that helped with the case. Ross was later sentenced to 47 years in prison the following year, and was currently confining his sentence at the Attica Correctional Facility in Attica.

== Official police responses ==
Many police departments around the world have released official statements saying that they do not regard psychics as credible or useful on cases.

=== In Australia ===
Australian police, officially, in general have said that they do not accept assistance from psychics. This was in response to an Australian TV show Sensing Murder in which psychics attempt to crack unsolved murders. Western Australian Police have a policy that they do not contact psychics for assistance with investigations, however they will accept information contributed by psychics. An unnamed Australian federal police officer was suspended following his seeking the aid of a clairvoyant in regard to death threats made against Prime Minister John Howard. A federal police spokesman said they do "not condone the use of psychics in security matters". There are still cases of psychics professing to have trained with the Australian police and failing to provide credible evidence to support qualifications or evidence of being a psychic profiler or intuitive profiler with the Australian police.

While official policy for police forces in Australia does not advocate the use of psychics for investigations, one former Detective Senior Constable, Jeffrey Little, has said police do use them "even though they officially say they don't". Additionally, police in NSW have used psychic Debbie Malone on a number of cases. While no evidence she has supplied has solved murders or missing investigations on their own, her evidence had been used to corroborate theories, and in one case, included in a coroner's brief on a case. Little, in reference to one case she assisted on, felt her description of what happened was "exceptional", other officers also had been impressed by her assistance, while yet other NSW officers felt she had not helped solve any cases. Sergeant Gae Crea and Detective Sergeant Damian Loone, state that she did not give them anything the police and the public didn't already know. Crea recounts "I've dealt with a lot of psychics, but no one has ever said, 'I can see where the body is buried and I'll take you there'".

=== In New Zealand ===
New Zealand police have said "spiritual communications were not considered a creditable foundation for investigation".

=== In the United Kingdom ===
In 2006, 28 British police forces responded to a query from the Association for Rational Inquiry to say that they did not and have never used psychics, one force saying "We are unaware of any inquiries significantly progressed solely by information provided by a psychic medium." In 2009, when the Metropolitan Police had denied the use of psychics and were then presented with emails suggesting the use of a psychic they made a press statement authorized by the senior investigating officer that was much more ambiguous: "We do not identify people we may or may not speak with in connection with inquiries. We are not prepared to discuss this further."

=== In the United States ===
A 1993 survey of police departments in the 50 largest cities in the United States revealed that a third of them had accepted predictions from psychic detectives in the past, although only 7 departments treated such information any differently from information from ordinary sources. No police department reported any instances of a psychic investigator providing information that was more helpful than other information received during the course of a case; since any information has to be proved, only information matching other evidence could be used. A follow-up study looking at small and medium-sized cities in the United States, found that psychics were called upon by the police departments of those cities even less frequently than large cities. A former senior investigator for the FBI has stated that psychics may be used "as a last resort [and] as an investigative tool with caution" for providing clues not directly admissible in the court of law such as a criminal's character, or the location of dead bodies.

== Scientific studies ==
A number of tests have been conducted on psychics detectives, using control groups, to try to establish any psychic ability relating to crime solving. One of the earliest was carried out by Dutch Police officer, Filippus Brink in 1960. He conducted a year-long study of psychics, but found no evidence of any crime-solving abilities. Another study was conducted in 1982 where evidence from four crimes was given to three groups: psychic detectives, students and police detectives. The clues related to four crimes, two crimes that had been solved, and two that had not been. The study found no difference between the three groups in ability to indicate what crimes had been committed by looking at the evidence. Some flaws in the scientific method were apparent in these two tests. A further test was conducted in 1997, this test focusing on improving on the scientific methods used in the previous tests. This study used two groups, one consisting of three students from the University of Hertfordshire, the other group consisting of three psychics (two psychic detectives and a non-detective psychic who had a media profile and had been endorsed by police due to his abilities). The two groups were shown three objects associated with three serious crimes. They then advocated theories, but once again, no difference was found in terms of the accuracy between the two groups.

To assess the claims of psychic crime-solving, the Committee for the Scientific Investigation of Claims of the Paranormal (now Committee for Skeptical Inquiry) established a task force of investigators. The group recorded many failures by psychics to provide useful information to criminal investigators, and felt that psychics may use "retrofitting" (or after-the-fact matching), offering vague clues, and then trying to retroactively fit them to details that are only discovered later. In addition to cases of retrofitting, the apparent use of cold reading (a psychic's fishing for information while appearing to gain it paranormally), exaggeration, and examples where the psychic has used non-psychic sources of information, were also reviewed.

In 2008, while being interviewed for the Skeptiko podcast, managing editor of Skeptical Inquirer, Ben Radford challenged the host, Alex Tsakiris, to give him the best case for evidence of a psychic solving a crime. As Tsakiris had "repeatedly accused skeptical investigators of purposely choosing the weakest cases", Radford agreed to investigate in depth a case from any period in history, around the world, "that presented the gold standard for evidence". Tsakiris chose psychic Nancy Weber who, in 2006, appeared on an episode of the Biography Channel Psychic Investigators. Weber claimed to have helped the New Jersey police solve the 1982 serial murders of Amie Hoffman and Dierdre O'Brien. The police arrested James Koedatich in 1983 who was later found guilty of serial murder. Psychic Investigators interviewed Weber as well as the two police detectives she worked with, Hughes and Moore, who verified Weber had given them information "she could not have known". Radford spent the next nine months reviewing the case, and he and Tsakiris re-interviewed the detectives as well as the psychic on the Skeptiko podcast. Radford discovered that the detectives had not kept their notes from the case, and that their story had changed since the TV show aired. In fact, he found that their stories now contradicted the psychic's story on several points. A further discovery by Radford using a New Jersey phone book from 1982 found that if the psychic had indeed given the detectives all the evidence she claimed she had, the police could have discovered the killer with a 20-minute search through the phone book. Radford believes that the police and the psychic "simply fell prey to confirmation bias", however, Tsakiris believes Radford's conclusions and publicized information was a "gross misrepresentation".

== Critical commentary ==
In 2023, the podcast, Worldwide: The Disappearance of the Thai Silk King, released an episode featuring a professional skeptic discussing the dangers of psychic detectives getting involved in missing person cases. The episode examines Peter Hurkos and Sylvia Brown, in particular, and categorizes and demystifies psychics and their manipulation tools.

ABC's Nightline Beyond Belief program for 17 August 2011 featured psychic detectives and their involvement with the case of Ali Lowitzer. Typical of missing person cases, families are approached by people claiming they will help bring the missing home. "They told me, I see trees, water, dirt... but it is all very vague" according to Susan Lowitzer a mother whose daughter has been missing since 26 April 2010. Retired FBI agent and ABC consultant Brad Garrett states, "In 30 years...I have never seen a psychic solve a mystery", while Bob Nygaard, a retired 20-year veteran of the Nassau County police department and currently a private investigator specializing in the investigation of psychics, noted that he had not worked with, nor did he know of anyone on the force who had worked with, any psychic detectives.

JREF investigator and mentalist Banachek feels that psychic detectives take advantage of families, "... because of fame and money, [they] step in and try to act like an authority". Banachek believes that not all psychic detectives are frauds, some are self-deluded and believe they are helping, but they "send police on wild-goose chases wasting precious time and resources". Psychic Georgia O'Conner states that Ali is dead, she was tortured and her body dismembered. When asked by ABC's JuJu Chang how can she tell parents this kind of information when she might be wrong, O'Conner replies "I can't let my ego get in the way of what I see". Despite the attention from psychic detectives Ali Lowitzer remains missing from her Spring, Texas home.

No psychic detective has ever been praised or given official recognition by the FBI or US national news for solving a crime, preventing a crime, or finding a kidnap victim or corpse.

The Australian Institute of Criminology, Australia's official crime research agency, advises parents of missing children not to resort to using psychics who approach them. Former FBI analyst and profiler Clint Van Zandt has criticized the use of psychic detectives and has stated that "What happens many times is that professed psychics allow themselves the benefit of 20/20 hindsight. After the case is solved, they make their previously vague predictions somehow fit the crime and the criminal." A detailed 2010 study of Sylvia Browne predictions about 115 missing persons and murder cases has found that despite her repeated claims to be more than 85% correct, "Browne has not even been mostly correct in a single case."

== Belief in psychic detectives ==
Psychologists, researchers and other authors have posited a number of possible explanations for the belief that some can provide valuable crime information from psychic abilities. The possible explanations include confirmation bias (or our natural tendency to favor information to confirm our beliefs), wishful thinking (which is the act of making decisions based upon what is appealing rather than reasoned), and retrofitting (or retroactively refining the specifics of a prediction after the facts are revealed). The act of reinterpreting vague and nebulous statements made by psychic detectives is also referred to as the multiple out. Taking advantage of these cognitive limitations is the practice of cold reading which creates the illusion of knowing specific information. Additionally, police detectives and other authors suggest that psychic detectives appear successful due to making common-sense or high-probability predictions such as finding bodies at dump sites or "near water".

While police departments claim they do not seek out or use psychics to solve crimes, they must follow up on all credible tips. If police do not refute this theory then "many in the public continue to believe that psychics are secretly employed by law enforcement". If the police state they do not use psychics then psychics claim that the police do not want to "share the credit" and are just covering up.

Finally, the use of psychics may simply reduce anxiety and fill the emotional needs of individuals who must be experiencing great stress.

== In fiction ==
There is a long history of psychic detectives in horror and crime fiction, and in other genres as well. One of the earliest forms of the genre was the character Flaxman Low, created in 1897 by mother and son Kate and Hesketh Hesketh-Prichard under the pseudonyms H. Heron and E. Heron. The Prichards wrote their stories at the behest of the press baron Cyril Pearson for his monthly Pearson's Magazine, though they were disconcerted to find the tales promoted by Pearson as "real". The collected work was published as The Experiences of Flaxman Low in 1899.

Other literary examples include Jules de Grandin (created by Seabury Quinn), Doctor Occult (created by Jerry Siegel and Joe Shuster) and Agent Jasi McLellan created by Cheryl Kaye Tardif.

The popular TV show Psych features Shawn Spencer (James Roday Rodriguez), a charlatan paranormal detective helping the Santa Barbara police with crimes that range from robberies to kidnappings to murders. However, the man actually uses an acute sense of observation that he acquired as a child; an eidetic memory; excellent vision; and deduction and reasoning to solve cases, making a running gag of his claim to be a psychic.

In Douglas Adams's Dirk Gently novels, the titular character—a "holistic" detective—is implied to have psychic powers on occasion. One incident involved Gently attempting to scam his university classmates into paying for a set of answers to an exam, supposedly obtained using psychic powers that Gently did not think he had. To his surprise, the answers he provided, which he thought he had produced randomly, turned out to be entirely correct. He was expelled as a result.

Peter F. Hamilton wrote a series of books about the ex-military psychic Greg Mandel. In the series, Greg was a retired special forces soldier created as part of an elite spec-ops unit, the Mindstar Brigade, in the 'English Army', having fought a vicious war in Turkey and helped a rebellion overthrow the People's Socialist Party at home. Having won the rebellion he then retired to Rutland, suddenly being called out of retirement by the rich heiress Julia Evans to use his psychic talents to find the root of industrial espionage against her company, Event Horizon [an organisation that was also integral to the overthrow of the communist government]. The series not only focuses on Greg's abilities, but also the abilities of other psychics created as part of the Mindstar Programme, the effects of social and economic change throughout the 21st century, global warming and rapid scientific advances. Greg regularly uses his abilities both for interrogation and as an offensive weapon.

The episode "Bart the Murderer" of The Simpsons depicts a psychic joining the hunt to find Principal Skinner.

The episode "Cartman's Incredible Gift" of South Park depicts a skeptical view of psychic detectives.

The manga and anime series YuYu Hakusho depicts a teenage boy working as a Spirit Detective: a human who hunts down demons using psychic abilities.

The character Harrier Dubois from Disco Elysium has several skills that can be interpreted as psychic, such as visual calculus which can reconstruct crime scenes.

== See also ==
- Fortune-telling fraud
- Houdini's debunking of psychics and mediums
- Parapsychology
- Psychic
- Psychic archaeology
- Ganzfeld experiment
- Scientific investigation of telepathy
- Pseudoscience
- List of topics characterized as pseudoscience
- Marcello Truzzi
- Committee for Skeptical Inquiry
- Gerard Croiset
- Janet Lee

== Literature ==
- Richard Wiseman, Donald West & Roy Stemman: "An experimental test of psychic detection". In: Journal of the Society for Psychical Research. 1996, 61(842), 34–45 (PDF)
