= Frederick Bligh Bond =

British architect, illustrator, archaeologist

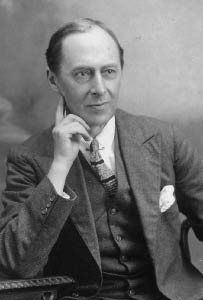
- Frederick Bligh Bond in 1921
- Born: 30 June 1864; Marlborough, Wiltshire, England
- Died: 8 March 1945 (aged 80); Dolgellau, Merionethshire, Wales
- Occupations: Architect and psychical researcher
- Employer(s): Church of England, American Society for Psychical Research

Frederick Bligh Bond (30 June 1864 – 8 March 1945), was an English architect, illustrator, archaeologist, psychical researcher and member of the Societas Rosicruciana in Anglia.

== Early life ==
Bligh Bond was the son of the Rev. Frederick Hookey Bond. He was born in the Wiltshire town of Marlborough. His family was related to William Bligh, through his nephew Francis Godolphin Bond, Bligh Bond's grandfather. He was also a cousin of Sabine Baring-Gould. He was educated at home by his father, who was headmaster of the Marlborough Royal Free Grammar School. His brother, Francis George Bond, became a major general in the British Army.

== Architectural practice ==
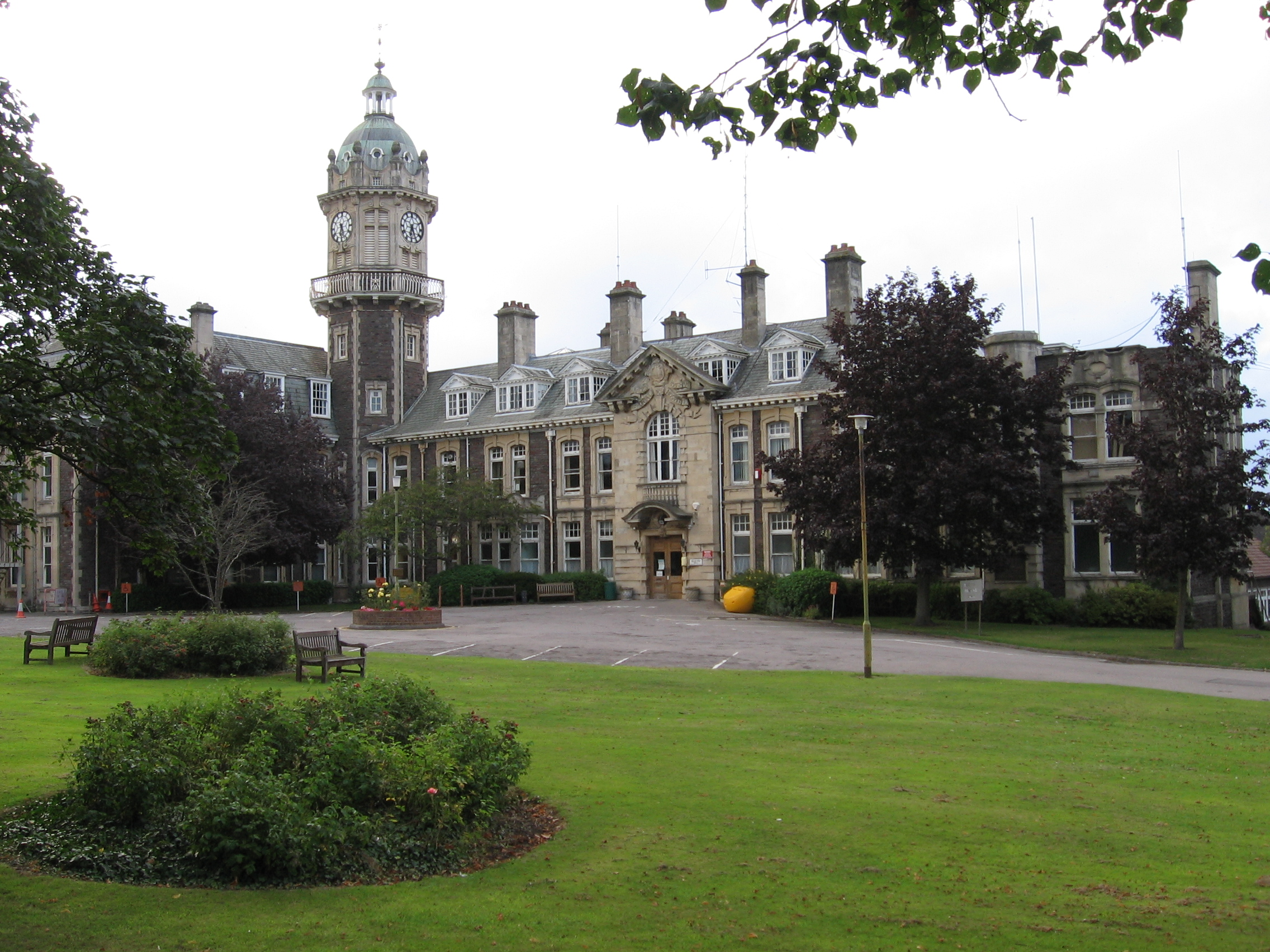
Bligh Bond's Cossham Memorial Hospital

He practised as an architect in Bristol from 1888. His work includes schools, such as the board schools in Barton Hill, Easton, and Southville, Greenbank Elementary School and St George's School. He designed the schools of medicine and engineering at Bristol University and the Music School of Clifton College. He also undertook a number of domestic commissions for the King's Weston estate of Philip Napier Miles, including a number of substantial houses in Shirehampton, the Miles Arms public house in Avonmouth, the now-demolished King's Weston estate office and the public hall in Shirehampton. Cossham Memorial Hospital is also an example of his work. The style of his mature works in the Edwardian years might be described as English Baroque or Queen Anne Revival. In addition he oversaw the restoration of a number of churches, became an acknowledged authority on the history of church architecture, and in 1909 published, with Dom Bede Camm, a two-volume treatise entitled Roodscreens and Roodlofts.

== Glastonbury excavations ==
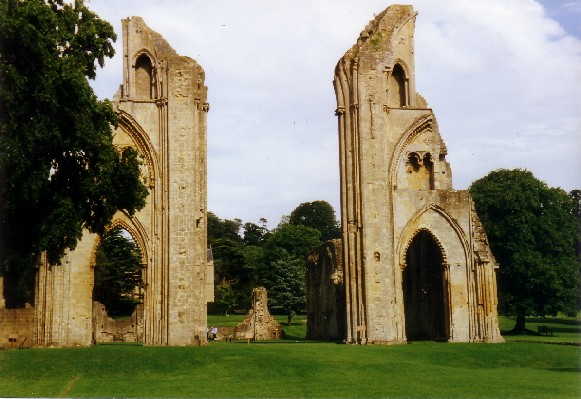
Glastonbury Abbey

As early as 1899 Bligh Bond had expressed his belief that the dimensions of the buildings at Glastonbury Abbey were based on gematria, and in 1917 he published, with Thomas Simcox Lea, Gematria, A Preliminary Investigation of the Cabala contained in the Coptic Gnostic Books and of a similar Gematria in the Greek text of the New Testament, which incorporated his own previously published paper, The Geometric Cubit as a Basis of Proportion in the Plans of Mediaeval Buildings.

In 1908 the Church of England appointed him director of excavations at Glastonbury Abbey. Before he was dismissed by Bishop Armitage Robinson in 1921, his excavations rediscovered the nature and dimensions of a number of buildings that had occupied the site. Bond's work at Glastonbury Abbey is one of the first documented examples of psychic archaeology. Bond with the retired navy Captain John Allan Bartlett ("John Alleyne") as a medium claimed to have contacted through automatic writing dead monks and the builder of the Edgar Chapel at Glastonbury, who advised him where to excavate.

In 1919 he published The Gate of Remembrance, which revealed that he had employed psychical methods to guide his excavation of the Glastonbury ruins. As a consequence of these revelations his relations with his employers, who strongly disapproved of spiritualism, deteriorated and he was sacked in 1921.

Archaeologists and skeptics have found Bond's claims dubious. Joseph McCabe suggested that Alleyne and Bond had "steeped themselves, all through the year 1907, in the literature of the subject. They read all that was known about Glastonbury, and lived for months in the medieval atmosphere."

In 1922 Rev. H. J. Wilkins published a detailed criticism of Bond's psychical claims. Wilkins concluded "there is absolutely nothing supermundane in the whole of the script... All that is true in the script could be gathered from historical data or reasonably conjectured by intelligent observation of existing facts and conditions."

Archaeologist Kenneth Feder commented that the "tall church towers, whose existence and locations we are to believe were provided by spirits, actually were recorded and located in a historical document Bond almost surely had already seen. Beyond this, an early drawing of the abbey, and even structural remains visible on the surface, provided clues as to the location of these towers."

Feder also noted that "there was no scientific controls whatsoever" and that it is impossible to tell whether he was actually advised by spirits or whether his expertise in church architecture and information from early drawings helped him locate the chapels he discovered.

In a series of articles published in The Skeptic, Chris French discusses in depth the possibility Bond's automatic writing may have instead been the result of the ideomotor effect and facilitated communication which was influenced by Alleyne. French also outlines a study which indicates Bond and Alleyne may have already been aware of the information they communicated in the writings but did not realise it at the time.

== Psychical research ==
Bligh joined the Freemasons in 1889, the Theosophical Society in 1895, the Society for Psychical Research in 1902, the Societas Rosicruciana in Anglia in 1909 and the Ghost Club in 1925.

From 1921 to 1926 he was editor of Psychic Science (then named Quarterly Transactions of the British College of Psychic Science).

In 1926 he emigrated to the US, where he was employed as education secretary of the American Society for Psychical Research (ASPR) and worked as editor on their magazine, Survival. Bligh Bond broke with the ASPR and returned to Britain in 1936, also rejoining the Ghost Club in the process, after supporting accusations against the medium Mina Crandon that she had fraudulently produced thumbprints on wax that she presented as being produced by the spirit of her dead brother, Walter.

During his time in the USA Bond was ordained, and in 1933 consecrated as a bishop, in the Old Catholic Church of America.

== Later life ==
He returned to the United Kingdom in 1935, spending his time in London and Dolgellau, Merionethshire, where he died of a heart attack.

== Legacy ==
Bond is mentioned as part of the background to Deborah Crombie's mystery novel A Finer End (Bantam, 2001). ISBN 0-553-57927-4

On 30 December 2008 Bligh Bond was the subject of a Channel 4 documentary, The Ghosts of Glastonbury, hosted by Tony Robinson, which examined Bligh Bond's claims that he received archaeological information through automatic writing from deceased monks.

== Publications ==
- Coates, Richard (2015) Frederick Bligh Bond (1864–1945): A Bibliography of his writings and a list of his buildings

Authored by Bligh Bond

- An Architectural Handbook to Glastonbury Abbey (1909)
- Roodscreens and Roodlofts, (journal article, 1909)
- The Gate of Remembrance (1918)
- The Hill of Vision (Boston: Marshall Jones Co., 1918)
- The Company of Avalon, a study of the script of Brother Symon, sub-prior of Winchester abbey in the time of King Stephen (1924)
- "The Gospel of Philip the Deacon: NO US ACCESS". The Online Books Page. 1932.
- The Secret of Immortality (1934)

Co-authored by Bligh Bond

- Bligh Bond, F. & Camm, Rev. Dom Bede. Rood screens and rood lofts – 2 vols. Vol. I • Vol. II (London, 1909)
- Bligh Bond, F. & Lea, Thomas Simcox. Gematria: A Preliminary Investigation Of The Cabala Contained In The Coptic Gnostic Books (1917)
- Bligh Bond, F. & Lea, Thomas Simcox. Materials for the Study of the Apostolic Gnosis, Part I (1919)
- Mantle, George E. Glastonbury Abbey: Recent discoveries (G. E Mantle, n.d, c.1926)

Illustrated by Bligh Bond

- Baring-Gould, S. An Old English Home and its Dependencies (Methuen & Co, 1898).
