= Dave Szulborski =

Independent alternate reality game developer

Dave Szulborski (June 23, 1957 – April 23, 2009) was the first professional independent alternate reality game developer, and an authority on ARGs. His books on the subject are used today in curricula on alternate reality games and transmedia storytelling. His independent games included ChangeAgents, Chasing the Wish, and Urban Hunt. He holds the Guinness World Record for Most Prolific ARG developer.

== Biography ==
Szulborski started his transmedia career as a beta tester for Majestic, an early attempt at pervasive gaming from Electronic Arts. He spun off his first games, called ChangeAgents, in that universe. One of the first independent ARG developers, Szulborski became well known for his work on indie games Chasing the Wish and Urban Hunt. He wrote This Is Not a Game, the first book on alternate reality games, and launched a career into professional ARG design with his contributions to Art of the Heist.

Later in his career, he created ARGs, puzzles, and stories for projects as varied as marketing campaigns and military training exercises. He was also a public speaker and contributing author on the topic of interactive storytelling.

Szulborski died in April 2009 of leukemia. Before his death, his battle with the illness prompted friends and fans of his work to create Folding the Wish, a project to send him a thousand origami cranes.

Dave has a son, Tyler David Szulboski.

In 2012, Szulborski was posthumously awarded the Guinness World Record for Most Prolific ARG Developer.

== Bibliography ==
=== Alternate reality games ===
- 2001: Majestic – beta tester, content creator through BIOS program – Electronic Arts
- 2001: ChangeAgents – Creative Chip - independent
- 2001: ChangeAgents – Operation Mindset - independent, done as part of Majestic's BIOS Program and featured on their website and in their newsletter
- 2002: ChangeAgents – Out of Control - independent
- 2003: Chasing the Wish – independent
- 2004: Urban Hunt (Dread House) - independent
- 2005: ARGTalk - independent
- 2005: Art of the Heist – for Audi, McKinney-Silver, Chelsea Digital, GMD Studios
- 2006: Who is Benjamin Stove? – for General Motors, Campbell-Ewald, GMD Studios
- 2006: Catching the Wish – independent
- 2007: Unnatural Selection (Monster Hunter Club) – for The Host movie, ARGStudios, Magnolia Pictures
- 2007: Helical Training program - an ARG based training program for BBN Technologies and the U.S. military (DARPA and JFCOM)
- 2008: Holomove – for Microsoft Visual Studio
- 2008: McCann Erickson, @radicalmedia

=== Books ===
- 2005: Author, This Is Not a Game: A Guide to Alternate Reality Gaming (ISBN 1411625951)
- 2006: Author, Through the Rabbit Hole: A Beginner’s Guide to Playing Alternate Reality Games (ISBN 978-1-4116-4828-9)
- 2006: Creator, Chasing The Wish (comic) (OCLC 123130948)
- 2007: Contributor, Space, Time, Play (ISBN 376438414X)
- 2008: Contributor, Digital Storytelling: A Creator's Guide to Interactive Entertainment, Volume 2 (ISBN 0240805100) and Branding Only Works on Cattle (ISBN 0446178020)

=== Television work ===
- 2006: Danger Game TV Show pilot with Superfine Films (NYC)

=== Non-ARG marketing campaigns and online games ===
- 2006: Hedgegames – for HP and DreamWorks for Over the Hedge film – Campfire Media
- 2006: Santa Barbara International Film Festival Podcasting official website design
- 2006: The Missing Gnome interactive components for Travelocity – McKinney-Silver
- 2007: Fairy Tale Ransom – M&M’S and DreamWorks for Shrek the Third – G2 Interactive
- 2007: Rise of the Chevy Autobots – Chevrolet, DreamWorks, and Paramount for the 2007 Transformers movie - Campbell-Ewald
- 2007: The President's Book Blog – Disney for the 2007 film National Treasure 2: Book of Secrets
- 2008: Starburst Brand And Skittles Brand "Summer Fever Search Party" – for G2 Interactive and Skittles
- 2008: Vroengard Academy – Random House and Deep Focus for the 2008 book release Brisingr
- 2008: Red Seal puzzle – HBO and Campfire for the HBO TV series True Blood
- 2008: No Known Survivors – Electronic Arts and Deep Focus for the 2008 video game Dead Space

== Citations ==
Graft, Kris (2009-04-28). "Obituary: Alternate Reality Designer Dave Szulborski". Gamasutra.

Waite, Jonathan (2009-04-25). "Announcement - Dave Szulborski". ARG Netcasts. Archived from the original on 2009-07-31.

Waite, Jonathan (2009-04-23). "Remembering Dave Szulborski". ARGNet: Alternate Reality Gaming Network.

Whalen, Zach (2006-11-20). "Review of This Is Not a Game by Dave Szulborski". Gameology. Archived from the original on 2011-07-21.

"BBN develops emergency training 'game' for U.S. military". Mass High Tech. 2008-02-04. Archived from the original on 2011-10-03.

Bray, Hiawatha (2005-04-25). "Through a hole, and into hidden worlds of fun". The Boston Globe.
