= Noreen Renier =

American self-proclaimed psychic detective (born 1937)

- Born: Noreen Jean Uzdavinis; January 16, 1937 (age 89); Montague, Massachusetts
- Occupation: Psychic detective
- Known for: Mediumship, psychic prediction
- Website: www.noreenrenier.com

Noreen Renier (born Noreen Jean Uzdavinis on January 16, 1937) is an American self‑proclaimed psychic detective whose widely publicized claims of helping police solve crimes have been disputed by investigators, journalists, and skeptical researchers. She is known for her work in mediumship, psychometry, and missing‑persons cases. Since the late 1970s she has appeared frequently in newspapers and television programs, promoting her claimed ability to assist law enforcement. Renier’s career has also been marked by significant controversy, including disputed case outcomes, legal issues, and by criticism from skeptics as well as the law enforcement community.

== Early life ==
Noreen Jean Uzdavinis was born to Lithuanian-descended parents Stephen Uzdavinis and Florida Uzdavinis (née Bourbeau), both born in Massachusetts. Her father worked in 1940 as a timekeeper and a tool grinder in an aircraft factory in 1950. He died in 1992. According to her 2005 obituary, Florida Uzdavinis was an "internationally renowned artist" and "lived all over the world", eventually settling in Orlando, Florida. Noreen was the middle child with an older sister, Patricia, who died in 2017, and a younger brother, Peter, who died in 2009.

In 1956, Renier worked as an actress in Southern California. She was in Tea and Sympathy at The Chapel in Redondo Beach, California and played Poppy Matson in The Tender Trap at the Camino Real Playhouse.

== Career ==
In 1977, Renier (sometimes using the name Noreen Uzdavinis) was working as a psychic medium. The Orlando Sentinel reporter Dean Johnson interviewed Renier at an Orlando hotel nightclub, learning that Renier charged $5 per reading and needed to hold an object that was worn close to the body. She was doing some work out of her home, but usually could be found in the lounge 6 to 8 hours, four days a week. Renier said that she receives many requests from businessmen asking to learn about financial futures. Living or dead readings are "all the same to her as far as messages, 'The dead give me more messages.'"

Renier advertises that she gives psychometry readings. In preparation for a 1978 paranormal test at the Psychical Research Foundation, Renier was described as "an extra sensory perception sensitive".

In 1979, Renier described herself to anthropologist David E. Jones as a "total skeptic about psychic phenomenon [sic]" up until 1976, when she met an Indian woman who taught her meditation. In sessions, she one day felt a "surge of energy vibrating though me. My stomach hurt terribly and I cried from the pain. The next moment a voice that sounded somewhat like mine came out of my mouth and said things I had no control over. I could see pictures and images while the words flowed. This experience repeated itself. ... I'm not a Spiritualist and do not belong to any group or organization. My studying and development has been by myself. I hope working in clinically supervised conditions will help me grow and understand more of psychic phenomena."

After the discovery of Jaycee Dugard in 2009, who had been kidnapped in 1991, investigator Ben Radford challenged Renier (and others) to "take a break from their TV appearances and lucrative lecture circuits to actually help find ...missing persons." He renewed this challenge in 2012 and again in 2013 after the discovery that Amanda Berry had escaped from her abductor in Cleveland without the help of psychics.

Renier claims to be the only psychic detective that has lectured at the FBI Academy, and claims she has worked on hundreds of "unsolved homicides, missing persons, and rape cases". According to Gary P. Posner's chapter about Renier in the 1994 book Psychic Sleuths, FBI Supervisory Special Agent and instructor Robert Ressler had been impressed by Renier's abilities when he attended her talks. As Ressler was by now retired, Posner interviewed fellow Supervisory Special Agent and instructor Richard Ault about Renier's 1981 Academy lecture in which she predicted President Ronald Reagan's attempted assassination. Ault told Posner that "I've questioned Bob about it on several occasions, and it sounded like the same stuff I've heard before. ... The way he described her prediction sounded to me rather bland. ... When I asked him exactly what all did she say, he wasn't real clear to me on it. He came up with some things that sounded pretty general." Ault added, "In retrospect, Ressler has often expressed [to me] regrets at having brought Renier to lecture. She's just caused him a lot of [paperwork] problems over the years [regarding] the kinds of claims that she's made." After Ressler's retirement, he continued to endorse, or according to Posner "embellish," Renier's prediction of the Reagan shooting—down to the exact date according to a 1993 Key West, FL, newspaper article. Yet though apparently forewarned about the attempt, Ressler did not inform the U.S. Secret Service. During Ressler's deposition in a 1986 court case, he testified that Renier had never been a paid FBI employee, been on a retainer, or "used in any regular capacity". He added that Renier had claimed in a promotional brochure that "she was an instructor for the FBI, something along that line, and I told her she could not say that".

During a 1988 interview on Gary Collins' Hour Magazine TV show, Renier showed Collins "a collection of what she described as police evidence from 'current cases'". Per Posner's Psychic Sleuths chapter, an additional guest on the program, Eugenie Scott, "mentioned to Collins that Renier's parading of such items across the country would be a gross violation of police procedure since, once allowed out of their custody, such 'evidence' would no longer be admissible in court." Collins then asked Renier if law enforcement really allowed her to "let that evidence go around the country". Her reply was "Uh, no, I don't think so, really. I, I, I, I, they don't know I have it here. And I haven't worked on it either", to which Collins responded, "... and that's why there are skeptics." Also during the show, Renier clarified that she had "not solved 123 cases ... I've just worked on 123 cases."

== Legal issues ==
In 1986, Renier filed a libel suit against skeptic John Merrell after he alleged Renier had acted fraudulently. The previous year, Merrell had sent a letter-to-the-editor to the Ashland Daily Tidings alleging "evidence of fraudulent claims [by Renier] involving police agencies, questionable background credentials, and current ongoing investigations by representatives of the National Council Against Health Fraud," or NCAHF. This letter was never published but was leaked to Renier by someone who worked for the newspaper. Renier sued for libel, asking for $275,000. According to Gary Posner's Psychic Sleuths chapter, the jury trial took three days and Renier was awarded $25,000. Over the next few years Renier and Merrell were engaged in legal proceedings, including Merrell filing for bankruptcy in an attempt to discharge the debt (having first guaranteed payment to his other creditors). This legal entanglement began in May 1985 when Merrell received a handwritten letter from a woman named Nancy Uzdavinis, who said she was considering attending an upcoming Renier workshop but first wanted to know if Renier really had psychic powers. Merrell began digging deep into Renier's activities and kept Uzdavinis abreast of his unfavorable findings. It was several years later, during a break in the 1989 bankruptcy trial, that the mention of Noreen Renier in the handwritten Uzdavinis letter was noted to match Renier's actual signature, as confirmed by a forensic handwriting expert—it appeared that Renier had used her sister-in-law's name to entrap Merrell into libeling her, though Renier and the real Nancy Uzdavinis provided sworn affidavits claiming that they did not "trick" or "entrap" him.

Ultimately, the judge ruled that there had been no "perjury, fraud, misrepresentation or any other misconduct" by Renier during the course of the bankruptcy proceedings and Merrell was compelled to pay the debt. The original libel trial was not addressed. According to Loyd Auerbach writing in Fate magazine, the jury felt Merrell "went further than merely claiming that there was no evidence for Noreen's abilities. The jury believed that he composed several statements that were ... fraudulent ... [and] defamatory ... [and] caused problems for her with her personal life and professional standing." The court found that his original claim regarding the NCAHF investigating Renier was not true, and he knew it wasn't true when he made it. Merrell made up a quote that had not been factual and he stated that Renier was claiming to have worked with specific State Police agencies, but Judge Stair, who oversaw the bankruptcy hearings, said Renier had never made that claim, and Merrell had not reached out to those specific agencies.

In June 1990, Merrell countersued Renier, alleging "malicious misconduct" by her and demanding "the names of the police agencies that had provided the various pieces of alleged 'evidence' that she had used during her televised 'psychometry' performances." Renier countersued with similar misconduct charges and the judge allowed extensions for her to gather the evidence demanded by Merrell, during which time "her multiple liens on Merrell's home threatened his ability to accept a job promotion and transfer". By March 1992, "Merrell decided to make his legal 'peace' with Renier" and the terms were sealed by the court.

In 2005, Renier's memoir, A Mind for Murder, co-authored by Naomi Lucks, was published in paperback by Berkley/Penguin but withdrawn from the market within months under threat of legal action by Merrell due to two chapters in which Renier publicly disparaged him, in violation of their 1992 agreement. An "Expanded, Revised, and Updated" edition, in larger, trade-paperback format, was issued in 2008 by Hampton Roads Publishing, absent acknowledgment of Lucks' co-authorship as well as the two offending chapters, which were replaced with two new ones. On the cover of the newer edition, where "with Naomi Lucks" had appeared nearly as large as Renier's name on the original, are the words, "Court TV's Psychic Detective."

In November 2006 a "federal judge granted summary judgment against" Renier, who was one of Psychic Detectives's "feature attractions". The judgment found that "her claims of helping solve a missing-persons case were completely false."

== Katie Worsky case ==
Katie Worsky, then twelve years old, went missing from a sleepover in July 1982. Renier volunteered her services to help find Worsky, stating that she found it difficult since she didn't have anything she could touch physically. The psychic said Worsky would be found "in a 'low, cement or cinderblock structure' with a 'wood roof ... low to the earth'". Sheriff George Bailey said he checked out "'60 or 70 low cement buildings. I have 750 square miles of Albemarle County to cover. She, (Renier), should be able to tell me where she (Worsky) is'". Police Chief Bowen "issued an appeal for area residents to search their own wooded or rural property for the body" ... the search "has covered hundreds of acres 'on a piecemeal basis'". Blood stained items were found in the home where she disappeared from and in the apartment of Glenn H. Barker. She had been provided beer by Barker who was the last known adult to see her. In 2014 Worsky had still not been found, however, Glenn Barker was "convicted of second degree murder" serving "nine years in prison and was released in 1992".

== Deborah Whitlock case ==
In 1988, 32-year-old Deborah Whitlock was found dead with her throat slashed and her body sexually assaulted. Whitlock's mother, Jacque McDonald, paid $450 to Renier to come up with leads for the police. During two interviews with Detective Ray Taylor of the Modesto Police Department, the media reported that Renier "provided numerous details of the crime and a description of a suspect." In 1997, after DNA found at the crime scene matched earlier crimes, Scott Avery Fizzell confessed, was tried for the murder, and was sentenced to 31 years.

== Leo Beauregard case ==
On June 29, 1990, Leo Beauregard was found stabbed at his kitchen table in North Palm Beach, Florida. In 1992, on the TV show 48 Hours, Renier appeared in the episode titled "Psychic Detectives". She held a beer can and bloody towel without gloves and described the assailant to a police sketch artist as having "Hooded eyes … thin mouth … some sharpness in the nose … oval jaw". That description did not lead to a name of a suspect. In 2020, police investigators tested the beer can for DNA and in August 2021 the DNA led them to violent felon Mark Steven Gribbin, who was found to have had a personal relationship with Beauregard, despite Gribbin denying any relationship with him. In Gribbin's 2021 trial, the defense argued that the chain of custody had been broken, showing the 1992 video of Renier holding the beer can with her bare hands. The jury found Gribbin guilty of murder and he was sentenced to life in prison. When the media contacted Renier in 2021, she stated, "This is so unbelievable after 30 years almost."

== William E. Ritter Sr. case ==
In November 1991, an Ashland, Ohio, home was burglarized and 82-year-old William E. Ritter Sr. was found murdered in his basement. Initially, Ritter's stepson, Robert Kiefer, recommended a Texas psychic he had seen on Unsolved Mysteries, whom the police worked with until Ritter's widow recommended Renier. The police switched to working with her, with Kiefer paying Renier for her help. In 1993, the family doubled the award money to $15,000 in the hopes that someone would come forward with information. As of 2026, the murderer of Ritter has not been found.

== New York Zodiac killer case ==
On a 1990 Joan Rivers Show discussing the New York Zodiac killer, Renier was handed photocopies of two letters that were sent to authorities by the killer. Within seconds, Renier began speaking "in the first person, as if she had become 'Zodiac,' saying such things as 'My beard is now shaved' ... 'I don't know if they called me 'stupido' or what when I was younger," and "I'm killing because these men are worthless anyway". Switching back to herself, Renier said that there will be two more killings. Rivers asked Renier where Zodiac lived and Renier "began gesticulating in all directions" describing such things as a "very dark brick building", a traffic light, a bridge, apartments with staircases. She then stated that he lives with a younger man. In his Psychic Sleuths chapter about Renier, Posner writes that she was unable to give any specifics that would track the killer, and when speaking as Zodiac she was even unable to discern his name. Rivers asked if Renier would give this information to the police after the show, to which Renier replied that there is a "possibility." On the following day's show, Rivers announced that Renier was now working with the New York Police Department on the Zodiac case. But when Posner called and spoke to NYPD Information Officer St. Just, he was told that perhaps Renier had offered information as might any other citizen, but that she was "not working with the police department. ... We didn't reach out [for her]."

== Baby Katie Gray case ==
Renier was paid $1,000 by a private citizen to locate the body of 10-month-old Katie Gray, who went missing on November 29, 2004. Parents Johnnie and Sandy Gray had been trying to cross a flooded creek in Kentucky when their vehicle stalled. The parents stated that when removing Katie and her car seat, Johnnie's hand slipped and the infant disappeared in the water. The parents pled guilty of leaving the scene, reckless homicide, possession of marijuana and failing to report the disappearance for several hours, and were sentenced to five years in prison. As of 2026, the body of Katie Gray has not been found.

== Personal life ==
Noreen Uzdavinis married Donald Klincko in 1957 and had two daughters, Karla and Reneé. The couple divorced in 1967. In 1972, Noreen Klincko married David Renier, divorcing in 1974, and retained the last name Renier for her career as a psychic detective, though occasionally she used Noreen Uzdavinis. Daughter Reneé Klincko died in 2017. In 2014, Renier revealed that she had been a smoker for many years and had surgery for lung cancer.

== Works and publications ==
- Renier, Noreen. (May 9, 2008). A Mind for Murder: The Real-Life Files of a Psychic Investigator. Hampton Roads Publishing. ISBN 978-1571745736.
- Renier, Noreen. (January 1, 2011). The Practical Psychic: A No-Nonsense Guide to Developing Your Natural Intuitive Abilities. Adams Media Corp. ISBN 978-1440506239.
