= Fraser River (Newfoundland and Labrador) =

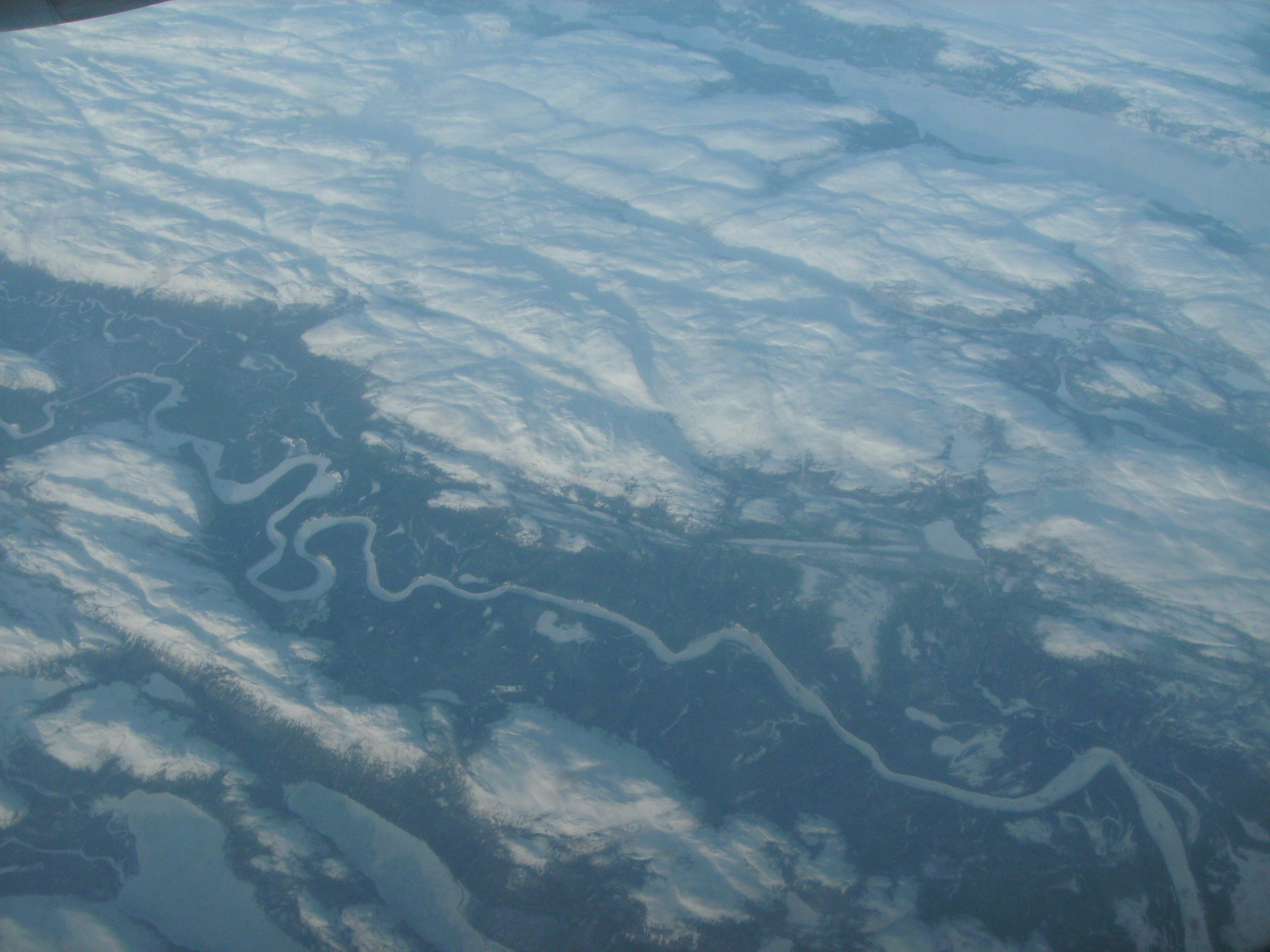

Location
- Country: Canada

Physical characteristics
- Source
  - location: Labrador, Newfoundland and Labrador
  - coordinates: 56°44′34.34″N 63°52′2″W
  - elevation: 297 m (974 ft)
- Mouth
  - location: Nain Bay, Labrador, Newfoundland and Labrador
  - coordinates: 56°37′13.27″N 62°15′12″W
  - elevation: 0 m (0 ft)
- Length: 105 km (65 mi)

The Fraser River in northern Labrador flows west to east in geological trench. The gorge is narrow and deep. The upper watershed drains to Tasisuak Lake. Eastward the rift widens to shallow, brackish ponds where flow reverses with the flush of tide. Salt marshes border the mouth and vast sandy delta littered with boulders stretches to Nain Bay (about 35 km (22 mi) west of Nain).

In 1910, British explorer Hesketh Prichard ascended the river, continuing through Bear Ravine (56°41′50.78″N 63°30′27.58″W) to access Indian House Lake on George River.

Lower reaches of Labrador's Fraser River

== See also ==
- List of rivers of Newfoundland and Labrador
