= Superfine Films =

Superfine Films is a Manhattan-based film & television production company.

Superfine produces content for major cable networks, including A&E, Lifetime, Discovery, Destination America, Animal Planet, TruTV, Scripps Networks, and others. Some of its shows are Hillbilly Blood on Destination America, Turn & Burn on Discovery, Chasing Nashville on Lifetime, Building Off The Grid for DIY, Rock & Roll Acid Test for Fuse, and Psychic Detectives for Tru TV.
