= Stefan Ossowiecki =

Polish engineer, psychic (1877-1944)

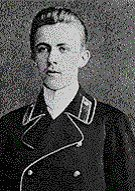
Young Stefan Ossowiecki, in Russia

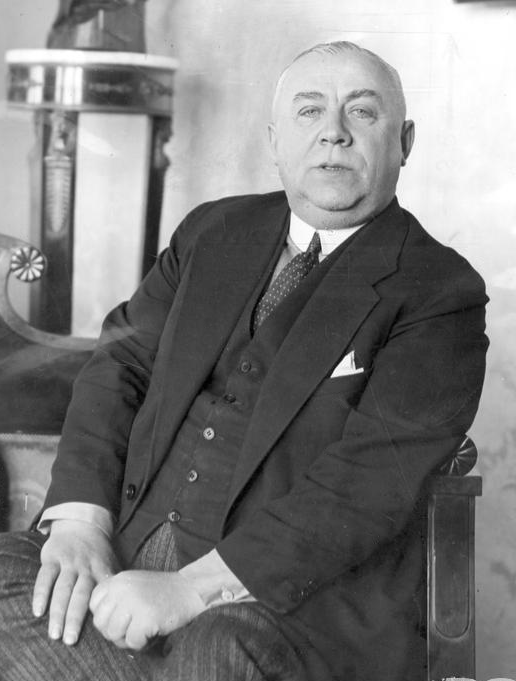
Ossowiecki at home, 1932

Stefan Ossowiecki (Moscow, 22 or 26 August 1877 – Warsaw, 5 August 1944) was a Russian and Polish engineer who was, during his lifetime, promoted as one of Europe's best-known psychics. Two notable persons who credited his claims were pioneering French parapsychologist Gustav Geley and Nobel Prize-winning physiologist Charles Richet, who called Ossowiecki "the most positive of psychics."

== Life ==
Ossowiecki was born in Moscow in 1877 into an affluent family of former Polish aristocrats. His Moscow-born father, owner of a large chemicals factory and assistant to Dmitri Mendeleyev, clung to his Polish heritage and taught his son to speak Polish and to think of himself as a Pole.

Stefan Ossowiecki was said to have manifested psychic talents in his youth, much to his family's confusion. When young Stefan told his mother he could see bands of color around people, she took him to an eye doctor, who prescribed drops to cure the condition. The medicine "irritated my eyes but did not diminish my ability," Ossowiecki later recounted.

As a young man, Ossowiecki was enrolled at the prestigious Saint Petersburg Polytechnical University, where he was trained in his father's profession of chemical engineering. It was during this period that young Ossowiecki allegedly demonstrated an ability to perform psychokinesis.

After earning his degree, Ossowiecki returned to Moscow, where he lived the life of a sybarite and joined the circle of Czar Nicholas II and the Russian court.

In 1915 his father died, and Ossowiecki inherited the family chemicals business, making him temporarily a wealthy man. Only three years later, he lost it all as the Bolshevik Revolution swept the country. As a wealthy capitalist and friend of the czar, Ossowiecki was targeted by the new regime. His property was seized, and he was imprisoned. The isolation of a prison cell forced Ossowiecki to "think through many things ... It was then that I began to fully value this gift given me by the Creator, and I understood that by utilization of it I could help others." He was sentenced to be executed, but after half a year he was released due to support of a friend from his youth, now a Bolshevik party official.

He was released in 1919 and fled Russia, penniless at age 42. Ossowiecki entered business as a chemical engineer in Warsaw. He arranged for his consulting work to complement his work helping people in need.

He never had children. In 1939, Ossowiecki married a second time and completed a screenplay for Paramount Pictures about his life, The Eyes Which See Everything.

Ossowiecki told friends that when he died, his body would not be found. He was probably killed by the Gestapo during the Warsaw Uprising, on 5 August 1944, at the building of the former Polish Chief Inspectorate of the Armed Forces on Aleje Ujazdowskie (Ujazdów Avenue). His body was never found; he has a cenotaph at Warsaw's Powązki Cemetery.

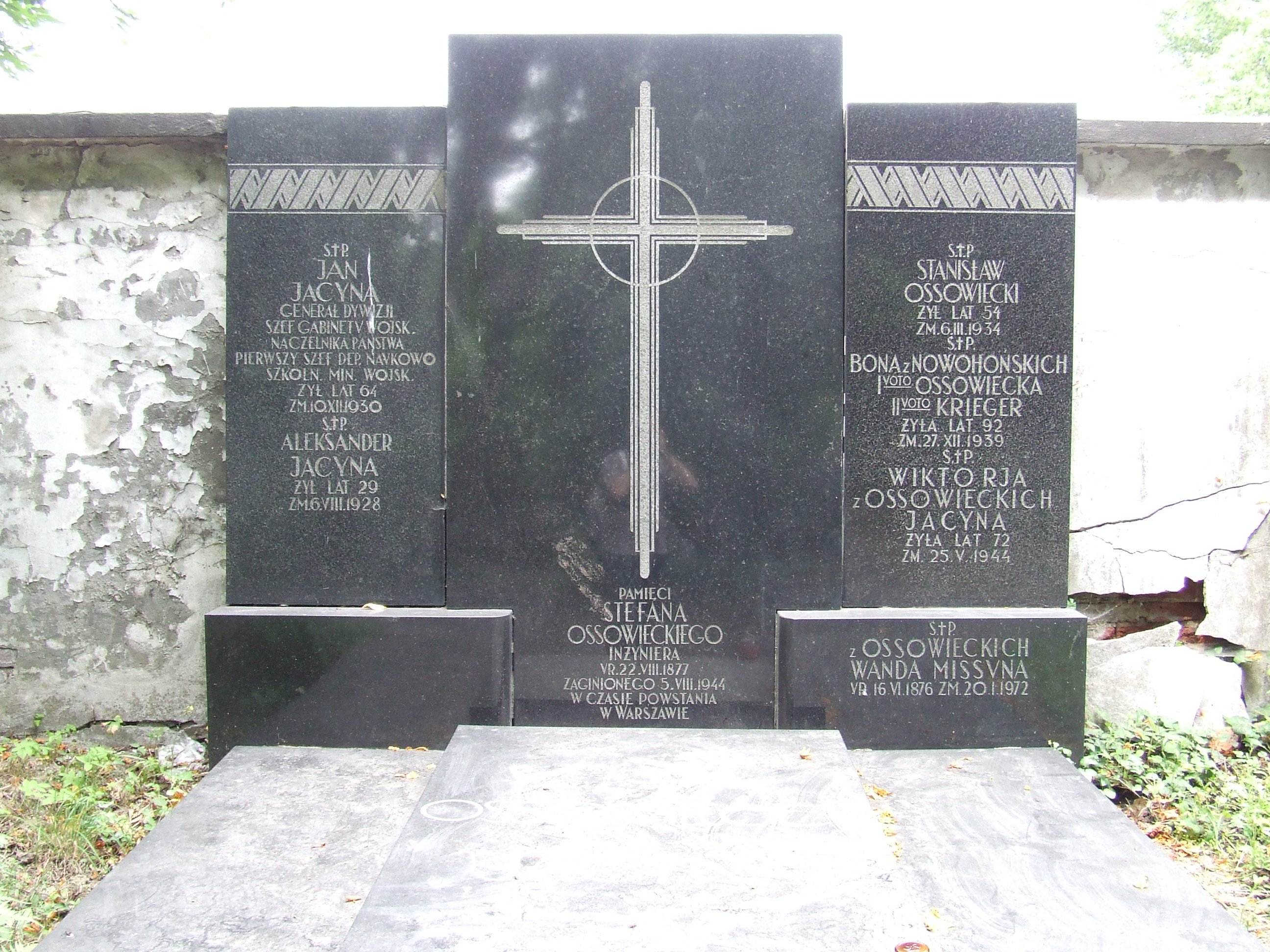
Ossowiecki's cenotaph, Warsaw

== Career ==
In the 1920s many experiments were performed in which Ossowiecki allegedly demonstrated clairvoyance (the ability to see objects in sealed containers) and astral projection (the ability to travel outside the body). Nobel laureate Charles Richet would write in his book Our Sixth Sense: "If any doubt concerning the sixth sense remains ... this doubt will be dissipated by the sum total of the experiments made by Geley, by myself, and by others with Stefan Ossowiecki."

In 1927-28, after the German armed forces began in 1926 using the Enigma cipher machine, the Polish General Staff's Cipher Bureau, in Warsaw, attempted to solve the machine with the help of leading mathematicians and by resort to parapsychology, but not even Stefan Ossowiecki could help.

== Critical reception ==
The ethnologist Stanislaw Poniatowski tested Ossowiecki's psychic abilities between 1937 and 1941, giving him Paleolithic stone artefacts. When Ossowiecki tried to describe the stone tools' makers, his descriptions resembled descriptions of Neanderthals, though the tools had been made by anatomically modern humans.

In May 1939 he predicted that there would be no war that year and that Poland would retain good relations with Italy—predictions that did not pan out: on September 1, 1939, the Germans invaded Poland, and World War II began.

The parapsychologist Rosalind Heywood described an experiment in which Ossowiecki had guessed the contents of a sealed envelope in 1933. However, C. E. M. Hansel claimed the conditions of the experiment were reminiscent of a simple conjuring trick. Psychologist E. F. O'Doherty wrote that the clairvoyance experiments with Ossowiecki were not scientific.

== See also ==
- Jan Guzyk
- List of Poles
