= Flaxman Low =

Fictional occult detective

Flaxman Low is a fictional character created by British authors Hesketh Hesketh-Prichard and his mother, Kate O'Brien Ryall Prichard, published under the pseudonyms "H. Heron" and "E. Heron". Low is credited with being one of the first occult detectives in fiction, and appears in a series of twelve short stories, first published from 1898 to 1899.

== Description ==
In the fictional stories, Flaxman Low is a pseudonym for "one of the leading scientists of the" Victorian era," whose real name is not disclosed. He is described as having been an accomplished athlete in his youth who turned his interests to a scientific study of the occult.

== Stories ==
From 1898 to 1899, press baron Cyril Arthur Pearson published six Flaxman Low stories in his monthly Pearson's Magazine, though the authors were disconcerted to find the tales promoted by Pearson as "real". The collected work was published as Ghosts: Being the Experiences of Flaxman Low in 1899.

The stories are as follows:

- "The Story of the Spaniards, Hammersmith" (1898)
- "The Story of Medhans Lea" (1898)
- "The Story of the Moor Road" (1898)
- "The Story of Baelbrow" (1898)
- "The Story of Yand Manor House" (1898)
- "The Story of the Grey House" (1899)
- "The Story of Saddler's Croft" (1899)
- "The Story of Sevens Hall" (1899)
- "The Story of No. 1 Karma Crescent" (1899)
- "The Story of Konnor Old House" (1899)
- "The Story of Crowsedge" (1899)
- "The Story of Mr Flaxman Low" (1899)

=== By other authors ===
The Improbable Adventures of Sherlock Holmes (2009) includes a short story by author Barbara Roden, "The Things That Shall Come Upon Them", which teams up Flaxman Low with Sherlock Holmes who together investigate a haunted house mystery.
