= Stephen Williams (archaeologist) =

Stephen Williams (August 28, 1926 – June 2, 2017) was an archaeologist at Harvard University who held the title of Peabody Professor of North American Archaeology and Ethnography.

== Fantastic Archaeology ==
Williams is best known as the author of Fantastic Archaeology (1991) and a course at Harvard based on the same material; a critical examination of pseudoarchaeological claims such as Atlantis, Mu, fringe related pre-Columbian trans-oceanic contact theories, psychic archaeology, etc. He also discusses claims made in the Book of Mormon about the prehistoric Americas. The book has received positive reviews.

Anthropologist Julia C. Lowell commented it "should be read by any archeologist concerned with educating the public about the past". The archaeologist Francis B. Harrold described it as an "important contribution and an "invaluable reference work for anyone interested in unconventional beliefs about the human past".

According to Kenneth Feder, "Williams's book is a valuable contribution to the regrettably short list of publications by professional archaeologists examining, responding to, and debunking extreme claims made in the name of the discipline."

== Notable students ==
- Tristram Randolph Kidder

== Publications ==
- An Archaeological Study of the Mississippian Culture in Southeast Missouri (1954) PhD dissertation, Department of Anthropology, Yale University, University Microfilms, Ann Arbor, Michigan.
- Fantastic Archaeology: The Wild Side of North American Prehistory (1991)
- Excavations at the Lake George Site, Yazoo Country, Mississippi, 1958–1960 (2004) Papers of the Peabody Museum of Archaeology and Ethnology.

== Sources ==
- Williams publication on lower Mississippi archeology
