= List of scams =

Scams and confidence tricks are difficult to classify, because they change often and often contain elements of more than one type. Throughout this list, the perpetrator of the confidence trick is called the "con artist" or simply "artist", and the intended victim is the "mark". This list should not be considered complete but covers the most common examples.

== Get-rich-quick schemes ==
Get-rich-quick schemes are extremely varied; these include fake franchises, real estate "sure things", get-rich-quick books, wealth-building seminars, self-help gurus, sure-fire inventions, useless products, chain letters, fortune tellers, quack doctors, miracle pharmaceuticals, foreign exchange fraud, Nigerian money scams, fraudulent treasure hunts, and charms and talismans. Variations include the pyramid scheme, the Ponzi scheme, and the matrix scheme.

=== The "Money-Box Scheme" ===
Victor Lustig, a con artist born in Austria-Hungary, designed and sold a "money box" which he claimed could print $100 bills using blank sheets of paper. A victim, sensing huge profits and untroubled by ethical implications, would buy the machine for a high price—from $25,000 to $102,000. Lustig stocked the machine with six to nine genuine $100 bills for demonstration purposes, but after that it produced only blank paper. By the time victims realized that they had been scammed, Lustig was long gone.

=== Salting ===
Salting or "salting the mine" are terms for a scam in which gemstones or gold ore are planted in a mine or on the landscape, duping the mark into purchasing shares in a worthless or non-existent mining company. During gold rushes, scammers would load shotguns with gold dust and shoot into the sides of the mine to give the appearance of a rich ore, thus "salting the mine". Examples include the diamond hoax of 1872 and the Bre-X gold fraud of the mid-1990s.

This trick was featured in the HBO series Deadwood, when Al Swearengen and E. B. Farnum trick Brom Garret into believing gold is to be found on the claim Swearengen intends to sell him. This con was also featured in Sneaky Pete. In season 3 of the TV series Leverage, the team salts a mine with coltan in order to run a con on two greedy and corrupt luminaries.

=== Spanish Prisoner ===
The Spanish Prisoner scam—and its modern variant, the advance-fee scam or "Nigerian letter scam"—involves enlisting the mark to aid in retrieving some stolen money from its hiding place. The victim sometimes believes they can cheat the con artists out of their money, but anyone trying this has already fallen for the essential con by believing that the money is there to steal (see also Black money scam). The classic Spanish Prisoner trick also contains an element of the romance scam (see below).

Many con artists employ extra tricks to keep the victim from going to the police. A common ploy of investment scammers is to encourage a mark to use money concealed from tax authorities. The mark cannot go to the authorities without revealing that they have committed tax fraud. Many swindles involve a minor element of crime or some other misdeed. The mark is made to think that they will gain money by helping fraudsters get huge sums out of a country (the classic advance-fee fraud/Nigerian scam); hence a mark cannot go to the police without revealing that they planned to commit a crime themselves.

In a twist on the Nigerian fraud scheme, the mark is told they are helping someone overseas collect debts from corporate clients. Large cheques stolen from businesses are mailed to the mark. These cheques are altered to reflect the mark's name, and the mark is then asked to cash them and transfer all but a percentage of the funds (their commission) to the con artist. The cheques are often completely genuine, except that the "pay to" information has been expertly changed. This exposes the mark not only to enormous debt when the bank reclaims the money from their account, but also to criminal charges for money laundering. A more modern variation is to use laser-printed counterfeit cheques with the proper bank account numbers and payer information.

This scam can be seen in the film The Spanish Prisoner.

== Persuasion tricks ==
Persuasion fraud, when fraudsters persuade people only to target their money, is an old-fashioned type of fraud.

=== Grandparent scam ===
A grandparent gets a call or e-mail from someone claiming to be their grandchild, saying that they are in trouble. For example, the scammer may claim to have been arrested and require money wired, or gift cards purchased for bail, and asks the victim not to tell the grandchild's parents, as they would "only get upset". The call is fraudulent impersonation, the name of the grandchild typically obtained from social media postings as well as obituaries listed either in newspapers or from a funeral home's website. Any money wired out of the country is gone forever.

=== Romance scam ===
The traditional romance scam has now moved into Internet dating sites, gaining a new name of catfishing. The con actively cultivates a romantic relationship which often involves promises of marriage. However, after some time, it becomes evident that this Internet "sweetheart" is stuck in their home country, lacking the money to leave and therefore unable to be united with the mark. The scam then becomes an advance-fee fraud or a check fraud. A wide variety of reasons can be offered for the trickster's lack of cash, but rather than just borrow the money from the victim (advance fee fraud), the con-artist normally declares that they have checks which the victim can cash on their behalf and remit the money via a non-reversible transfer service to help facilitate the trip (check fraud). Of course, the checks are forged or stolen and the con-artist never makes the trip: the hapless victim ends up with a large debt and an aching heart. This scam can be seen in the movie Nights of Cabiria. Variants of these employ bots or even live people who offer to go to live cam sites to video chat with the mark. The sites almost always require a credit card to be entered. The scammer insists the site is free and the card is only for purposes of age verification. The scammer will aggressively push using the site instead of a more well-known service like Skype, Zoom, WhatsApp, or using more rational ways to obtain age verification (such as asking to see a driver's license or passport). Typically these sites charge a relatively low fee, often close to US$25–$50. After the fee has been paid the scammer vanishes and the site ceases to exist shortly thereafter. This is common on quick dating sites like Tinder or free ones like OkCupid, but has been seen on ones that require payment as well.

In some cases, an online dating site is itself engaged in fraud, posting profiles of fictional persons or persons which the operator knows are not currently looking for a date in the advertised locality.

=== Fortune-telling fraud ===
One traditional swindle involves fortune-telling. In this scam, a fortune teller uses cold reading skills to detect that a client is genuinely troubled rather than merely seeking entertainment; or is a gambler complaining of bad luck. The fortune teller informs the mark that they are the victim of a curse, and that for a fee a spell can be cast to remove the curse. In Romany, this trick is called bujo ("bag") after one traditional format: the mark is told that the curse is in their money; they bring money in a bag to have the spell cast over it, and leaves with a bag of worthless paper. Fear of this scam has been one justification for legislation that makes fortune-telling a crime. See the "Blessing Scam" below.

This scam got a new lease on life in the electronic age with the virus hoax. Fake anti-virus software falsely claims that a computer is infected with viruses, and renders the machine inoperable with bogus warnings unless blackmail is paid. In the Datalink Computer Services incident, a mark was fleeced of several million dollars by a firm that claimed that his computer was infected with viruses, and that the infection indicated an elaborate conspiracy against him on the Internet. The alleged scam lasted from August 2004 through October 2010 and is estimated to have cost the victim $6–20 million.

== Gold brick scams ==
Gold brick scams involve selling a tangible item for more than it is worth; they are named for the scam of selling the victim an allegedly golden ingot which turns out to be gold-coated lead.

=== Fiddle game ===
The fiddle game uses the pigeon drop technique. A pair of con men work together, one going into an expensive restaurant in shabby clothes, eating, and claiming to have left his wallet at home, which is nearby. As collateral, the con man leaves his only worldly possession, the violin that provides his livelihood. After he leaves, the second con man swoops in, offers an outrageously large amount (for example $50,000) for what he calls a rare instrument, then looks at his watch and runs off to an appointment, leaving his card for the mark to call him when the fiddle-owner returns. The "poor man" comes back, having gotten the money to pay for his meal and redeem his violin. The mark, thinking he has an offer on the table from the second conspirator, then buys the violin from the fiddle player who "reluctantly" agrees to sell it for a certain amount that still allows the mark to make a "profit" from the valuable violin. The result is the two con men are richer (less the cost of the violin), and the mark is left with a cheap instrument.

The fiddle game may be played with any sufficiently valuable-seeming piece of property; a common variation known as the pedigreed-dog swindle uses a mongrel dog upsold as a rare breed but is otherwise identical.

=== Green goods ===
The green goods scam, also known as the "green goods game", was a scheme popular in the 19th-century United States in which people were duped into paying for worthless counterfeit money. It is a variation on the pig-in-a-poke scam using money instead of other goods like a pig. The mark would respond to flyers circulated throughout the country by the scammers ("green goods men") which claimed to offer "genuine" counterfeit currency for sale. This currency was sometimes alleged to have been printed with stolen engraving plates. Victims, usually living outside major cities, would be enticed to travel to the location of the green goods men to complete the transaction. Victims were guided by a "steerer" to be shown large amounts of genuine currency—represented to be counterfeit—which was then placed in a bag or satchel. Victims then received offers to purchase the money at a price much less than face value. While a victim negotiated a price or was otherwise distracted, another accomplice (the "ringer") would switch the bag of money for a bag containing sawdust, green paper, or other worthless items. Victims would leave unaware of the switch, and were unwilling to report the crime, as attempting to purchase counterfeit currency was itself a crime and the victim accordingly risked arrest.

=== Pig in a poke (cat in a bag) ===
Pig in a poke originated in the late Middle Ages. The con entails a sale of what is claimed to be a small pig, in a poke (bag). The bag actually contains a cat (not particularly prized as a source of meat). If one buys the bag without looking inside it, the person has bought something of less value than was assumed, and has learned first-hand the lesson caveat emptor. "Buying a pig in a poke" has become a colloquial expression in many European languages, including English, for when someone buys something without examining it beforehand. In some regions the "pig" in the phrase is replaced by "cat", referring to the bag's actual content, but the saying is otherwise identical. This is also said to be where the phrase "letting the cat out of the bag" comes from, although there may be other explanations.

In Portuguese or Spanish speaking countries, the "pig" in the phrase is replaced by a hare or jackrabbit. A victim thinks he is buying a hare, when in reality he is buying a cat, hence the expression "gato por lebre" (in Portuguese) or "gato por liebre" (in Spanish).

=== Thai gems ===
The Thai gem scam involves layers of con men and helpers who tell a tourist in Bangkok of an opportunity to earn money by buying duty-free jewelry and having it shipped back to the tourist's home country. The mark is driven around the city in a tuk-tuk operated by one of the con men, who ensures that the mark meets one helper after another, until the mark is persuaded to buy the jewelry from a store also operated by the swindlers. The gems are real but significantly overpriced. This scam has been operating for twenty years in Bangkok, and is said to be protected by Thai police and politicians. A similar scam usually runs in parallel for custom-made suits. Many tourists are hit by con men touting both goods.

A similar trick in Thailand involves lying about the presence of ivory in ornaments. Tricksters offer a non-ivory ornament for sale next to a sign in English reading "It is strictly forbidden to transport ivory into the United States, and the seller assumes no responsibility". This may make the buyer believe he or she has stumbled upon "forbidden fruit", tempting him to purchase the ornament, usually small and easy to hide, and smuggle it out of the country. The buyer would later discover that the ornament is made out of bone matter with no trace of ivory whatsoever.

=== Financial Condition Scam ===
In twists on the Gold-Brick Scam and the False Documents Scam, in the Financial Condition Scam the con artist convinces the mark through purported objective evidence that con artist is wealthier than he is. The 'gold brick' the scammer sells is himself.

The trick was common in Manhattan commercial banking and insurance circles between the 1980s and the 2020s. The con relies upon the truth that commercial lending and insurance, despite third-party appraisals and due diligence research, are based ultimately on trust between lender and borrower. The function of the scam is simple -- the grifters generate phony documents that show the applicant borrower meets or exceeds capital liquidity requirements needed to qualify for multi-million-dollar financing or insurance.

However, banks and insurance companies expect some documents in their business to be fraudulent. The difficult part of the scam is to do many other things over long years that imbue the con artist and the documents he generates with an aura of wealth around the frontman. In the case of the Trump Organization, the phony financial documents were provided first to independent auditors who themselves then generated third-party documents based on those false representations.

Meanwhile, much time and energy goes into "salting" the public sphere with purported soft evidence (in a version of the Salt the Mine scam) of wealth — including feeding phony information to financial journalists (even through phony press agents) in order to have the front-man ranked highly on lists of the nation's wealthiest people. The listing is then used to "prove" that the frontman is financially liquid enough. Other tactics include placing phony items with tabloid gossip columns that note the frontman's lavish lifestyle and profligate spending, and ensuring company "stores" where marks are fleeced have expensive-seeming "fits and finishes" (in reality, cheap carpet, tile, paint, countertops, lighting fixtures, etc.).

In the Trump case, evidence in a trial at equity held in the Manhattan New York State Supreme Court showed that the operation had reported that one of its chief "stores," a tri-plex residential unit in Trump Tower, while legitimately owned, was three times the square footage that it had in reality. The lie was key to the grift because that "proof point" was also part of pressure campaigns on financial journalists working on lists of the wealthiest people.

=== White-van speakers ===
In the white van speaker scam, low-quality loudspeakers are sold—stereotypically from a white van—as expensive units that have been greatly discounted. The salesmen explain the ultra-low price in a number of ways; for instance, that their employer is unaware of having ordered too many speakers, so they are sneakily selling the excess behind the boss's back. The "speakermen" are ready to be haggled down to a seemingly minuscule price, because the speakers they are selling, while usually functional, actually cost only a tiny fraction of their "list price" to manufacture. The scam may extend to the creation of Web sites for the bogus brand, which usually sounds similar to that of a respected loudspeaker company. They will often place an ad for the speakers in the "For sale" Classifieds of the local newspaper, at the exorbitant price, and then show the mark a copy of this ad to "verify" their worth.

A "trade show" variation of a similar scam might involve a scammer pretending to have car troubles on the side of a highway, trying to hail passing vehicles. When a good Samaritan pulls over, the person claims to be a foreign citizen visiting the country to participate in some local trade show. The person claims that they are about to leave the country after the show (e.g., are on their way to the airport), but their car has run out of fuel and they have no local currency to refill it or hire a taxi. At the same time they demonstrate that the trunk of their car is full of goods, which they claim have been taken from their just-dismantled company booth after the show. These goods are typically compact popular items like electronics or power tools. They offer these items to the mark at a "significantly reduced" price, allegedly just to raise some local cash in order to "get to the airport". (Sometimes the scammer tries to sell a valuable personal jewelry item, like a gold ring off his finger.) In most cases the items are technically genuine, but worth incomparably less than what the scammer attempts to sell them for. In a well-prepared version of this scam the scammer is often a true foreigner, speaking with genuine accent and possessing good mastery of their respective foreign language.

People shopping for bootleg software, illegal pornographic images, bootleg music, drugs, firearms or other forbidden or controlled goods may be legally hindered from reporting swindles to the police. An example is the "big screen TV in the back of the truck": the TV is touted as "hot" (stolen), so it will be sold for a very low price. The TV is in fact defective or broken; it may in fact not even be a television at all, since some scammers have discovered that a suitably decorated oven door will suffice. The buyer has no legal recourse without admitting to the attempted purchase of stolen goods.

=== Iraqi Dinar ===
Iraqi currency is sold to would-be investors with the belief that economic/financial circumstances will drastically increase the value of their investment. In fact there is no credible rationale or information to indicate that those circumstances will materialize or, if they do materialize, that they will have significant effect on the value of the currency. Moreover, the dealers sell currency to these investors at substantial mark-up such that a significant appreciation of the currency would be required just to make their investment break even.

== Extortion or false-injury tricks ==
=== Badger game ===
The badger game extortion was perpetrated largely upon married men. The mark is deliberately coerced into a compromising position, a supposed affair for example, then threatened with public exposure of his acts unless blackmail money is paid.

=== Bogus dry-cleaning bill scam ===
A mail fraud that is typically perpetrated on restaurateurs, this scheme takes a receipt from a legitimate dry cleaner in the target city, duplicates it thousands of times, and sends it to every upscale eatery in town. An attached note claims a server in the victim's restaurant spilled food, coffee, wine or salad dressing on a diner's expensive suit of clothes, and demands reimbursement for dry cleaning costs. As the amount fraudulently claimed from each victim is relatively low, some will give the scammers the benefit of the doubt, or simply seek to avoid the nuisance of further action, and pay the claim.

The scam's return address is a drop box; the rest of the contact information is fictional or belongs to an innocent third party. The original dry cleaning shop, which has nothing to do with the scheme, receives multiple irate enquiries from victimised restaurateurs.

=== Clip joint ===
A clip joint or "fleshpot" is an establishment, usually a strip club or entertainment bar, typically one claiming to offer adult entertainment or bottle service, in which customers are tricked into paying money and receive poor, or no, goods or services in return. Typically, clip joints suggest the possibility of sex, charge excessively high prices for watered-down drinks, then eject customers when they become unwilling or unable to spend more money. The product or service may be illicit, offering the victim no recourse through official or legal channels.

=== Coin-matching game ===
Also called a coin smack or smack game, two operators trick a victim during a game where coins are matched. One operator begins the game with the victim, then the second joins in. When the second operator leaves briefly, the first colludes with the victim to cheat the second operator. After rejoining the game, the second operator, angry at "losing," threatens to call the police. The first operator convinces the victim to pitch in hush money, which the two operators later split.

=== Fraudulent collection agencies ===
A consumer inquires about a payday loan or short-term credit online and is asked for a long list of personal information. The lender is a shell firm; the loan might never be made, but the victim's personal information is now in the hands of scammers who sell it to a fraudulent collection agency. That agency then launches into a series of harassing phone calls at all hours (often to the victim's workplace), attempting to obtain bank account numbers (allowing the account to be drained through direct withdrawal) or impersonating police (sometimes with caller ID spoofing) to threaten the victim with arrest. Fake debt collectors often refuse to provide a legally required written "validation notice" of the debt, provide no evidence a debt is actually owed and demand payment using a money transfer service like MoneyGram or Western Union with poor traceability and no chargeback protection. The underlying debt either does not exist, is not valid due to a statute of limitations or does not lawfully belong to the entity making the calls; in some cases, the victim is a target of identity theft.

The scammers operate under multiple names, many of which are intended to be mistaken for official or government agencies. The fraudulent calls often originate from abroad; any money extorted is immediately taken out of the country.

=== Fraudulent law firms ===
A bogus or dishonest law firm is a valuable tool to a scammer in various ways. It can send requests for upfront payments in relation to inheritances coming from unknown relatives, a form of advance fee fraud. It also makes an effective fraudulent collection agency, as victims fear having to pay their own counsel hundreds of dollars per hour to defend against frivolous, vexatious or completely unfounded claims.

In some cases, the dishonest lawyer is merely part of a larger fraudulent scheme. A real estate fraud may involve taking deposits for a project under construction where, in theory, the lawyer is holding the money in escrow, guarding down payments as trust fund assets until a real estate deal closes. When the project is never completed, investors seek their money back but find the supposed trust fund is empty, as both lawyer and real estate developer are fraudulent.

=== Insurance fraud ===
Insurance fraud includes a wide variety of schemes in which insureds attempt to defraud their own insurance carriers, but when the victim is a private individual, the con artist tricks the mark into damaging, for example, the con artist's car, or injuring the con artist, in a manner that the con artist can later exaggerate. One relatively common scheme involves two cars, one for the con artist, and the other for the shill. The con artist will pull in front of the victim, and the shill will pull in front of the con artist before slowing down. The con artist will then slam on his brakes to "avoid" the shill, causing the victim to rear-end the con artist. The shill will accelerate away, leaving the scene. The con artist will then claim various exaggerated injuries in an attempt to collect from the victim's insurance carrier despite having intentionally caused the accident. Insurance carriers, who must spend money to fight even those claims they believe are fraudulent, frequently pay out thousands of dollars—a tiny amount to the carrier despite being a significant amount to an individual—to settle these claims instead of going to court.

A variation of this scam occurs in countries where insurance premiums are generally tied to a bonus–malus rating: the con artist will offer to avoid an insurance claim, settling instead for a cash compensation. Thus, the con artist is able to evade a professional damage assessment, and get an untraceable payment in exchange for sparing the mark the expenses of a lowered merit class.

=== Melon drop ===
The melon drop is a scam similar to the Chinese version Pèngcí in which a scammer will cause an unsuspecting mark to bump into them, causing the scammer to drop an item of alleged value. The scam originally targeted Japanese tourists due to the high price of honeymelon (cantaloupe) in Japan. The scammer may receive upwards of $100 for "compensation". The scam has also been called broken glasses scam or broken bottle scam where the scammer will pretend the mark broke a pair of expensive glasses or use a bottle of cheap wine, liquor or a bottle filled with water and demand compensation. Asian tourists are often the primary target.

Pèngcí is a scam originating in China in which scammers feign injury in traffic accidents in order to extort money from drivers. Scammers also may place ostensibly expensive, fragile items (usually porcelain) in places where they may easily be knocked over, allowing them to collect damages when the items are damaged.

== Gambling tricks ==
=== Baltimore Stockbroker / Psychic Sports Picks ===
The Baltimore Stockbroker scam relies on mass-mailing or emailing. The scammer begins with a large pool of marks, numbering ideally a power of two such as 1024 (2^{10}). The scammer divides the pool into two halves, and sends all the members of each half a prediction about the future outcome of an event with a binary outcome (such as a stock price rising or falling, or the win/loss outcome of a sporting event). One half receives a prediction that the stock price will rise (or a team will win, etc.), and the other half receives the opposite prediction. After the event occurs, the scammer repeats the process with the group that received a correct prediction, again dividing the group in half and sending each half new predictions. After several iterations, the "surviving" group of marks has received a remarkable sequence of correct predictions, whereupon the scammer then offers these marks another prediction, this time for a fee. The next prediction is, of course, no better than a random guess, but the previous record of success makes it seem to the mark to be a prediction worth great value.

For gambling propositions with more than two outcomes, for example in horse racing, the scammer begins with a pool of marks with number equal to a power of the number of outcomes, and divides the marks at each step into the corresponding number of groups, thus insuring that one group receives a correct prediction at each step. This requires a larger number of marks at the beginning, but fewer steps are required to gain the confidence of the marks who receive successful predictions, because the probability of a correct prediction is lower at each step, and thus it seems more remarkable.

The scam relies on selection bias and survivorship bias and is similar to publication bias (the file-drawer effect) in scientific publishing (whereby successful experiments are more likely to be published, rather than failures).

This particular scam received its name as a result of Frank Deford's novel Cut 'n' Run (1973), in which a stockbroker in Baltimore goes to several different bars and predicts the outcome of the upcoming Johnny Unitas-era Baltimore Colts' next game. He makes an equal number of win/lose predictions and never returns to the bars where he is wrong. For the final bet, he predicts in one bar that the Colts will lose, and they do. After seeing him correctly predict six football games in a row, the patrons are enamored when he returns to the bar the next week and claims "football is a hobby, my real business is the stock market". He receives an influx of new business and tells his new customers that the market is "adjusting" any time the Dow-Jones Industrial Average drops.

Several authors mention the scam: Daniel C. Dennett in Elbow Room (where he calls it the touting pyramid); David Hand in The Improbability Principle; and Jordan Ellenberg in How Not to Be Wrong.

Ellenberg reports often hearing of the scam told as an illustrative parable, but he could not find a real-world example of anyone carrying it out as an actual scam. The closest he found was when illusionist Derren Brown presented it in his television special The System in 2008. Brown's intent was merely to convince his mark that he had a foolproof horse race betting system rather than to scam the mark out of money. However, Ellenberg goes on to describe how investment firms do something similar by starting many in-house investment funds, and closing the funds that show the lowest returns before offering the surviving funds (with their record of high returns) for sale to the public. The selection bias inherent in the surviving funds makes them unlikely to sustain their previous high returns.

=== Lottery fraud by proxy ===
Lottery fraud by proxy is a scam in which the scammer buys a lottery ticket with old winning numbers. The scammer then alters the date on the ticket so that it appears to be from the day before, and therefore a winning ticket. They then sell the ticket to the mark, claiming it is a winning ticket, but for some reason, they are unable to collect the prize (not eligible, etc.). The particular cruelty in this scam is that if the mark attempts to collect the prize, the fraudulently altered ticket will be discovered and the mark held criminally liable. This con was featured in the movie Matchstick Men, where Nicolas Cage teaches it to his daughter. A twist on the con was shown in Great Teacher Onizuka, where the more-than-gullible Onizuka was tricked into getting a "winning ticket". The ticket was not altered, but the daily newspaper reporting the day's winning numbers was altered with a black pen.

In the USSR this scam left three people dead in 1977, after a mark re-sold a fraudulent ticket and the second buyer engaged a criminal to "clear the issue", leading to the murder of the original mark and two family members. The investigations using a fake lottery uncovered a large group of marks all targeted by a single artist, a disgruntled former employee of the Mint who used his insider knowledge and skills to produce the high-quality forged tickets.

=== Three-card Monte ===
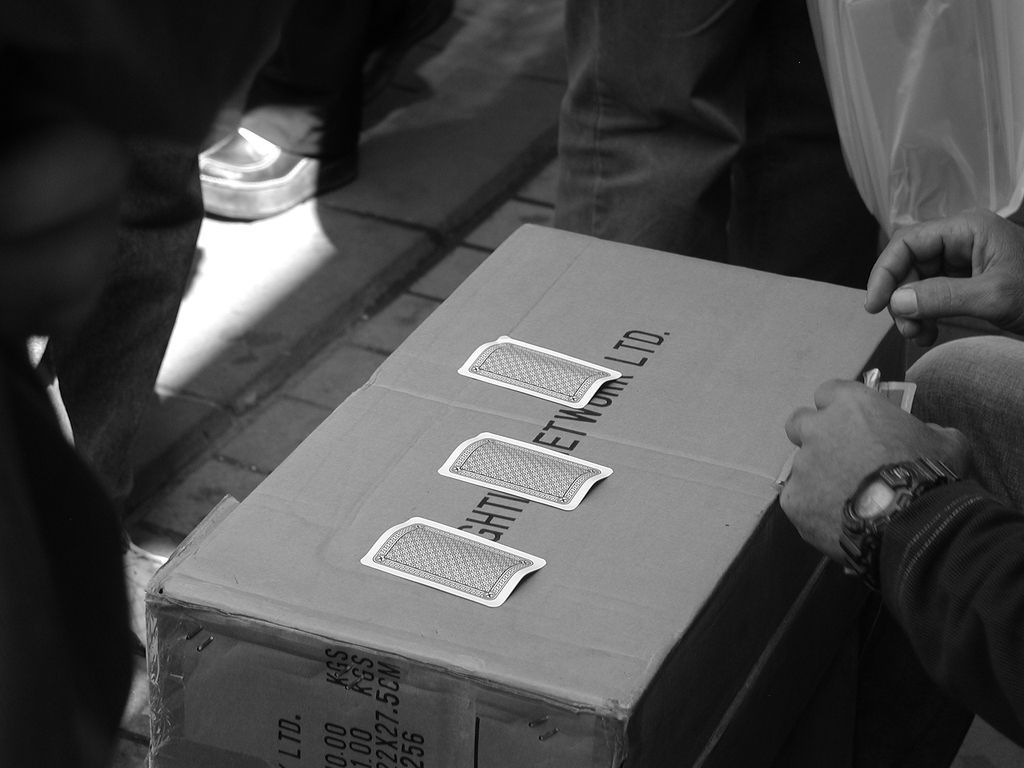
Three-card Monte

Three-card Monte, "find the queen", the "three-card trick", or "follow the lady" is essentially the same as the centuries-older shell game or thimblerig (except for the props). The trickster shows three playing cards to the audience, one of which is a queen (the "lady"), then places the cards face-down, shuffles them around, and invites the audience to bet on which one is the queen. At first the audience is skeptical, so the shill places a bet, and the scammer allows him to win. In one variation of the game, the shill will (apparently surreptitiously) peek at the lady, ensuring that the mark also sees the card. This is sometimes enough to entice the audience to place bets, but the trickster uses sleight of hand to ensure that he always loses, unless the con man decides to let him win, hoping to lure him into betting much more. The mark loses whenever the dealer chooses to make him lose.

A variation on this scam exists in Barcelona, Spain, but with the addition of a pickpocket. The dealer and shill behave in an overtly obvious manner, attracting a larger audience. When the pickpocket succeeds in stealing from a member of the audience, he signals the dealer. The dealer then shouts the word "aguas" – colloquial for "Watch Out!" – and the three split up. The audience is left believing that the police are coming, and that the performance was a failed scam.

A variant of this scam exists in Mumbai, India. The shill says loudly to the dealer that his cards are fake and that he wants to see them. He takes the card and folds a corner and says in a hushed voice to the audience that he has marked the card. He places a bet and wins. Then he asks the others to place bets as well. When one of the audience bets a large sum of money, the cards are switched.

== Spurious qualifications or endorsements ==
=== Diploma mill ===
Governmental bodies maintain a list of entities which accredit educational institutions. The US Department of Education, for instance, oversees higher education accreditation in the United States.

Most diploma mills are not accredited by such an entity, although many obtain accreditation from other organizations (such as accreditation mills or corrupt foreign officials) to appear legitimate. Graduates of these institutions risk that the qualifications gained at these institutions may not be sufficient for further study, lawful employment or professional licensure as their issuers do not hold locally-valid accreditation to grant the degrees.

Some diploma mills perform no instruction or examination, instead issuing credentials based on payment and "life experience". A few have unknowingly issued degrees and credentials to companion animals.

The Doctor of Divinity title is particularly prone to misuse. In the United Kingdom it is an earned postdoctoral credential which requires a string of publications, but in the United States any church may confer it as an honorary title; ordination mills readily grant this doctorate for a moderate fee and token amount of study.

=== Vanity publications and awards ===
A vanity press is a pay-to-publish scheme where a publishing house, typically an author mill, obtains the bulk of its revenues from authors who pay to have their books published instead of from readers purchasing the finished books. As the author bears the entire financial risk, the vanity press profits even if the books are not promoted (or badly promoted) and do not sell. The growth of print on demand, which allows small quantities of books to be printed cheaply, has accelerated this trend.

Vanity publishing is not the same as self-publishing, in that self-published authors own their finished books and control their distribution, relying on a print shop solely to turn camera-ready content into printed volumes. In a vanity press, the author takes the financial risk while the publisher owns the printed volumes.

A vanity award is an award which the recipient purchases, giving the false appearance of a legitimate honour. These are closely related to the Who's Who scam, where a biographic subject pays for a vanity listing in a printed directory.

==== Who's Who scam ====
Operators of fraudulent "Who's Who"-type directories would offer listings or "membership" to purchasers who are often unaware of the low rates the directories in question are consulted.

==== World Luxury Association ====
The World Luxury Association is a self-proclaimed international organisation based in China that offers "official registration" for luxury brands, and inclusion in an "official list" of luxury brands, in return for a fee.

== Online scams ==
=== Fake antivirus ===
Computer users unwittingly download and install rogue security software, malware disguised as antivirus software, by following the messages which appear on their screen. The software then pretends to find multiple viruses on the victim's computer, "removes" a few, and asks for payment in order to take care of the rest. They are then linked to con artists' websites, professionally designed to make their bogus software appear legitimate, where they must pay a fee to download the "full version" of their "antivirus software".

=== Phishing ===
Phishing is a modern scam in which the artist communicates with the mark, masquerading as a representative of an official organization with which the mark is doing business, in order to extract personal information which can then be used, for example, to steal money. In a typical instance, the artist sends the mark an email pretending to be from a company, such as eBay. It is formatted exactly like email from that business, and will ask the mark to "verify" some personal information at the website, to which a link is provided, in order to "reactivate" his blocked account. The website is fake but designed to look exactly like the business' website. The site contains a form asking for personal information such as credit card numbers, which the mark feels compelled to give or lose all access to the service. When the mark submits the form (without double-checking the website address), the information is sent to the swindler.

A similar caller ID spoofing scheme exists with misleading telephone calls ("vishing") facilitated by Internet telephony. A fraudster can make calls through an Internet-PSTN gateway to impersonate banks, police, schools or other trusted entities. A random dialer computer or auto-dialer can impersonate healthcare providers to get Social Security numbers and birthdates from elderly patients recently released from the hospital. The auto-dialer call states it is from a reputable hospital or a pharmacy and the message explains the need to "update records" to be from the hospital or a pharmacy.

Other online scams include advance-fee fraud, bidding fee auctions ("penny auctions"), click fraud, domain slamming, various spoofing attacks, web-cramming, and online versions of employment scams, romance scams, and fake rewards.

=== Fake support call ===
Unsuspecting computer owners and users are targeted by people claiming to be from Windows, i.e., Microsoft or from their internet provider and then telling them that their computer/machine is creating errors and they need to correct the faults on their computers. Scammers persuade people to go to one site or another to see these so-called errors. They are then required to give their credit card details in order to purchase some form of support, after which they are asked to allow remote connection to the "error-laden" computer so that the problem(s) may be fixed. At this point the victim's computer is infected with malware, spyware, or remote connection software.

=== Call forwarding scam ===
Call forwarding scam involves a fraudster tricking the victim into dialing a specific phone number, which then reroutes all incoming calls and text messages the victim receives to the scammer's device. The scammer in turn intercepts bank messages and one-time passwords, while the victim remains unaware.

=== Bank login scam ===
A scammer convinces a victim to log in to a bank and convince them that they are receiving money. Some victims of the technical support scam may have their information sold or traded to a new organization that will cold-call them and tell them that they are entitled to a refund for the support they have previously paid for. Alternatively, the scammer may impersonate a security company and convince the victim that hackers are manipulating their bank account. The goal is for the scammer to transfer money between the user's accounts and to use HTML editing in the browser to make it appear as though new money has been transferred into the account by a legitimate company. The scammer "makes a mistake" and sends a larger amount of money than what he initially said he would send, then convinces the victim that they must refund the mistakenly sent extra money to the scammer via a wire transfer, money order, or gift cards.

== Religion-based schemes ==
=== The Affinity Church scam ===
Claiming to share someone else's viewpoint is the sneaky cover many church scam artists use. Pretending to share their faith lulls members of religious organizations into thinking a scammer is genuine. Often claiming some kind of divine guidance, using religious slogans, or claiming to be raising funds for a worthy cause, church scammers invite their new friends to invest in what turns out to be nothing more than a Ponzi scheme. This is such a common crime that the state of Arizona listed affinity scams of this type as its number one scam for 2009. In one recent nationwide religious scam, churchgoers are said to have lost more than $50 million in a phony gold bullion scheme, promoted on daily telephone prayer chains, in which they thought they could earn a huge return.

== Other confidence tricks and scams ==
=== Bar bill scam ===
The bar bill scam is common in Europe, especially Budapest, Hungary. A mark, usually a man who is a tourist, is approached by an attractive woman or pair of women who start a conversation, such as asking for directions (pretending to have mistaken the tourist for a local). After a bit of conversation, the women will suggest that they go to a bar that they know of. While there, they order many entrées and drinks and encourage the mark to do the same. Either the menu does not have prices on it or the menu is later switched with one that has higher prices.

When the bill comes, it is many times larger than expected. The women have only a small amount of cash on them, and ask the mark to pay for the bill. The mark is forced to pay before leaving (sometimes with threats of violence), and directed to an ATM on the premises where they can withdraw cash. The women apologize profusely for the situation and arrange to meet the next day to pay them back, but they do not show. In truth, the women are working with the bar and receive a cut of the payment.

The con can also be performed with a well-dressed man or a gregarious local rather than an attractive woman. A variation on this is to have a taxi driver recommend the bar to the passenger, who enters alone and orders, not realizing that they will be charged an exorbitant bill. The taxi driver receives a cut of the payment.

=== Beijing tea ===
The Beijing tea scam is a famous variation of the clip joint scam practised in and around Beijing and some other large Chinese cities. The artists (usually female and working in pairs) will approach tourists and try to make friends. After chatting, they will suggest a trip to see a tea ceremony, claiming that they have never been to one before. The tourist is never shown a menu, but assumes that this is how things are done in China. After the ceremony, the bill is presented to the tourist, sometimes charging upwards of $100 per head. The artists will then hand over their bills, and the tourists are obliged to follow suit. Similar scams involving restaurants, coffee shops and bars also take place.

=== Big Store ===
The Big Store is a technique for convincing the mark of the legitimacy of the grifters' operation. The store is filled with elaborate sets and is run by a large team of con artists. Often a building is rented and furnished to seem like a substantial business. The "betting parlor" setup in The Sting is an example.

In 2014, a rural co-operative in Nanjing, China constructed an entire brick-and-mortar fake bank with uniformed clerks behind counters. The unlicensed bank operated for a little over a year, then defaulted on its obligations, swindling Chinese savers out of 200 million Chinese yuan. The fraudulent cryptocurrency scheme, OneCoin, is a European example.

=== Blessing scam ===
The blessing scam targets elderly Chinese immigrant women, convincing them that an evil spirit threatens their family and that this threat can be removed by a blessing ceremony involving a bag filled with their savings, jewelry or other valuables. During the ceremony, the con artists switch the bag of valuables with an identical bag with valueless contents and make off with the victim's cash or jewelry.

=== Change raising ===
Change raising, also known as a quick change or short change scam, is a common short con and involves an offer to change an amount of money with someone, while at the same time taking change or bills back and forth to confuse the person as to how much money is actually being changed. The most common form, "the Short Count", has been featured prominently in several movies about grifting, notably The Grifters, Criminal, Nine Queens, and Paper Moon. For example, a con artist targeting a cashier apologetically uses a ten-dollar bill to pay for an item costing less than a dollar, claiming not to have any smaller bills; the change of over nine dollars will include either nine singles or a five and four singles. The con artist then claims to have found that he had a dollar bill, after all, and offers to change it and the nine dollars for the original ten. If the con artist can manipulate the clerk into handing over the ten-dollar bill first, the con artist can then give it back to the clerk in place of one of the singles the con artist was expected to give the clerk. The con artist then pretends to notice he has "mistakenly" given the clerk nineteen dollars instead of ten; producing another single, the con artist suggests he add this to the nineteen and let the clerk give him back an even twenty.

The scam relies on the cashier placing small bills in the register where they will be mixed with existing bills, and the cashier's failure to notice that the nineteen dollars given by the con artist included ten dollars that belonged to the store in the first place (the money that should've been given back for the $10 that was handed over early). Thus the con artist has stolen ten dollars, minus the cost of the cheap item that was purchased (effectively stealing over nine dollars). The con artist starts with twelve dollars (the original ten-dollar bill and two singles), then leaves with a twenty and also keeps one of the singles (the one that was "mistakenly" switched with the $10). (The cashier should have noticed that the con artist overpaid by $9, not $19, and thus when the con artist produces the second $1 bill, the cashier should hand back $10, not $20.) To avoid this con, clerks should keep each transaction separate and never permit the customer to take change before handing over the original payment.

Another variation is to flash a $20 bill to the clerk, then ask for something behind the counter. When the clerk turns away, the con artist can swap the bill he is holding to a lesser bill. The clerk might then make change for the larger bill, without noticing it has been swapped. The technique may work better when bills are the same color at a glance like, for instance, U.S. dollar bills. A similar technique exists when a con artist asks to use a very large denomination bill to purchase a cheap item. The con artist distracts the clerk with conversation while the clerk is preparing the change, in hopes that the clerk will hand over the large amount of change without realizing that the con artist never actually handed over the large bill. Sometimes cab drivers in India try a similar con, when customers require some change back. For example, they may pay $100 for a $60 ride and expect a return of $40. But the con would say that he only received $10 and in fact needs $50 more. The mark is baffled, trying to remember and of course, the con has swiftly switched the $100 bill with a $10 one, waving it to show that this was really what the mark gave to him. Since the con has now made the mark look suspicious, the mark feels guilty and pays up. This scenario can also be created in markets, when vendors sometimes team up and support each other's cons, if the mark tries to resist.

Another variant is to use confusing or misdirected language.

=== Dropped wallet scam ===
The dropped wallet scam usually targets tourists. The con artist pretends to accidentally drop his wallet in a public place. After an unsuspecting victim picks up the wallet and offers it to the con artist, the scam begins. The artist accuses the victim of stealing money from the wallet and threatens to call the police, scaring the victim into returning the allegedly stolen money. Cases have been reported in eastern Europe and major cities or railway stations in China.

A variation of the pigeon drop is also based around a dropped wallet.

=== Fake casting agent scam ===
In this scam, the confidence artist poses as a casting agent for a modeling agency searching for new talent. The aspiring model is told that he will need a portfolio or comp card. The mark will pay an upfront fee to have photos and create his portfolio, after which he will be sent on his way in the hope that his agent will find him work in the following weeks. Of course, he never hears back from the confidence artist.

The fake-agent scam is often targeted against industry newcomers, since they will often lack the experience required to spot such tricks. Legitimate talent agencies advise that a genuine talent agent will never ask for money up-front, as they make their entire living from commissions on their clients' earnings.

This scam is portrayed in That '70s Show with Donna proving to Jackie that "anyone can be a model".

=== Phony job offer scam ===
Very similar to the casting agent scam is the "job offer" scam in which a victim receives an unsolicited e-mail claiming that they are in consideration for hiring to a new job. The confidence artist will usually obtain the victim's name from social networking sites, such as LinkedIn and Monster.com. In many cases, those running the scams will create fake websites listing jobs which the victim is seeking, then contact the victim to offer them one of the positions.

If the victim responds to the initial e-mail, the scammer will send additional messages to build up the victim's assurance that they are in the running, or have already been selected, for a legitimate job. This will include asking for the victim's resume as well as assurances that a phone interview will be the "next step in the hiring process".

The goal of the job offer scam is to convince the victim to release funds or bank account information to the scammer. There are two common methods. The first is to tell the victim that they must take a test to qualify for the job and then send links to training sites which sell testing material and e-books for a fee. Or, the victim is provided with an actual online test, which is usually a fake website created by copying questions from actual certification examinations, such as the Professional in Human Resources (PHR) certification or the project manager's exam. If the victim pays for the study material, that will usually be the end of the scam and the scammer will break off further contact.

In a second, more sinister variation, the scammer will tell the victim they have been hired for a job and request access to bank accounts and routing numbers in order to enter the "new hire" into the company's payroll system. This may also involve emails containing fake tax forms attempting to gain the victim's Social Security number and other personally identifiable information. If the victim complies, their bank account will be emptied and their personal information used to commit identity theft.

=== Fraudulent directory solicitations ===
In this scam, tens of thousands of solicitations in the guise of an invoice are mailed to businesses nationwide. They may contain a disclaimer such as "This is a solicitation for the order of goods or services, or both, and not a bill, invoice, or statement of account due. You are under no obligation to make any payments on account of this offer unless you accept this offer." (from 39 U.S.C. § 3001(d)(2)(A)) or "THIS IS NOT A BILL. THIS IS A SOLICITATION. YOU ARE UNDER NO OBLIGATION TO PAY THE AMOUNT STATED ABOVE UNLESS YOU ACCEPT THIS OFFER." (from U.S. Postal Service Domestic Mail Manual §CO31, Part 1.2) The disclaimers are otherwise designed to appear to be invoices or renewals of existing display advertising in a trade directory or publication. The correspondence is formatted like an invoice, often with a sequential identification number, date, personalized description of the information to be published, payment details and total amount due, which includes a token discount if paid within a specified time period. In some cases, the company's current advertisement clipped from an existing publication (such as Thomas Register, Hotel and Travel Index or Official Meeting Facilities Guide) is attached to a solicitation for advertising in an unaffiliated, rival publication that operates from a drop box.

One variant sends a "Final Notice of Domain Listing" from an entity calling itself "Domain Services", which claims "Failure to complete your Domain name search engine registration by the expiration date may result in cancellation of this offer making it difficult for your customers to locate you on the web." The list of prospective victims is obtained from Internet domain WHOIS listings, and the solicitations look like a renewal of an existing domain name registration or listing. The "registration" actually offers nothing beyond a vague claim that the entity sending the solicitation will submit the victim's domain name to existing search engines for an inflated fee. It does not obligate the vendor to publish a directory, renew the underlying domain in any ICANN-based registry or deliver any tangible product.

A similar scheme uses solicitations which appear to be invoices for local yellow pages listings or advertisements. As anyone can publish a yellow page directory, the promoted book is not the incumbent local exchange carrier's local printed directory but a rival, which may have limited distribution if it appears at all. Instead of clearly stating audited circulation, the solicitations will confusingly claim to "offer 50,000 copies" or claim "thousands of readers" without indicating whether the inferred quantity of directories was actually printed, let alone sold.

Public records listing legal owners of new registered trademarks are also mined as a source of addresses for fraudulent directory solicitations.

The intent is that a small fractional percentage of businesses either mistake the solicitations for invoices (paying them) or mistake them for a request for corrections and updates to an existing listing (a tactic to obtain a businessperson's signature on the document, which serves as a pretext to bill the victim).

One such vendor, World Trade Register (aka European Trade Register, World Company Register, World Business Directory, all related to EU Business Services Ltd), claims "To update your company profile, please print, complete and return this form. Updating is free of charge. Only sign if you want to place an insertion." Only later does it become clear that signing the form incurs a nearly €1000/year fee for an advertisement of questionable value.

=== Jam auction ===
In this scam, the confidence artist poses as a retail sales promoter, representing a manufacturer, distributor, or set of stores. The scam requires assistants to manage the purchases and money exchanges while the pitchman maintains a high energy level. Passersby are enticed to gather and listen to a pitchman standing near a mass of appealing products. The trickster entices by referring to the high-end products, but claims to be following rules that he must start with smaller items. The small items are described, and "sold" for a token dollar amount – with as many audience participants as are interested in receiving an item.

The pitchman makes an emotional appeal such as saying "Raise your hand if you're happy with your purchase", and when hands are raised, directs his associates to return everyone's money (they keep the product). This exchange is repeated with items of increasing value to establish the expectation of a pattern. Eventually, the pattern terminates by ending the "auction" without reaching the high-value items, and stopping midway through a phase where the trickster retains the collected money from that round of purchases. Marks feel vaguely dissatisfied, but they have goods in their possession and the uplifting feeling of having demonstrated their own happiness several times. The marks do not realize that the total value of goods received is significantly less than the price paid in the final round. Auction/refund rounds may be interspersed with sales rounds that are not refunded, keeping marks off-balance and hopeful that the next round will refund. The jam auction has its roots in carny culture.

=== Money exchange ===
This scam occurs when exchanging foreign currency. If a large amount of cash is exchanged the victim will be told to hide the money away quickly before counting it ("You can't trust the locals"). A substantial amount will be missing.

In some cases, insisting on counting to make sure the money is all there is the basis for a clever scam. The scam is sometimes called the Santo Domingo Sting, after an incident that took place in Santo Domingo, Dominican Republic. A journalist, Joe Harkins, reported his involvement in the early 1990s. It works in countries where only banks and other designated parties are allowed to hold and exchange the local currency for US dollars at an "official" rate that is significantly lower than the "street" rate. It also requires a greedy tourist who wants to beat the official rate by dealing with illegal money changers. A person posing as an illegal money changer will approach the tourist with an offer to buy dollars at an illegal rate that may be even higher than the street rate. The changer offers to buy only large US currency, typically, a 100 dollar bill. As soon as the victim (the "mark") shows his $100 bill, the changer will actually count out and clearly show the promised amount of local currency. He then will push the local currency into the hands of the "mark" and urge they be counted as he takes the $100. "See, you've got the money. I'll wait while you make sure. Count it out loud so there is no mistake." And as the mark's careful count exceeds "street" rate, the changer pretends to realise he has overpaid the mark, and he becomes irrationally agitated and angry, accusing the mark of cheating. He grabs his money back, pushes the mark's bill back into his hands and takes back the pesos. The scam has been completed. The tourist has just lost $99. The mark has been handed back a prefolded $1 bill that has been swapped for the mark's $100 bill while he was distracted counting the local currency. (Until recently, US currency was largely uniform in size and color, meaning that when folded, a $1 and a $100 bill were almost indistinguishable. Even in 2014, careful folding of a US$100 bill easily conceals the switch). The money changer's pretended, but very credible, anger is a ruse to confuse the mark and delay his unfolding of the single bill until the scammer has departed.

=== Mystery shopping ===
This trick, a form of advance-fee scam, is perpetrated on people who wish to be mystery shoppers. A person is sent a money order, often from Western Union, or a check for a larger sum than a mystery purchase he is required to make, with a request to deposit it into his bank account, use a portion for a mystery purchase and fee, and wire the remainder through a wire transfer company such as Western Union or MoneyGram; the money is to be wired immediately as response time is being evaluated. The cheque is fraudulent, and is returned unpaid by the victim's bank, after the money has been wired. One scam involved fraudulent websites using a misspelled URL to advertise online and in newspapers under a legitimate company's name. It should be remembered that this is not the only type of mystery shopping scam taking place which involves money being paid, as it has been widely reported in the UK that shoppers should "Watch out for some online mystery shopping scams which will cost you money for either training or for signing up without the promise of any work."

Valid mystery shopping companies do not normally send their clients cheques prior to work being completed, and their advertisements usually include a contact person and phone number. Some fraudulent cheques can be identified by a financial professional. On February 3, 2009, the Internet Crime Complaint Center issued a warning on this scam. A legitimate company that occasionally sends prepayment for large transactions says "We do occasionally fund upfront for very large spend purchases but we use cheques or direct bank transfers which should mean you can see when they are cleared and so can be sure you really do have the money." It is standard practice for mystery shopping providers evaluating services such as airlines to arrange for the airfare to be issued beforehand at their own expense (usually by means of a frequent flyer reward ticket). In any case, it is unlikely that any bona-fide provider would allocate a high-value assignment to a new shopper or proactively recruit new ones for that purpose, preferring instead to work with a pool of existing pre-vetted experienced shoppers.

=== Pay up or be arrested scam ===
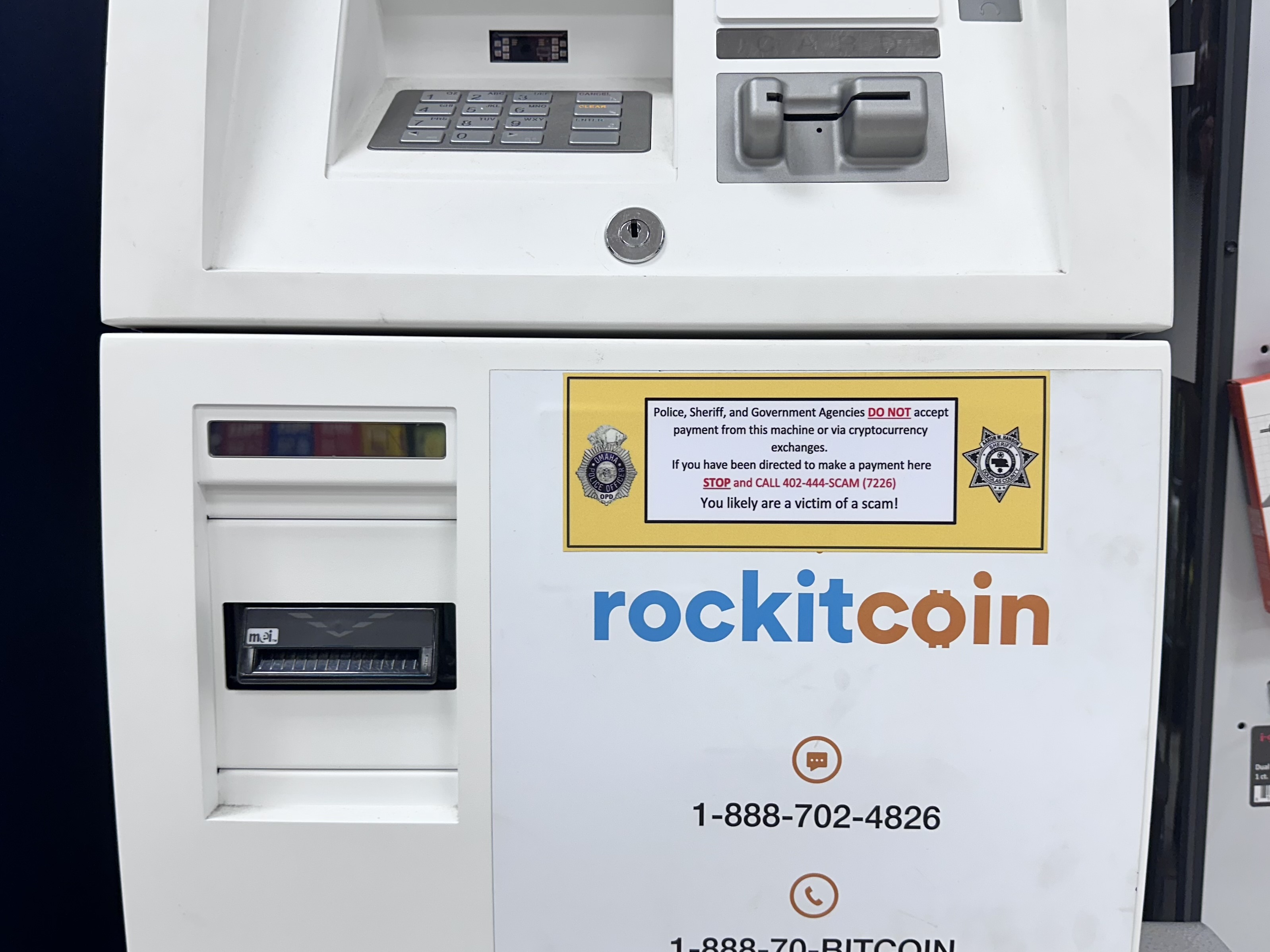
A Bitcoin ATM with a notice from local law enforcement warning of such scams

In this scam, done by phone, the caller threatens the victim with a fictitious arrest warrant. To make this threat seem real, the caller ID identifies the caller as that of local law enforcement. Victims are told they must pay a fine to avoid arrest. Fines are in the hundreds, or sometimes thousands, of dollars. The payment is requested through Western Union, prepaid card, cryptocurrency, or a similar form of untraceable currency exchange.

Cases have been reported in Florida, Georgia, Kansas, and Oregon.

=== Pigeon drop ===
The pigeon drop (also called the Jamaican Switch), which is depicted early in the film The Sting, involves the mark or pigeon assisting an elderly, weak or infirm stranger to keep a large sum of money safe for him. In the process, the stranger (actually a confidence trickster) puts his money with the mark's money in an envelope or briefcase, with which the mark is then to be entrusted. The container is first switched for an identical one which contains no money, and a situation is engineered giving the mark the opportunity to escape, with the money, from a perceived threat (e.g., local police or rowdies). If the mark does so, he is fleeing from his own money, which the con artist will have kept or handed off to an accomplice.

=== Pizza delivery scam ===
The pizza delivery scam firstly involves the scammer, who pretends to be a person who ordered the pizza. This scammer will then claim they are unable to pay for the pizza and will ask a stranger for help. The scammer will say that the delivery driver does not accept cash and only accepts cards. When the victim offers to pay, their card is skimmed and the PIN is captured. This scam is known to happen in the Greater Toronto Area.

=== Predatory journals ===
A number of predatory journals target academics to solicit manuscripts for publication. The journals charge high publication fees but do not perform the functions of legitimate academic journals—editorial oversight and peer review—they simply publish the work for cash. In this case, the mark's need for publications is the incentive for them to pay the fees. In some cases, predatory journals will use fictional editorial boards or use respected academics' names without permission to lend a veneer of credibility to the journal.

=== Promotional cheque ===
The victim is sent a document which looks, on its face, to be a coupon or a cheque for some small amount as "prize winnings". Buried in the fine print is something entirely different; an authorisation to slam the victim to an alternative telephone provider or even an authorisation for monthly direct withdrawals from the victim's bank account for "services" which were neither used nor desired.

=== Psychic surgery ===
Psychic surgery is a con game in which the trickster uses sleight of hand to apparently remove malignant growths from the mark's body. A common form of medical fraud in underdeveloped countries, it imperils victims who may fail to seek competent medical attention. The movie Man on the Moon depicts comedian Andy Kaufman undergoing psychic surgery. It can also be seen in an episode of Jonathan Creek and the movie Penn and Teller Get Killed.

=== Public transport ticket control scam ===
In this scam, the artists pose as ticket control staff on public transport connections. They tend to look for tourists as easy marks, and therefore target train connections from the airport. They will ask to see the passenger's tickets, and once they have found a suitable mark, will claim that something is wrong with the ticket they hold. They will then claim that an instant payment is required to avoid further legal troubles. In some cases, this scam is even committed by actual public transport staff seeking to rip off tourists.

In a variant on the scheme, the artists target tourists who are struggling with a ticketing machine, and offer to buy them the ticket they need. They select a relatively expensive ticket from the machine (for example a subscription) and pretend to buy that for the tourist with their own credit card, after which they ask the tourist to reimburse. However, in reality artists cancel the payment at the last moment and the ticket they 'take from the machine' is already in their hands. This ticket is usually a children's ticket, which opens the turnstiles, but will lead to the tourist running the risk of getting a fine in addition to being scammed.

=== Rain making ===
Rainmaking is a simple scam in which the trickster promises to use their power or influence over a complex system to make it do something favourable for the mark.

Classically, this was promising to make it rain, but more modern examples include getting someone's app "featured" on an app store, obtaining pass marks in a university entrance exam, or obtaining a job. It may be a politician implying that they can use their influence to get a contract awarded to the mark.

The trickster has no actual influence on the outcome, but if the favourable outcome happens anyway, they will then claim credit. If the event does not happen, the trickster may be able to claim they need more money until the event does happen.

This scam is shown in S03E11 of the television show The Wire. A corrupt politician takes bribes from a drug kingpin to secure construction permits, does nothing, but convinces him that he is working in his favor.

=== Recovery room ===
A recovery room scam is a form of advance-fee fraud where the scammer (sometimes posing as a law enforcement officer or attorney) calls investors who have been sold worthless shares (for example in a boiler-room scam), and offers to buy them, to allow the investors to recover their investments. A Nigerian 419 scam victim might receive a solicitation claiming to be from the Nigeria Economic and Financial Crimes Commission or another government agency.

The scam involves requiring an advance fee before the payment can take place, for example a "court fee".

The red flag in the 'recovery scam' is that the supposed investigative agency, unsolicited, approaches the victim. A legitimate law enforcement agency would normally allow the victim to make the first contact, and will not solicit an advance fee. The recovery scam has the victim's number only because it is operated by an accomplice of the original scammer, using a "sucker list" from the earlier fraud.

=== Rental scams ===
An apartment is listed for rent, often on an online forum such as Craigslist or Kijiji, at or just below market value. The vendor asks for first and last month's rent upfront, sometimes also asking for references or personal information from the prospective tenants. The rent payment clears the bank, the new tenants arrive with a truckload of worldly possessions on moving day to find that the same unit has been rented to multiple other new tenants and that the supposed "landlord" is not the owner of the property and is nowhere to be found. This kind of scam is often performed online on students planning to study abroad and seeking accommodation, as their means of checking the property are limited.

=== Rip deal ===
The Rip Deal is a swindle very popular in Europe and is essentially a pigeon drop confidence trick. In a typical variation, scammers will target a vendor such as a jeweler and offer to buy a substantial amount of wares at a large markup, provided they perform some type of under-the-table cash deal, originally exchanging Swiss francs for euros. This exchange goes through flawlessly, at considerable profit for the mark. Some time later, the scammers approach the mark with a similar proposition, but for a larger amount of money (and thus a larger return for the mark). Inspired by the confidence of the previous deal, the mark agrees—only to have his money and goods taken, by sleight-of-hand or violence, at the point of exchange. This scam was depicted in the movie Matchstick Men.

The same term is used to describe a crime where a vendor (especially a drug dealer) is killed to avoid paying for goods.

=== Unsolicited goods ===
Various schemes exist to bill victims for unsolicited goods or services.

A common scam targeting businesses is the toner bandit swindle; an unsolicited caller attempts to trick front-office personnel into providing manufacturer/model or serial numbers for office equipment and/or the name of the employee answering the call. Often, the call will be misrepresented as a "survey" or a "prize" award. The business then receives inflated invoices for unsolicited copy paper, copy machine toner, cleaning supplies, light bulbs, trash bags or other supplies, using the name of the person who answered the call to falsely claim this person ordered the items. When the business objects, the workers are threatened with lawsuits or harassed by bogus collection agencies.

Another, targeting the elderly, claims a free medical alert device has been ordered for a patient by a family member or medical doctor. An automated message says "that someone has ordered a free medical alert system for you, and this call is to confirm shipping instructions" before the call is transferred to a live operator who requests the elderly patient's credit card and identity card numbers. The device is not free; there is a high monthly charge for "monitoring". The family did not buy or order it, nor did a practitioner; the call is fraudulent.

=== Wedding planner scam ===
Wedding planner scams prey on the vulnerability of young couples, during a time when they are generally distracted, to embezzle funds for the planner's personal use. In the first type of fraud, the wedding planner company may offer a free wedding in a tie-up with a media station for a couple in need of charity, and collect the donations from the public that were meant for the wedding. In a second type of fraud, the planner asks couples to write checks to vendors (tents, food, cakes) but leave the name field empty, which the planner promises to fill in. As most vendors were never hired nor paid, the scam would then be exposed on the day of the wedding. A real life example is a Kansas TV station story of a wedding planner, Caitlin Hershberger Theis, who scammed three couples through her wedding planner consultancy, Live, Love and be Married using these two schemes.

== See also ==
- Great Reality TV Swindle
- Kansas City Shuffle
- List of criminal enterprises, gangs, and syndicates
- Manipulation (psychology)
- Scambaiting
- Sick baby hoax
