= Development hell =

Term for media projects stuck in development

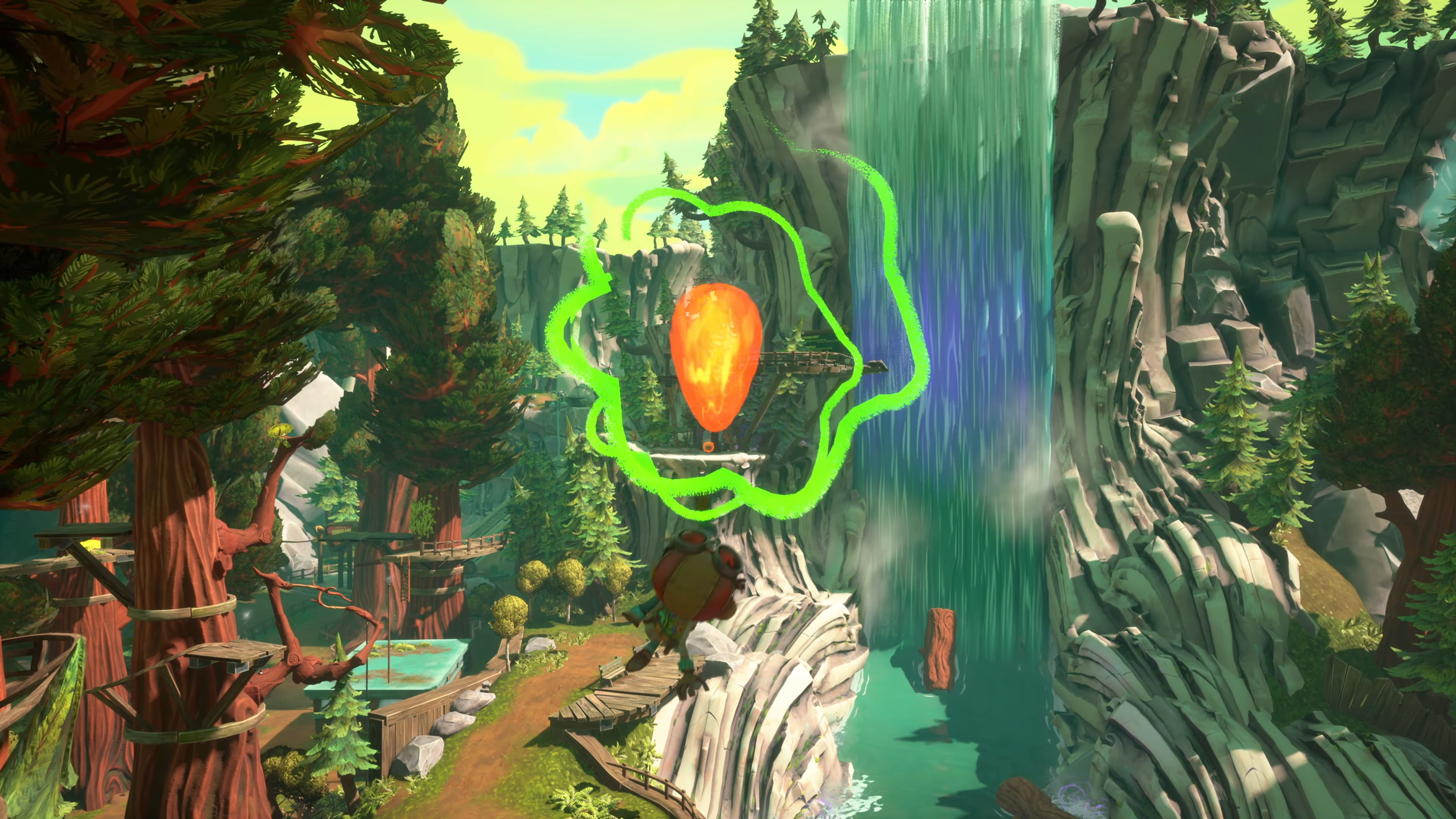
Psychonauts 2 was described as being in development hell due to the first game's poor commercial performance and multiple delays spanning several years combined.

Development hell, also known as development purgatory or development limbo, is media and software industry jargon for a project that remains in a stage of early development for a long time because of legal, technical, or artistic challenges. A work may move between many sets of artistic leadership, crews, scripts, game engines, or studios.

Some projects enter development hell because they were initially designed with ambitious goals but the difficulty of meeting those goals was underestimated, and attempts to meet those goals have repeatedly failed. Many projects that enter development hell are gradually abandoned by the involved parties and are never produced.

The term is also applied more generally to describe any project that has unexpectedly stalled in the planning or design phase, has failed to meet its originally expected date of completion, and is languishing in those phases for what is seen as an unreasonably long time. The related terms production hell and production limbo refer to situations in which a film has begun production but has remained unfinished for a long time without progressing to post-production.

== Causes ==
The concept artist and illustrator Sylvain Despretz has suggested that, "Development hell doesn't happen with no-name directors. It happens only with famous directors that a studio doesn't dare break up with. And that's how you end up for two years just, you know, polishing a turd. Until, finally, somebody walks away, at great cost."

With video games, slow progress and a lack of funds may lead developers to focus their resources elsewhere. Occasionally, completed portions of a game fail to meet expectations, with developers subsequently choosing to abandon the project rather than restart. The commercial failure of a released game may also result in any prospective sequels being delayed or cancelled.

== By medium ==
=== Film ===
Film industry companies buy the film rights to many popular novels, video games, and comic books, but often take years to bring those properties to the screen, having first made considerable changes to their plots, characters, and general tone. When this pre-production process takes too long, a project will often be abandoned or cancelled outright. Hollywood starts ten times as many projects as it releases. Less than two percent of all books that are optioned make it to the big screen.

As David Hughes, author of the book Tales from Development Hell (2003), has noted, one reason production is delayed is that, after producers, directors, and actors have been attached to a project, they may request script rewrites. Another cause of delay is that, after people have been attached to a project, they find they have conflicting interpretations of it or visions for it. For example, the director and the studio executives may have different opinions about a film's casting, plot, or budget. Development delays can also result when a lead actor or a key member of the production team withdraws from the project, takes ill, or dies; when there are labor strikes involving the writers, directors, crew, or cast; when there are disputes about intellectual property rights or contract terms; when there is turnover at the studio's executive level and the new leaders have a different vision; or when, due to changes in the wider economic, cultural, or political climate, the film's topic comes to be seen as no longer marketable.

Production hell refers to a situation in which a film has entered production but has remained in that phase for a long time without progressing to post-production.

If a film is in development but never receives the necessary production funds, another studio may execute a turnaround deal and successfully produce the film. For example, Columbia Pictures stopped production of E.T. the Extra-Terrestrial (1982). Universal Pictures then picked up the film and made it a success. When a studio completely abandons a film project, the costs are written off as part of the studio's overhead, thereby reducing taxable income.

=== Television ===
Television series can experience development hell between seasons, resulting in a long delay from one season to the next. Screenwriter Ken Aguado states that "development hell rarely happens in series television", because writers for a television series "typically only get a few cracks at executing a pilot, and if he or she doesn't deliver, the project will be quickly abandoned."

=== Video games ===
Video game development can be stalled for years, occasionally over a decade, often due to a project being moved to different production studios, multiple iterations of the game being created and abandoned, or difficulties with the development of the game software itself, such as loss of funding, overambitious scope, and poor development time management. In the computer industry, vaporware is the term for a product, typically computer hardware or software, that is announced to the general public but is late or never actually manufactured nor officially cancelled.

== See also ==
- Design by committee
- Law of triviality
- List of films with the longest production time
- Scope creep
- Turnaround (filmmaking)
- Vaporware
