= Pig in a poke (disambiguation) =

Pig in a poke is an idiom that refers to a kind of confidence trick.

A pig in a poke may also refer to:

- Pig in a Poke, an Australian TV series
- Pig in a Poke, a fictional game show seen in the film National Lampoon's European Vacation
- "A Pig in a Poke", an episode of the TV series The Worst Witch
- A Pig in a Poke, a 1971 novel by Yuri Koval
- Pig in a Poke, a 2009 French short film by Michel Muller originally titled Tragédie Grouick
- The Pig in the Poke, an episode of the web television series No Good Nick
