= Sick child =

Sick child or Sick Child may refer to:

- Sick child scam, confidence trick
- The Sick Child (Metsu), c.1660 oil painting by Gabriël Metsu
- The Sick Child (Munch), several works between 1885 and 1926 by Edvard Munch
