= Patent safe =

Type of confidence trick

The patent safe game was a confidence trick much practiced during the late American Civil War (ca. the mid-1860s) in and around New York City. It is a variation on the coin-matching game, in which the person to be scammed believes they are party to a trick only they and a second person know.

It was carried on principally in the neighborhood of the Hudson River Depot, and the complaints of the victims, to the police, were loud and numerous.

A contemporary account in The Secrets of the Great City describes the trick:

A stranger in the city would be accosted by a well-dressed individual, who would immediately begin a careless, friendly conversation. If the overtures of this individual are not repulsed in the first instance, he is soon joined by his accomplice, who professes to be a stranger to swindler number one.

The accomplice has in his possession a small brass ball or sphere, which he says is the model of a patent safe, much used by merchants in China and India. He is trying to introduce it in this country, and would like to show the gentleman his model. This brass ball is, to all appearance, solid, but to the initiated it is soon made hollow, by pressing on a certain inner circle, when the centre of the ball, which is in the shape of a small cone, drops out. The bottom of the cone may be unscrewed, when a little chamber is revealed, in which is a long piece of white paper, carefully folded and secreted. The other end of the cone, the top of it, can be unscrewed, and a second chamber is revealed, in which is a second piece of paper, exactly like the first.

Swindler number one takes the ball, examines it, and declares that it must be solid. The accomplice then presses the spring, and the centre drops out. He then unscrews one of the chambers, and reveals the paper to the admiring stranger and swindler number one. The accomplice's attention is here called away for a moment, and swindler number one, quietly winking at the stranger, abstracts the paper from the chamber, screws the lid on, and replaces the centre in the ball. Handing it back to the accomplice, he whispers to the stranger that he is about to win some money. He then bets the accomplice a sum which he thinks proportioned to the means of the stranger, that there is no paper in the ball. The bet is promptly taken by the accomplice. Swindler number one finds that he has no money, and asks the stranger to lend him the amount, offering to divide the winning with him. The stranger, who has seen the paper abstracted from the ball, is sure his new-found friend will win, and not being averse to making a little money on the spot, produces the desired amount, and hands it to his friend. The accomplice then opens the second chamber, reveals the duplicate piece of paper, and claims the stakes. The stranger loses his money, and is taught a useful lesson. He may apply to the police, if he wishes to do so, but the probabilities are that he will never see either his "friends", the safe, or his money, again.

—
