= Considered purchase =

Concept in economics

A considered purchase is a complex buying decision with a high degree of financial and/or emotional risk and reward. This process requires meaningful investigation and comparison by key decision makers and influencers prior to a transaction. All purchase decisions fall along a spectrum of complexity and consequence depending on the variables and relevant information involved. Unlike an impulse purchase, a considered purchase typically has a long purchase cycle and significant consequences. Considered purchase decisions exist in both the consumer and commercial realms involving both products and services.
