= George Appo =

American Criminal (1856–1930)

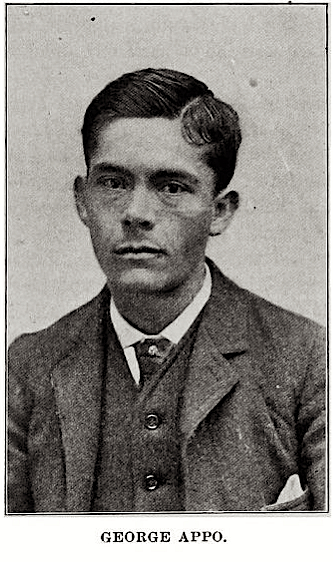
- George Appo (c. 1880)
- Born: July 4, 1856; New Haven, Connecticut, U.S.
- Died: May 17, 1930 (aged 73); New York City, U.S.

George Washington Appo (July 4, 1856 – May 17, 1930) was a pickpocket and fraudster whose manner of speech in a testimony became influential in depictions of criminals. Appo himself wrote an autobiography, unpublished, and became the subject of a book.

== Family ==
Appo's father, Quimbo Appo (or Lee Ah Bow), immigrated to New York from China in the 1840s. As a tea merchant, he was initially met with some esteem from white Americans. When he was tried for murdering his Irish landlady in 1859, they testified on his behalf against the Irish, whom the Protestant majority discriminated against. That changed as anti-Chinese sentiment in the United States grew, and in an 1876 trial, the press villified Quimbo. He spent time in prison and later the Matteawan State Hospital for the Insane.

Appo's mother, Catherine Fitzpatrick, was Irish American. After Appo's father's first trial, she left New York for California, where her brother lived. The ship wrecked en route, killing Appo's mother and sister.

Appo was a target of racism due to his ancestry; a 1898 publication, New York's Chinatown, presented his story as a warning against miscegenation.

== Incarceration and crimes ==
Appo served time in various New York penitentiaries including Sing Sing, the Blackwell's Island Penitentiary, and the upstate penitentiary in Dannemora. In a biography by Timothy Gilfoyle, the prison system of New York in the later half of the 19th century is depicted as being based upon the spoils system and largely corrupt. In the description of Sing Sing, Gilfoyle outlines the stove manufacturing operation the inmates were forced to carry out. Gilfoyle describes the penitentiary at Blackwell's Island (now Roosevelt Island) as having lax security, with inmates commonly escaping if they knew how to swim. Appo was also involved in a green goods scam in Poughkeepsie at one point in his life.

== See also ==
- Rebecca Salome Foster, an advocate for the rehabilitation of prisoners who would take on Appo as an assistant
