= Impulse purchase =

Unplanned decision by a consumer to buy a product or service just before purchase

In the field of consumer behavior, an impulse purchase or impulse buying is an unplanned decision by a consumer to buy a product or service, made just before a purchase. One who tends to make such purchases is referred to as an impulse purchaser or impulse buyer. Research findings suggest that emotions, feelings, and attitudes play a decisive role in purchasing, triggered by seeing the product or upon exposure to a well crafted promotional message.

== History ==
The original definition of an "impulse purchase" was a purchase that was unplanned by the consumer came out of the DuPont Consumer Buying Habits Study that occurred from 1948 to 1965. The definition of impulse buying was then updated, referring to the urge that a consumer feels when they want to buy an item right then, often causing cognitive dissonance for the consumer. This changed the focus of definition from the product to the consumer. From there, it has been expressed that impulse purchases are the result of one's own need to satisfy their wants in competition with their own rational and self-regulatory ideologies. An increase in impulse purchases has also been linked to the rise of materialism, which often causes people to splurge or make uninformed purchases.

== Types of impulse purchases ==
Hawkins Stern describes the four different types of impulse purchases that can be seen. The first is called "Pure Impulse Buying" where the consumer breaks their normal pattern of consumption. The next is called "Reminder Impulse Buying," which is when a consumer forgets to add an item to their shopping list, and when they see the item in the store, they remember that they need the item and purchase it. The third type of impulse purchase is "Suggestion Impulse Buying" where a consumer sees a product they have never seen before, and convinces themselves that they need the item even though this is their initial encounter with it. The last type of impulse purchase that Stern includes is "Planned Impulse Buying." This type of impulse buying occurs when a consumer goes into a store with certain items in mind, but is waiting for deals to entice them to make the purchase.

== Psychology behind impulse purchases ==
Impulse buying disrupts the normal decision making models in consumers' brains. The logical sequence of the consumers' actions is replaced with an irrational moment of self gratification. Impulse items appeal to the emotional side of consumers. Some items bought on impulse are not considered functional or necessary in the consumers' lives. Preventing impulse buying involves techniques such as setting budgets before shopping and taking time out before the purchase is made.

== Research findings ==
In a study done by Mattila and Wirtz in 2008, they found that when a consumer perceives that their environment is over-stimulating, they are more likely to make an impulse purchase.

In a recent study, Czrnecka, Schivinski, and Keles found that cultural values such as individualism and collectivism are determinants of impulsive buying and money budgeting. The researchers reported that different levels of globalisation in terms of global consumer culture influence proneness to impulsive buying and poor money budgeting.

Vernon T. Clover found that impulse buying greatly impacts the sales of a store, and without the income that comes from impulse purchases, retailers, such as bookstores in Clover's study, would not be able to stay open. Because of this, Clover implored retailers to make impulse items more readily available for customers.

In a study conducted in a collectivistic environment in 2023, Muhammad, Adeshola and Isiaku found that factors such as aesthetic appeal, scarcity promotions and discounted prices stimulate impulse buying behaviour on Instagram by Gen-Z. Positive emotional responses evoked by these factors also influence impulse buying, whereas the impact of negative emotional responses is found to be insignificant.

A study published in the June 2008 issue of the Journal of Consumer Research suggests that consumers are more susceptible to making impulsive purchases for one brand over another if they are distracted while shopping. In the study, Central Michigan University Psychology professor Bryan Gibson surveyed college students by measuring their preference for a variety of soft drinks, including Coke and Pepsi. Results of Gibson's study found that implicit attitudes, or those that people may not be conscious of and able to verbally express, predicted product choice only when participants were presented with a cognitive task, suggesting that implicit product attitudes may play a greater role in product choice when the consumer is distracted or is making an impulse purchase.

Researchers at the University of British Columbia and the Cheung Kong Graduate School of Business found that impulse spending is a behavior associated with disorganized environments. The study concluded that being surrounded by chaos impairs a person's ability to perform other tasks requiring 'brain' power, which results in a threat to a person's sense of personal control.

T.S. Anoop and Zillur Rahman, researchers at Indian Institute of Technology Roorkee have investigated Impulse buying in Online platforms. The study has published in Journal of Consumer Behavior and Electronic Commerce Research. The study found that Urge to Buy and Impulse buying are distinct and Platform based inertia leads to impulse buying. The researchers has defined the Online impulse buying as "the spontaneous and unplanned purchase behavior exhibited by consumers in digital environments, such as websites, mobile apps, or social media platforms. It occurs when individuals purchase online without prior intention or deliberation, often driven by immediate desires, emotional responses, or external stimuli."

== Examples of impulse purchases ==
Marketers and retailers tend to exploit the impulsive shopping urge which is tied to the basic want for instant gratification. For example, a shopper in a supermarket might not specifically be shopping for confectionery. However, candy, gum, mints, and chocolate are prominently displayed at the checkout aisles to trigger impulse buyers - and / or their children - to buy what they might not have otherwise considered. Alternatively, impulse buying can occur when a potential consumer spots something related to a product that stirs a particular passion in them, such as seeing a certain country's flag on the cover of a certain DVD. Sale items are displayed in much the same fashion.

In 1984 the Apple Macintosh 128K computer was described by one dealer as "the first $2,500 impulse item". Impulse buying can extend to other expensive items such as automobiles, couches, and home appliances. Automobiles in particular are as much an emotional purchase as a rational one. This in turn leads auto dealers all over the world to market their products in a rapid-fire, almost carnival-like manner designed to appeal to emotion over reason.

== See also ==
- Advertising
- Clearance sale
- Considered purchase
- Decision fatigue
- Marketing
- Marketing strategy
- Impulsivity
- Pig in a poke
- Product marketing
- Product placement
- Youth marketing
