= Letting the cat out of the bag =

English idiom

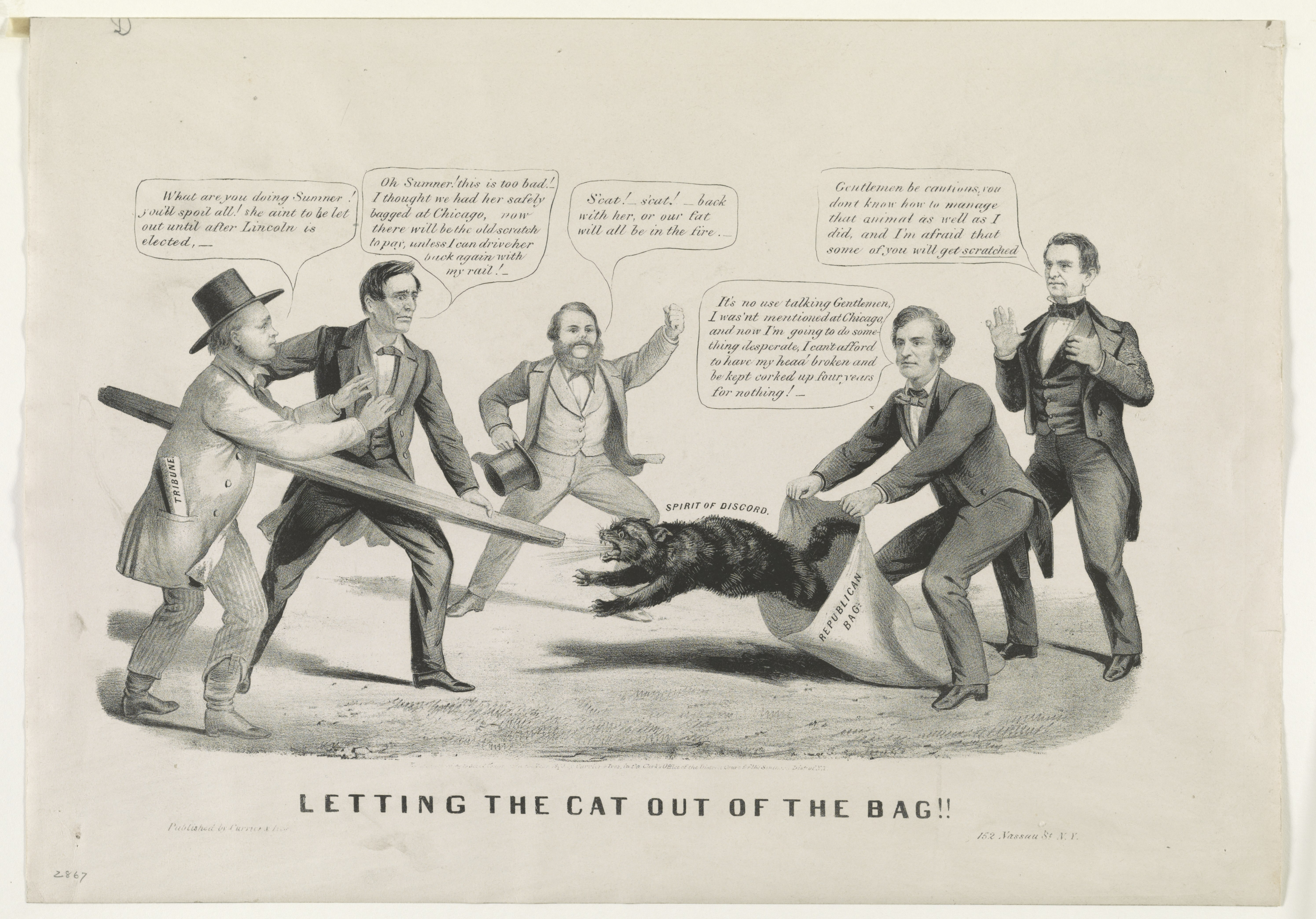
Political cartoon from 1860 featuring the phrase "letting the cat out of the bag!"

Letting the cat out of the bag (also ...box) is a colloquialism that means to reveal facts previously hidden. It could refer to revealing a conspiracy (friendly or not) to its target, letting an outsider into an inner circle of knowledge (e.g., explaining an in-joke), or the revelation of a plot twist in a movie or play. It also means to reveal a secret carelessly or by mistake.

== Etymology ==
The derivation of the phrase is not clear. One suggestion is that the phrase refers to the whip-like "cat o'nine tails", an instrument of punishment once used on Royal Navy vessels. The instrument was purportedly stored in a red sack, and a sailor who revealed the transgressions of another would be "letting the cat out of the bag".

Another suggested derivation is from the "pig in a poke" scam, where a customer buying a suckling pig in a sack would actually be sold a (less valuable) cat, and would not realize the deception until the bag was opened. Johannes Agricola referred to the expression "let the cat out of the bag" in a letter to Martin Luther on 4 May 1530 as referenced in Lyndal Roper's 2016 biography about Martin Luther, "Martin Luther: Renegade and Prophet".
