= Pigeon drop =

Confidence trick

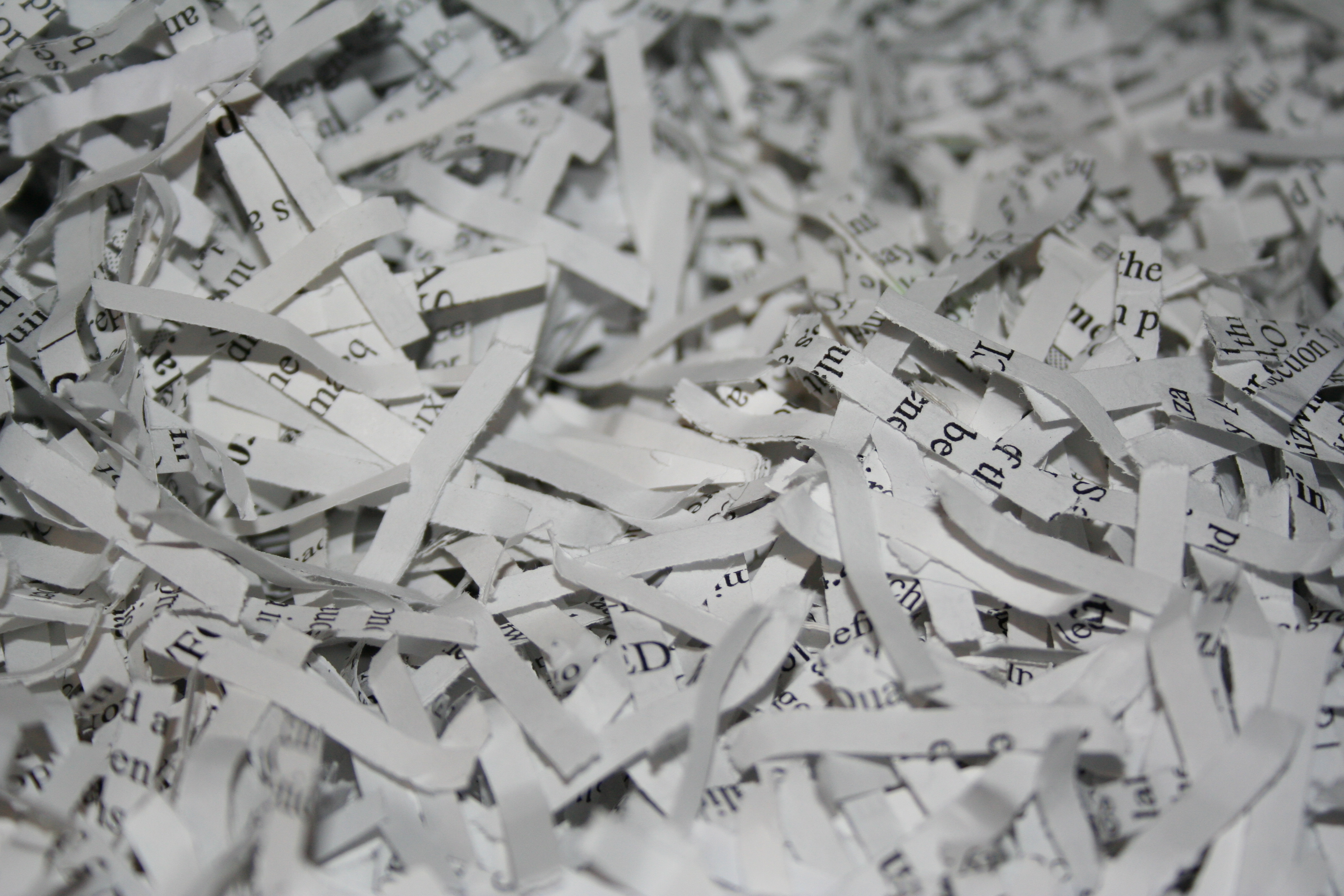
Shredded paper, which has been used as a decoy for cash in this scam

The pigeon drop or Spanish handkerchief or Chilean handkerchief is a confidence trick in which a victim (the mark or pigeon) is persuaded to pay to secure the right to a supposed large sum of money or valuable object. One of the con artists will typically claim to have found the money or valuable abandoned on the ground just before talking to the mark, or will place it on the ground beforehand and pretend to happen upon it at the same time as the mark, hence the term "drop".

== Method ==
Typically the scam involves two or three scammers (con artists) performing together to defraud the mark. One will arrange to "find" a valuable item along with the mark in a public place, such as by leaving it on the ground for the mark to find or approaching them with it in hand. A second scammer will pass by and enter the conversation, seeming to provide an independent opinion. One of the two scammers will pose as someone senior and knowledgeable, such as a lawyer, banker, or businessperson, or the senior might be a third scammer posing as a boss or authority called by one of the others.

The senior scammer will explain how the trio can cash in on the item legitimately, suggesting they split the proceeds three ways. However, he will ask each member of the group (including the mark) to put up some money first under a pretext, for example to prove financial solvency as a legal requirement, or to demonstrate that they can be trusted with the item during the process. The junior scammer will show enthusiasm and hand over cash, encouraging the mark to do the same. The con artists will then find some excuse to leave with the mark's money. The valuable might be deposited with a third party such as a bank, or they may leave it in the hands of the mark, who will eventually discover that it is worthless or that the scammers have switched it with a worthless decoy.

The scammers may pretend to visit banks or stores in the course of the con, but they typically avoid actually entering to avoid surveillance cameras, or they may enter a "mock office" that is manufactured solely for the purpose of deceiving the victim and is soon deconstructed after the victim leaves, such that if the victim returns they may find nothing there the next day. They may arrange for the group to park behind such buildings, leaving the mark in the car, and walk around to the front to pretend to go inside.

== Psychology of fraud ==
The con presents the mark with a series of apparent coincidences that successively reinforce the legitimacy of the situation: finding the item, meeting the first and then second scammer, discovering that one of them can "help", and possibly getting the confirmation of a distant and official third party. If the mark believes that any one of these is a random occurrence, it strongly suggests they all are, and it becomes almost impossible to question the sincerity of the scammers. Also, the junior scammer eagerly putting up money establishes trust in a partner willing to take the same risks and confirming belief in the situation. Finally, the mark does not exchange money for nothing, but for an item which is credibly worth far more.

== History ==
Records of this con go back to at least the 18th century, with a number of British legal cases from the 1780s and '90s concerning "ring dropping", where a ring was used as the valuable. However, the con may have a longer history outside of court records, as it was not always treated as a crime in common law countries because the victim hands over money willingly. In 1704, a King's Bench judge acquitted a swindler who stole money by posing as a messenger, deciding that if "one man [makes] a fool of another" it is merely a civil, not criminal, matter. Such fraud only became a crime in Britain later in the 18th century, under a 1757 statute passed by Parliament against "acquisitions by false pretenses", and a judicial precedent of 1795 treating "larceny by trick" as criminal. This contributed to the development of British contract and commercial law amid the increasing significance of commerce in legal culture.

== Cases ==
A variant called the "fawney rig" or "ring drop" dates to at least the 1780s in England, but has continued to crop up around the world as recently as the 2010s. In this scaled-down version of the pigeon drop, a lone con artist pretends to find a ring on the sidewalk in view of the mark, possibly in a purse with a jeweler's receipt proving that it is made of gold, set with real diamonds, etc. They then approach the mark and typically offer to sell it to them for what sounds like an excellent price, saying they lack the time or inclination to find a more suitable dealer. If the mark takes the bait, they will discover that the ring is made of cheap brass, its jewels if any are fake, and any notes accompanying it are forged, and that they have in fact paid far more than its true value. The word "fawney" comes from the Irish fáinne (ring), and is likely the source of the modern word "phoney".

Late 1980s New York City saw a version of this scam known as the "Spanish Lotto", where scammers would prey on Hispanic marks using a supposed winning lottery ticket. The first scammer would approach the mark with the ticket and pretend to be an illegal immigrant whose legal status and minimal English skills made him unable to cash it, saying he was seeking a Spanish-speaking lawyer for help. The accomplice would pose as such a lawyer, wearing formal clothes, who happened to be walking past. The "lawyer" would go to a pay phone and call a third scammer posing as a lottery official. The "official" would confirm that the ticket was winning, but say that if the bearer was not an American citizen, they could only cash in the ticket if two citizens accompanied them and showed sufficient cash to prove that they had no reason to rob the bearer. The "immigrant" would offer both the "lawyer" and the mark large rewards from their ticket winnings if they would help them collect. After having the "lawyer" and mark pool cash in an envelope, the "immigrant" would hand the ticket and envelope to the mark for safe keeping, and then find an excuse to leave temporarily with the "lawyer", and escape. The mark would find that the ticket was worthless and the envelope had been switched for one filled with worthless paper. NYC police estimated in 1991 that there were over a dozen teams plying this scam in the city. In the late 2010s, this version of the con was still appearing as far afield as Illinois.

There was a rash of scams in the early-mid 2010s in Charleston, South Carolina; each would begin with a con artist approaching an elderly mark in the parking lot of a bank holding an unmarked bag filled with apparent money. They would ask the mark if they had dropped the bag, and an accomplice would then walk by whom they would ask the same question. In time the con artists would suggest that the group might as well split the money three ways, but would come up with some reason why everyone needed to put up their own money first, such as to prove good faith or to check that the bag money was not counterfeit. The con artists would pool everyone's money in the bag, then find a way to flee, sometimes leaving the mark unwittingly holding a bag of newspaper in its place.

== In popular culture ==
The Sting, the 1974 Oscar winner for Best Picture, begins when two conmen (Robert Redford and Robert Earl Jones) run the pigeon drop on a mark, only to discover later that the mark was a bagman for an organized crime boss. Jones' character is murdered by the mob in revenge, setting the dramatic tension for the film.

In 1983, Season 10 of The Jeffersons began with a three-episode arc about a pigeon drop scam.

The 1987 film House of Games contains a pigeon drop in the second act.

In The Golden Girls season 5, episode 22, "Cheaters", broadcast March 24, 1990, Blanche and Sophia are victims of a pigeon drop scam. A man approaches them in a shopping mall asking them if they dropped a wallet he just found with a lot of money in it. He persuades them (with the help of what appears to be another random person in the mall) to contribute $2,000 of their own money to open a joint bank account where they will keep the found money and eventually split it if it remains unclaimed by the owner. When Sophia later explains to Rose how she and Blanche were scammed out of the $2,000, Rose tells her, "You two were victims of the oldest confidence game going: the pigeon drop."

The 2003 film Matchstick Men opens with two of the main characters performing a pigeon drop, posing as IRS agents.

The 2015 Better Call Saul episode "Hero" features a scene where Jimmy McGill and his friend, Marco Pasternak, use a pigeon drop to scam a mark out of a wallet. Jimmy leaves a bar with a new acquaintance, Stevie. In an alley, they discover a barely conscious drunk man next to a wallet full of cash. Stevie takes the cash and Jimmy takes the man's Rolex watch. Jimmy estimates the Rolex to be worth more than the wallet, leading Stevie to trade the found money plus additional cash of his own for the watch. After Stevie runs away with the watch, a cheap counterfeit, Jimmy and the "unconscious" man, now revealed to be his partner, return to Jimmy's residence to split the proceeds of their scam.

== See also ==
- Advance-fee scam
