= World Luxury Association =

The World Luxury Association (Chinese: 世界奢侈品协会) is a self-proclaimed "international organisation" that conducts various activities relating to luxury goods.

== Activities ==
On its official website, it claims to be a "U.S. government International Non-profit Organisation". Another website claimed to be run by this organisation, the "World's Most Valuable Top100 Luxury Brand Official Release Ceremony" website, claims that the organisation was "signed" by a "former Secretary of State of the U.S. Government" to "regulate the international luxury market". It also claims to have "more than 700 countries" [sic] around the world.

All of the association's reported activities are conducted in the People's Republic of China, where it has a high media profile. These activities are usually conducted in the name of its claimed Chinese representative office. The public face of this association is Ouyang Kun (Chinese: 欧阳坤), a former acting student also known as Mao Ouyang Kun and Mao Shaokun, who is claimed to be the chief executive officer of the Chinese representative office of this association. The association conducts high profile activities in China which are frequently reported in the mainstream media. These activities include offering "official registration" to owners of their brands as "official luxury brands", "launches" of "official lists" of top luxury brands, the release of "official reports" into the luxury market in China, and meetings with government officials. The association is frequently quoted by the mainstream news media in relation to the luxury market in China and globally.

The discrepancy between the organisation's claimed official provenance and worldwide activities on the one hand, and the Chinglish employed on its English language websites and its activities being restricted to China on the other hand, has roused suspicion. In 2013, China's China Central Television ran an exposé program in which it was claimed that the World Luxury Association is a scam. However, the "CEO" Ouyang Kun returned to the front pages in September 2013 when he claimed that "Huazong", a Chinese internet personality who had previously accused Ouyang Kun and the World Luxury Association of being a scam, has been arrested, and that he has been to the police station "as the victim" to identify "Huazong"; "Huazong"'s other claim to fame is that he exposed a number of corrupt officials by identifying their luxury watches from official photographs. Commentators in China have expressed fears that the arrest is politically motivated.
