= Green goods scam =

Fraud scheme involving counterfeit money

The green goods scam, also known as the "green goods game", was a fraud scheme popular in the 19th-century United States in which people were duped into paying for worthless counterfeit money. It is a variation on the pig-in-a-poke scam using money instead of other goods like a pig.

In the typical green goods scam, the mark, or victim, would respond to flyers circulated throughout the country by the scammers ("green goods men") which claimed to offer "genuine" counterfeit currency for sale. This currency was sometimes alleged to have been printed with stolen engraving plates. Victims, usually living outside major cities, would be enticed to travel to the location of the green goods men to complete the transaction. Victims were guided by a "steerer" to be shown large amounts of genuine currency – represented to be counterfeit – which was then placed in a bag or satchel. Victims then received offers to purchase the money at a price much less than face value. While a victim negotiated a price or was otherwise distracted, another accomplice (the "ringer") would switch the bag of money for a bag containing sawdust, green paper, or other worthless items. Victims would leave unaware of the switch, and were unwilling to report the crime, as attempting to purchase counterfeit currency was itself a crime and the victim risked arrest.

== See also ==
- Black money scam
- 419 scam
- George Appo
- Confidence tricks
- Victor Lustig

== Bibliography ==
- Timothy J. Gilfolyle, A Pickpocket's Tale: The Underworld of Nineteenth-Century New York (2006).
- "Alas, Poor Innocent, An Old Trick at the Green Goods Game". The New York Times. November 27, 1887.
