= Lipstick on a pig =

Idiom

The idiom "to put lipstick on a pig" means making superficial or cosmetic changes to something in a futile effort to disguise its fundamental failings. There are many phrases using pigs or swine, dating back to ancient times. This phrase seems to have been coined in the 20th century.

Phrases analogous to "lipstick on a pig" have been used for centuries in various forms, including "you can't make a silk purse from a sow's ear." The use of "lipstick on a pig" in its current form dates back to at least 1926, but it gained widespread use in political rhetoric during the 2008 United States presidential election, where it was used to criticize spin and to imply that an opponent (beginning with Sarah Palin) was attempting to repackage established policies and present them as new. It has since been used in political discourse in various countries, sometimes causing controversy.

== Etymology ==
Pigs have long been featured in proverbial expressions: a "pig's ear", a "pig in a poke", as well as the Biblical expressions "pearls before swine" and "ring of gold in a swine's snout". Whereas the phrase "lipstick on a pig" seems to have been coined in the 20th century, the concept of the phrase may not be particularly recent. The similar expression, "You can't make a silk purse from a sow's ear" seems to have been in use by the middle of the 16th century or earlier. English writer Thomas Fuller noted the use of the phrase "A hog in armour is still but a hog" in 1732, with the 1796 Classical Dictionary of the Vulgar Tongue noting that "hog in armour" alluded to "an awkward or mean-looking man or woman, finely dressed." The Baptist preacher Charles Spurgeon (1834–1892) recorded the variation "A hog in a silk waistcoat is still a hog" in his book of proverbs The Salt-Cellars (published 1887).

The "lipstick" variant of the phrase is more modern (the word "lipstick" itself was only coined in 1880). The rhetorical effect of linking pigs with lipstick was explored in 1926 by Charles F. Lummis, in the Los Angeles Times, when he wrote "Most of us know as much of history as a pig does of lipsticks." However, the first recorded uses of "putting lipstick on a pig" are later. In Stella Gibbons' Westwood (published in 1946) Hebe visits a hair salon and has her hair "contemptuously washed by Miss Susan, who had a face like a very young pig that had managed to get hold of a lipstick".

In an article in the Quad-City Herald (Brewster, Washington) from 31 January 1980, it was observed that "You can clean up a pig, put a ribbon on it's [sic] tail, spray it with perfume, but it is still a pig." The phrase was also reported in 1985 when The Washington Post quoted a San Francisco radio host from KNBR remarking "That would be like putting lipstick on a pig" in reference to plans to refurbish Candlestick Park (rather than constructing a new stadium for the San Francisco Giants).

In a 1983 article, "Sugar Loaf Key: Tales of the Swine Family", Hunter S. Thompson describes a prank in which he put lipstick on the head of a pig and put it in the toilet of a Florida resort owner.

In the summer of 1992 at the Democratic National Convention, Texas governor Ann Richards said "Well, you can put lipstick on a hog and call it Monique, but it's still a pig." This was in reference to a plan by president George H.W. Bush to use US warships to protect oil tankers in the Middle East. Richards thought the program was wasteful spending.

== 21st-century usage ==
In May 2002, brokerage firm Charles Schwab Corporation ran a television advertisement pointing out Wall Street brokerage firms' conflicts of interest by showing an unidentified sales manager telling his salesmen, "Let's put some lipstick on this pig!" The ad appeared shortly after New York Attorney General Eliot Spitzer announced that Merrill Lynch stock analysts had recommended stocks that they privately called "dogs". CBS refused to air the ad.

The phrase was then used in political rhetoric to criticize spin, and to insinuate that a political opponent is attempting to repackage established policies and present them as new. Victoria Clarke, who was Assistant Secretary of Defense for Public Affairs under Donald Rumsfeld, published a book about spin in politics titled Lipstick on a Pig: Winning In the No-Spin Era by Someone Who Knows the Game. The book argued, using anecdotes from her own career, that spin does not work in an age of transparency, when everyone will find out the truth anyway ("you can put lipstick on a pig, but it is still a pig").

By 2008, the phrase had become a common and often controversial political invective in the United Kingdom and the United States. It was used by many US politicians, including the Democratic nominee Barack Obama and Republican nominee John McCain during the 2008 United States presidential election, and former Vice President Dick Cheney (who called it his "favorite line").

In 2017 in New Zealand, the phrase became controversial when Opportunities Party leader Gareth Morgan used it in a way that was interpreted by journalists as an insult to Labour Party leader Jacinda Ardern. Morgan said it was intended to describe Ardern's assumption of the Labour leadership as possibly a "superficial makeover" for the party.

=== Book titles ===
- Lipstick on a Pig by Dennis A. Smith, Writing the Wrong Ltd, 2008, 2010, 2020 (ISBN 978-0-9582896-9-6)
- Lipstick on a Pig: Winning In the No-Spin Era by Someone Who Knows the Game, Victoria Clarke, Free Press, 2006 (ISBN 0743271165)
- Putting Lipstick on a Pig (Rep and Melissa Pennyworth Mysteries), Michael Bowen, Poisoned Pen Press, 2008 (ISBN 1590585313)
- If You Put Lipstick on a Pig – You Will Have A Beautiful Pig, Penelope Dyan, Bellissima Publishing LLC, 2008 (ISBN 1935118269)
- Let's Put Some Lipstick on This Pig? Practical and Innovative Insights for the Selling Professional, Mark McGlinchey, Business Management Solutions, 2003 (ISBN 0972807608)
- Election 2008: Lipstick on the Pig (Substance of Governance; Legitimate Grievances; Candidates on the Issues; Balanced Budget 101; Call to Arms: Fund We Not Them; Annotated Bibliography), Robert David Steele Vivas, Earth Intelligence Network, 2008, (ISBN 0971566151)

== International variants ==
- Dutch: "Al geef je een aap een gouden ring, het is en blijft een lelijk ding." (English: "Even if you give a monkey a golden ring, it remains an ugly thing.")

== See also ==
- Cultural references to pigs
- English-language idioms
