= Coin-matching game =

Confidence trick in which two con artists set up one victim

A coin-matching game (also a coin smack or smack game) is a confidence trick in which two con artists set up one victim.

The first con artist strikes up a conversation with the victim, usually while waiting somewhere. The con artist suggests playing a game of matching pennies (or other coins) to pass the time, a simple game where players reveal coins as heads or tails and the winner is determined by whether the faces match or differ. The second con artist arrives and joins in, but soon leaves for a moment. The first con artist then suggests cheating. The victim, thinking they are going to scam the second con artist, agrees to match coins each time.

When the second con artist returns and begins losing, he accuses the two of cheating and threatens to call the police. The first con artist offers a sizable sum of hush money, and the victim contributes something too. After the victim leaves, the two con artists split up the money extorted from the victim.

In game theory the term refers to a zero-sum two-person game of imperfect information (not involving a third player or collusion); other variations on the name are "matching coins" or "matching pennies".
