= Pig in a poke =

Item purchased without inspection

A pig in a poke is a thing that is bought without first being inspected, and thus of unknown authenticity or quality. The idiom is attested in 1555:

I wyll neuer bye the pyg in the poke
Thers many a foule pyg in a feyre cloke

Translation:

I will never buy the pig in the poke
There's many a foul pig in a fair cloak

A "poke" is a sack, so the image is of a concealed item being sold.

Starting in the 19th century, this idiom was explained as a confidence trick where a farmer would substitute a cat for a suckling pig when bringing it to market. When the buyer discovered the deception, he was said to "let the cat out of the bag", that is, to learn of something unfortunate prematurely, hence the expression "letting the cat out of the bag", meaning to reveal that which is secret. The French idiom acheter (un) chat en poche and the Dutch een kat in de zak kopen and also the German die Katze im Sack kaufen (all: to buy a cat in a bag) refer to an actual scam of this nature, as do many other European equivalents, while the English expression refers to the appearance of the trick. The English idiom "sold a pup" refers to a similar con. Other variations include "buy a fish in water" (Arabic), "buy a cow on another mountain" (Chinese), "buy in a closed box" (Italian) and "buy a cat instead of a hare" (Iberian languages).

In common law, buyers have the right to inspect goods before purchase.

== Etymology ==
A poke is a sack or bag, from French poque, which is also the etymon of "pocket", "pouch", and "poach". Poke is still in regional use. Pigs were formerly brought to market for sale in a cloth bag, a poke.

== Use in popular culture ==
In the April 1929 edition of the literary magazine The London Aphrodite, a story by Rhys Davies, titled "A Pig in a Poke", was published, in which a Welsh coal miner takes a woman from London for his wife and regrets it.

In the 1985 film National Lampoon's European Vacation, the Griswold family wins the vacation on a game show called "Pig in a Poke".

In the 1986 book Cadillac Desert: The American West and Its Disappearing Water by Marc Reisner, the author writes about a dubious water project on page 432. "The Bureau wasn't even offering the farmers a pig in a poke; it was offering them a poke without a pig."

== See also ==
- Cultural references to pigs
- Green goods scam
- Lipstick on a pig
- Impulse purchase

== Bibliography ==
- E. Cobham Brewer, Dictionary of Phrase and Fable. 1898.
- Funk, Charles Earle, A Hog on Ice: & Other Curious Expressions. HarperResource, 2002. ISBN 0-06-051329-2.
