= Sick baby hoax =

Confidence trick

A sick baby hoax is a confidence trick where a person claims, often on a website, that they have an ill child (or sometimes a pet) and are struggling to pay for their medical expenses. Some versions of the hoax ask people to make a monetary donation directly, while others simply encourage people to share the story.

== Taking advantage of people's compassion towards children ==
Professional beggars have been exploiting sick children since ancient times. The success of such scams relies on a particular compassion in people towards children. When a child is sick, this particularly touches people's hearts. An early example of this kind of hoax online is the "sick child chain letter", an email making the claim that "with every name that this [letter] is sent to, the American Cancer Society will donate 3 cents per name to her treatment".

== Spread through social media ==
Social media, such as Facebook, facilitate the following form of this scam. A photo of a sick child is posted online, commonly without knowledge of the relatives, accompanied by a heart-touching story and sometimes a request for donations, which are simply collected by the scammer. Often these photos become viral, so it becomes close to impossible to take them down. Since Facebook has been slow to address the problem efficiently (relying on user takedown requests and reports only), several scam- and hoax-combatting websites have worked together to raise the awareness of social media providers regarding this issue.

== See also ==
- Munchausen syndrome by proxy
