= Gary J. Aguirre =

American lawyer

- Education: University of California, Berkeley (B.S.); UC Berkeley, School of Law; (LL.B.); UC Los Angeles (M.F.A.); Georgetown University Law Center (LL.M.)
- Occupation: Lawyer
- Years active: 1967–present
- Employer: The Aguirre Law Firm
- Website: aguirrelawapc.com

Gary J. Aguirre is an American lawyer, former investigator with the United States Securities and Exchange Commission (SEC) and whistleblower.

After working in a law firm briefly, he became a public defender, then worked as a trial lawyer in California. Having reached his professional and financial goals, he took an extended break in 1995. In 2000, he decided to go into public service and went back to law school, focusing on international and securities law.

After earning his second law degree, he applied for a job with the SEC, where he became the lead investigator on an insider trading case involving Pequot Capital Management. Suspecting the leaked information came from John J. Mack, a Wall Street titan and major contributor to the 2004 campaign of President George W. Bush, Aguirre wanted to subpoena Mack, but supervisors told him Mack had too much "political clout" and would not be pursued. Aguirre complained to a superior about the preferential treatment being given to Mack and was fired without warning. A Senate investigation later found his termination to have been an illegal reprisal.

In May 2010, Pequot Capital settled its insider trading charges with the SEC for $28 million and a month later, the SEC settled the wrongful termination suit filed by Aguirre for $5,000. Aguirre returned to private practice in San Diego in 2008, specializing in securities law. He has emerged as a major critic of the SEC, calling it an agency that was set up to protect the public from Wall Street, but now protects Wall Street from the public. He represents Darcy Flynn, also an SEC whistleblower, who in summer 2011 was interviewed by staff from three congressional committees. He said that the SEC had destroyed thousands of records of preliminary investigations and that SEC investigators trying to pursue a case against Deutsche Bank were thwarted by Richard H. Walker, then SEC director of enforcement, who shortly thereafter, took a job at Deutsche Bank as general counsel. He also represents Rodolfo Michelon, a whistleblower, a former comptroller at Sempra Global, who claims Sempra paid kickbacks to Mexican government officials and has filed a suit against the SEC alleging the SEC "outsourced" its investigation of Sempra to a law firm with ties to Sempra, in effect subverting the law.

== Enters private practice ==
Aguirre is a lawyer in San Diego, California. He was admitted to the State Bar of California on December 23, 1966. He became an associate at Brobeck, Phleger & Harrison, then one of San Francisco's largest firms. In his spare time, worked on Robert F. Kennedy's presidential campaign. On May 28, 1968, Kennedy sent him a letter that spoke of the special role lawyers played in bringing about orderly change to the nation. Just eight days after sending the letter, Kennedy was assassinated.

After a year, Aguirre left Brobeck to become a public defender in Fresno County, where he found both the trial experience and public service he was seeking. Later moving back to private practice in San Diego, he made a name for himself by proving that Pacific Southwest Airlines (PSA) was liable for a mid-air plane crash over San Diego in 1978, then the worst aviation disaster in U.S. airspace. In the 1980s, Aguirre pioneered construction-defect litigation, a branch of class-action law previously considered by San Diego lawyers to be too difficult for plaintiffs to win. In 1983, San Diego Magazine called him "a legal fireball" for his case proving PSA's liability and for his case against the Manville Corporation, which had national importance.

Arguing on behalf of homeowners in construction-defect cases, by 1994, Aguirre and his partner had won 94 consecutive cases, recovering over $200 million for the plaintiffs. Aguirre has received three "Outstanding Trial Lawyer" awards from the San Diego Trial Lawyers Association.

=== Manville ===
In the early 1970s, Manville Corporation, a Dow Jones company sold a stucco-like product for use on exterior walls. Within a short time, the product was found to be defective and deteriorate rapidly, causing significant damage to homes and buildings. Manville pulled the product off the market in 1974, just four years after it was introduced.

In the course of preparing his case, Aguirre began monitoring Manville in October 1981, when the company undertook a reorganization that moved 75% of its assets to four of five new companies it created. The board of directors and officers remained in the same positions, so nothing essential changed; except the assets were diverted. Aguirre became convinced Manville was trying to put its assets beyond the reach of unsecured creditors and when he went to trial, he accurately predicted the company would file between 45 and 60 days.

The three-month-long trial concluded with Aguirre winning a $6 million award against Manville, at that time, the largest amount in San Diego Superior Court history. The amount was later increased to $7.5 million when delay damages were added. On July 2, 1982, the day after winning his lawsuit against Manville, Aguirre went back to court to ask that Manville be required to post a $9 million bond to guarantee his clients' judgment in case of a bankruptcy filing, arguing that Manville was on the verge of filing a Chapter 11 bankruptcy. (Note: At the beginning of the trial in March, Aguirre predicted Manville would declare bankruptcy in 45 to 60 days and asked the judge then to guarantee his clients' judgment. The request was denied because at the time, Manville seemed financially sound with $2.2 billion in assets; also, no Dow Jones company had ever declared bankruptcy. (See Raymond A. Joseph, "Rescon Walls Cause Trouble for Manville", The Wall Street Journal, December 28, 1982; and Michael A. Hiltzik, "A Hunch Could Pay Off in Manville Case", Los Angeles Times, December 15, 1982.)) Agreeing with Aguirre's argument, the judge ordered Manville to post a bond.

Eight weeks later, on August 26, 1982, Manville did file for Chapter 11 protection from multiple damage awards, shocking financial analysts. Unlike the more than 12,000 other plaintiffs, primarily asbestos cases, Aguirre's clients' judgment was insured by a $9 million bond. All lawsuits against Manville were immediately stayed, but a federal bankruptcy judge in New York separated Aguirre's case from the others, paving the way for Aguirre's clients to receive their payments. The thousands of other lawsuits remained frozen until May 1988.

== SEC investigator, becomes whistleblower ==
In July 2004, Aguirre entered public service as a senior counsel at the SEC Division of Enforcement in Washington, D.C. A routine check of Wall Street trades flagged unusually heavy stock purchases by Pequot Capital Management, a hedge fund, in Heller Financial in July 2001, which was bought by GE Capital shortly thereafter, earning Pequot $18 million inside of a month. Aguirre was made the lead investigator on the case.

First of all, the profit on it was $18 million in one month and it was handled solely by the CEO of the hedge fund [Arthur Samberg] without collaboration by anybody else. In fact, their internal regulations about how you were supposed to make these kinds of decisions—talk to other people, visit the company—none of these things was done. There were no e-mails, there were no reports, there was no research, no contact with any companies, no contact with third parties. There was just nothing. One day this guy [Samberg] just says, 'Heller Financial!' As it says in the Senate report, Samberg's orders were sometimes for twice as much stock as sold on that day. So if you're selling 200,000 shares that day, he wanted to buy 400,000. Well, how come you're buying all of this if you've never done any research, you haven't talked to these guys, you don't follow the stock? There was no rational explanation why this guy bought more stock than anybody else in the country during these 30 days. So then we began to backtrack—who did he talk to immediately before he bought it that could've known anything about this stock? Well, of course, there was only one person, and that was John Mack.

— Gary J. Aguirre, San Diego Magazine

Aguirre pushed to subpoena John Mack, a top Wall Street executive who was then under consideration by Morgan Stanley to become its CEO and had been a major contributor to the 2004 presidential campaign of George W. Bush. Initially, Aguirre had the full support of other SEC staff and of his supervisors. This changed on June 23, 2005, when Aguirre received a phone call from Eric Dinallo, head of regulatory compliance at Morgan Stanley, who wanted to know if the SEC was "going to proceed against Mack" because of concerns revolving around Morgan Stanley's decision to hire Mack as CEO. The same day, Aguirre's supervisor, Robert Hanson, told him it would be an uphill battle to pursue Mack because of Mack's "powerful political connections".

=== Investigation derailed ===
Just three days after the call to Aguirre, Mary Jo White placed a call to Linda Chatman Thomsen. Thomsen was then SEC Director of Enforcement and Aguirre's boss four levels above him. White is a partner at Debevoise & Plimpton, the law firm hired by Morgan Stanley to vet Mack and was in charge of the process She had previously been the U.S. Attorney for the Southern District of New York which has jurisdiction over Wall Street. Though Thomsen told the Senate she told White she couldn't say anything about the Mack investigation, the Senate report said White's talking points indicated Thomsen had said there was "smoke" but "surely not fire".

Over the next two days, Aguirre sent his supervisors his analysis of the evidence against Pequot and proposed interviewing Mack. On June 28, he had a "heated discussion" with Mark Kreitman, one of his supervisors and his former professor at Georgetown, over the SEC's refusal to interview Mack. In the meantime, he was given his year-end performance evaluation, which noted his dedication. Hanson wrote, "[Aguirre] has consistently gone the extra mile, and then some," and a two-step salary increase was approved.

A month later, on July 27, 2005, Aguirre sent an e-mail to his supervisor Paul R. Berger, explaining the importance of the Mack subpoena and expressing concern that "treating Mack differently is [not] consistent with the Commission's mission, which is "to protect investors, maintain fair, orderly, and efficient markets, and facilitate capital formation." In this e-mail, Aguirre also reported to Berger that Hanson had said Mack had "political connections".

=== Retaliation ===
After Aguirre raised concerns about the special treatment being given Mack, Berger told Hanson to do a "supplemental evaluation" of Aguirre and one other staff attorney "looking to raise trouble". The Senate report notes that such re-evaluations were not an authorized part of the SEC evaluation process, nor were SEC officials able to recall other instances where "supplemental evaluations" were drafted for other employees. Aguirre continued to have conversations with Hanson about Mack in the early days of August. Hanson continued to refer to Mack's political connections and on August 4, 2005 wrote, "Mack's counsel will have 'juice' as I described last night—meaning that they may reach out to Paul and Linda (and possibly others)." Apparently setting a precedent, Aguirre's supervisors re-evaluated his job performance, reversing the positive appraisal given just one month prior. While on vacation, Aguirre was abruptly fired without warning on September 1, 2005. His termination was later found to have been unlawful by the subsequent Senate investigations and report.

Berger stopped the investigation of Mack and closed the case against Pequot without filing a single charge. A few months prior, on January 31, 2005, Berger had gotten an e-mail from Jan Lower, another attorney, describing in detail the $2 million potential earnings an SEC official could earn at Debevoise. On September 8, 2005, just days after Aguirre was fired, an SEC official at the same staff level as Berger wrote an e-mail to him titled "Debevoise", saying he had mentioned Berger's "interest" to White and within weeks, it was rumored that Berger would be leaving the SEC to join Debevoise & Plimpton as a partner. Berger submitted his resignation to the SEC on May 15, 2006 and on June 1, 2006 became a partner at Debevoise & Plimpton, where he continues to work. White denies asking the SEC to close any investigation.

=== Vindication by the Senate ===
Aguirre wrote an 18-page letter to members of the U.S. Senate who were chairmen of various related committees and subcommittees, detailing his allegations about Pequot. Senators Charles E. Grassley and Richard C. Shelby, both Republicans, asked SEC officials for a confidential briefing on the matter. Aguirre accused the SEC of failing to pursue Mack because of his political connections as a major fundraiser for George W. Bush. By 2006, both the Senate Finance Committee and the Senate Judiciary Committee were investigating the matter, culminating in what Forbes magazine called a "scathing" report. In testimony, Aguirre told the committee there needed to be better regulation of hedge funds to protect the public. He said, "There is growing evidence that today's unregulated hedge funds have advanced and refined the practice of manipulating and cheating other market participants. The potential harm hedge funds can inflict on other market participants has no real limits." He warned that fixing the SEC so it would protect investors and capital markets would not be easy because powerful Wall Street investment banks liked things as they are He said the SEC and the Justice Department had failed to adequately prosecute abuses by hedge funds, and he compared the situation to that which preceded the stock market crash of 1929.

In the Senate's oversight role, it conducted an extensive investigation of whether or not Mack received unlawful preferential treatment from the SEC and whether or not Aguirre was unlawfully fired as a result of objecting to this treatment. The Senate reviewed 10,000 pages of documents and held more than 30 witness interviews. Additionally, there were three hearings before the Senate Judiciary Committee in June, September and December 2006. The joint report was officially released August 3, 2007. The Senate found Aguirre to have been well regarded until he questioned the SEC's misconduct toward Mack, that Mack was treated preferentially and that Aguirre was illegally fired in retaliation.

=== Court vindication and settlement ===
Aguirre then sued the SEC under the Freedom of Information Act (FOIA) seeking documents related to his employment and discharge, as well as the SEC's investigation of Pequot and Mack. The SEC, claiming several exemptions under the law released redacted versions of the documents, thereby withholding information. They also failed to produce Aguirre's original personnel file. Aguirre alleged in his suit that the SEC had failed to conduct an adequate search for documents and he challenged the SEC's failure to produce his original personnel file, which contained records missing from the version given him. On April 28, 2008, the United States District Court for the District of Columbia, citing the Senate report extensively, ruled in his favor, forcing the SEC to turn over documents to Aguirre. The Court wrote of "the importance of understanding the dispute between the parties, as well as plaintiff's legal argument that the public interest in disclosure of the withheld records outweighs any privacy interest" under exemptions claimed by the SEC and relied heavily on the Senate report. It noted how the SEC resisted deposing Mack and didn't considering him a potential tipper until after a front-page article in The New York Times revealed the derailed investigation and then did not depose him until the statute of limitations for civil and criminal penalties had run out. (Note: The district court wrote, "The evidentiary standard is easily met in this case. The Senate Report uncovered several potential improprieties by SEC staff. First, the Committees determined that SEC officials were "overly deferential" to John Mack because of his prominence. (S. Rep. 37.) When the SEC accords special treatment to prominent figures, it "undermines public confidence [in] the integrity of its investigations and exacerbates the problems associated with 'regulatory capture.'" (Id.)(internal citations omitted). Second, the Committee found credible evidence suggesting that the SEC retaliated against plaintiff for his efforts to examine John Mack. SEC management conducted a suspicious "re-evaluation" of plaintiff, even though his regular evaluation had just been completed a month earlier, and according to the Senate Report, the re-evaluation "appears both improper and retaliatory," and the negative comments were "unsupported." (Id. 74.) The Committees concluded that plaintiff's firing was "intricately connected" to his efforts to examine John Mack. (S. Rep. 78.)" Gary Aguirre v. Securities and Exchange Commission, Civil Action No. 06-1260 (ESH) p.35)

It's a shame the team I worked with at the SEC did not get to complete the Pequot investigation. The filing of the case in 2005 or 2006, before the 2008 financial crisis, would have been the right message at the right moment for Wall Street elite: the SEC goes after big fish too.

— Gary J. Aguirre

In 2007, Senators Chuck Grassley and Arlen Specter urged the SEC to reopen the case against Pequot, but it remained closed. Making extensive use of the documents released by the SEC to him, Aguirre uncovered incriminating evidence proving Pequot had engaged in insider trading of Microsoft and he shared this evidence with the SEC in a 16-page letter to SEC chairman Christopher Cox, dated January 2, 2009. Within days, the SEC re-opened the investigation, but no charges were filed in the weeks or months following, though when it did finally file charges, they closely followed the evidence as stated in Aguirre's letter.

On April 1, 2009, Aguirre filed a second lawsuit against the SEC for unlawful disclosure of his records under the Privacy Act of 1974, for violating the due process clause of the Fifth Amendment and for injunctive relief under the Privacy Act and FOIA. On December 2, 2009, in an interim decision on Aguirre's FOIA case, the Court again ruled in his favor. On May 26, 2010, Aguirre filed papers in this case, seeking an order directing the SEC to release additional Pequot records to him on the grounds that under the FOIA, the SEC had to turn the records over to him because it had filed no case against Pequot or anyone else. Early the next morning, on May 27, 2010, the SEC filed charges against Pequot, Samberg and Zilkha and announced a settlement with Pequot.

A month later, the SEC agreed to pay Aguirre $5,000, an amount equal to four years and ten months of lost salary and attorney's fees. (Note: The SEC nearly settled with Aguirre in May 2009, but just as both sides appeared on the verge of agreeing to the details and amount of the settlement, in an e-mail dated two hours after a Forbes article was published which quoted Aguirre criticizing the SEC, the SEC's deputy general counsel, Mark Cahn, wrote, "After careful consideration, we cannot agree to your proposed terms." (See "Whistle-Blower Claims New Retaliation By SEC". Forbes magazine, June 2, 2009.)) The amount appears to be the largest settlement ever disclosed by the Merit Systems Protection Board. On reaching the settlement with the SEC for his wrongful termination, Aguirre said, "It's a shame the team I worked with at the SEC did not get to complete the Pequot investigation. The filing of the case in 2005 or 2006, before the financial crisis, would have been the right message at the right moment for Wall Street elite: the SEC goes after big fish too."

Gary J. Aguirre Investigation Timeline

Individual	Company	Position	Date	Topic	Quote	Notes
John Mack	Morgan Stanley	CEO	June 26, 2001	John Mack	John Mack, in Switzerland, talks to one of Heller Financial's advisers, Credit Suisse	
John Mack	Morgan Stanley	CEO	June 29, 2001	John Mack	John Mack calls Arthur Samberg after the markets close	
Arthur J. Samberg	Pequot		July 2001	John Mack	Between July 2 and 27, Pequot, under CEO Arthur Samberg's direction, makes unusually heavy stock purchases of Heller Financial, buying more Heller stock than anyone else during the 30 days before the announcement of Heller Financial's acquisition	
John Mack	Morgan Stanley		July 30, 2001	John Mack	G.E.'s acquisition of Heller Financial is announced. Pequot makes $18 million	
Gary Aguirre	SEC	Staff Attorney	June 20, 2005	John Mack	SEC Staff Attorney Gary Aguirre tries to subpoena Morgan Stanley CEO John Mack	
Eric Dinallo	Morgan Stanley		June 23, 2005	John Mack	Morgan Stanley's Eric Dinallo contacts the SEC for information about John Mack's exposure in the Pequot investigation	
Robert Hanson	SEC	Branch Chief	June 23, 2005	John Mack	SEC Staff Attorney Gary Aguirre's supervisor Robert Hanson warns Aguirre that it would be difficult to obtain approval to subpoena John Mack because of Mack's "very powerful political connections," and that John Mack's counsel would have "juice"	
Gary Aguirre	SEC	Staff Attorney	August 4, 2005	John Mack	SEC Staff Attorney Gary Aguirre is told to take his vacation, and that whether or not to subpoena Mack will be decided in September	
Gary Aguirre			September 1, 2005	Fired	SEC Staff Attorney Gary Aguirre is fired from the SEC while on vacation	
Gary Aguirre			September 2, 2005	SEC	Gary Aguirre sends a letter to SEC Chairman Christopher Cox	
Paul Berger	SEC	Associate Director	September 2005		SEC Associate Director Paul Berger inquires about a job with Debevoise & Plimpton	
SEC			December 15, 2005	Gary Aguirre	The SEC threatens criminal charges against Aguirre if he provides incriminating records to the OSC	
Gary Aguirre			May 30, 2006	SEC	Gary Aguirre sends a letter to U.S. Senate Banking Committee telling how Mack investigation was halted	
Paul Berger	SEC	Associate Director	May 31, 2006	Leaves SEC	SEC Associate Director Paul Berger leaves the SEC	
Paul Berger	Debevoise & Plimpton		June 2, 2006	Joins law firm	Former SEC Associate Director Paul Berger joins Debevoise & Plimpton	
Gary Aguirre			June 28, 2006	SEC	Gary Aguirre testifies before the U.S. Senate Judiciary Committee	
Linda Thomsen	SEC	Enforcement Director	August 1, 2006	John Mack	SEC management delays Mack's testimony for over a year, until days after the statute of limitations expires	
US Senate			September 2006	Gary Aguirre	The Senate writes two letters pressing the General Accounting Office to conduct a formal investigation into Aguirre's allegations of regulatory capture	
Floyd Norris	New York Times		December 5, 2006	Gary Aguirre	New York Times reporter Floyd Norris writes a story dismissive of Mr. Aguirre's allegations	
Linda Thomsen	SEC	Enforcement Director	December 5, 2006	Gary Aguirre	SEC issues statement denying Aguirre's claims	
Linda Thomsen	SEC	Enforcement Director	December 5, 2006	Gary Aguirre	Linda Thomsen, her subordinates, and SEC Inspector General testify before the Senate Judiciary Committee	
Gary Aguirre			December 5, 2006	SEC	Gary Aguirre testifies at U.S. Senate Judiciary Committee	
Wall Street Journal			December 2006	Gary Aguirre	The Wall Street Journal downplays Aguirre's testimony	
US Senate			January 31, 2007	Gary Aguirre	The Senate releases a preliminary report on the US Senate hearing with Gary Aguirre's testimony	
US Senate			January 31, 2007	Gary Aguirre	On the Senate floor, Arlen Specter stated the judiciary panel's preliminary findings show "extraordinarily lax enforcement by the SEC, and ... may even indicate a cover-up by the SEC."	
US Senate			April 2007	Gary Aguirre	Aguirre's allegations are examined in a PBS news story	
Gary Aguirre			August 3, 2007		The full U.S. Senate report including the Aguirre testimony is released	
Walter Stachnik	SEC	Inspector General	August 3, 2007	Walter Stachnik	SEC Inspector General Walter Stachnik resigns	
Roel Campos	SEC	Commissioner	August 9, 2007	Roel Campos	SEC Commissioner Roel Campos resigns	
Floyd Norris	New York Times		August 10, 2007		After Aguirre is vindicated, Floyd Norris justifies himself in his New York Times blog and asked, "And what, precisely did I write about Aguirre that was wrong?"	
Annette Nazareth	SEC	Commissioner	January 2008	Leaves SEC	SEC Commissioner Annette Nazareth leaves the SEC	
Annette Nazareth	Davis Polk	Partner	September 22, 2008	Joins law firm	Former SEC Commissioner Annette Nazareth joins Davis Polk & Wardell	
Linda Thomsen	SEC	Enforcement Director	February 27, 2009	Leaves SEC	SEC Enforcement Director Linda Thomsen leaves the SEC	
Linda Thomsen	Davis Polk	Partner	April 12, 2009?	Joins law firm	Former SEC Enforcement Director Linda Thomsen joins Davis Polk: "Thomsen will advise clients on internal investigations and defend them against SEC probes."	
Gary Aguirre			June 29, 2010		The SEC agrees to pay Aguirre $755,000 based on four years and ten months of lost salary after Aguirre was fired by the agency in 2005, plus his attorney fees	

== Return to private practice ==
Aguirre now specializes in securities law, defending those victimized by investor fraud and those wishing to come forward to expose abuses. In 2008, he returned to San Diego with a reputation for winning cases.

He continued to work on the Pequot insider trading investigation, collecting and piecing together evidence, gaining information through Freedom of Information Act (FOIA) requests. In April 2008, he obtained a court order forcing the SEC to give him key records of its then closed Pequot investigation and later that year, he uncovered the evidence necessary to prove an insider trading charge against Pequot, founder Arthur Samberg and his former employee, David Zilkha On January 2, 2009, Aguirre sent a 16-page letter with the evidence to Christopher Cox, then SEC chairman. In it, he argued that there was sufficient evidence to reopen the case and he recommended that the U.S. Department of Justice open an investigation of Pequot, Samberg and Zilkha for possible witness tampering, bribery, obstruction of justice, and violation of the Racketeer Influenced and Corrupt Organizations Act. Because the SEC continued to stonewall, on May 26, 2010, Aguirre sought an order directing the SEC to release additional Pequot records to him. He argued that because the SEC had failed to file charges against Pequot or anyone else, under the FOIA, the SEC must turn over the records. The following morning, on May 27, 2010, using allegations that closely follow Aguirre's January letter, the SEC filed charges against Pequot, Samberg and Zilkha.

Aguirre is helping Senator Grassley's staff examine 21,000 Federal Reserve (the Fed) transactions involving taxpayer funds distributed to banks and other financial institutions. The Fed was forced to reveal the information by Freedom of Information Act (FOIA) requests by Bloomberg News and Fox News, as well as provisions contained in Wall Street reform legislation. Despite pronouncements by the Fed about its transparency, the information released has been incomplete. The lack of details make it impossible to tell just how much profit the recipients of the funds are making and only the recipients' names and amount of funds are known. Aguirre says that between $3 and $4 trillion in cash transfers were made and another $9 to $11 trillion in commitments that taxpayer funds would cover the cost of failed investments. "It looks like they are borrowing the money from the Fed, say, at 70 cents on the dollar and selling it back to the Fed for 90 cents. We can't tell for certain because the Fed won't tell us. The Fed publishes information but not enough for you to figure out what the hell happened," Aguirre said.

Aguirre represents Darcy Flynn, an SEC lawyer who also became a whistleblower after Robert Khuzami asked his staff in an e-mail on May 18, 2011 to report any questionable behavior on the part of lawyers representing clients. Though Khuzami had meant lawyers outside the SEC, Flynn reported activity that had taken place within the SEC. Early in Flynn's 13-year career at the SEC, he worked on a case where investigators thought they had clear evidence of fraud against Deutsche Bank. In an interview with Der Spiegel, CEO Rolf Breuer had denied the bank was involved in talks to acquire Bankers Trust, causing Bankers Trust stock to drop, which could lower the cost of a merger. SEC investigators began looking into the matter, collecting sworn testimony and documents that proved Breuer had lied. Deutsche Bank hired former SEC enforcement director Gary Lynch to persuade the SEC not to pursue the case, which had to be approved by superiors before proceeding. Approval to go forward with the case was approved by every level and lacked only the signature of Richard H. Walker, then serving as SEC enforcement director. Rather than approve the case, on July 10, 2001 he recused himself. On July 23, 2001, a letter was sent to Deutsche Bank informing them, ""Inquiry in the above-captioned matter has been terminated." The SEC dropped the fraud investigation without the customary explanation of its decision to close the case. On October 1, 2001, Walker was hired as general counsel by Deutsche Bank. In 2004, he hired Khuzami to work at the bank and a few years later, recommended him to become SEC enforcement director. Flynn was interviewed by staff from three congressional committees in summer 2011 on the Deutsche Bank case and the destruction of files from thousands of preliminary investigation cases conducted by the SEC. Senator Grassley wrote a letter to the SEC about the document destruction and SEC inspector general H. David Kotz investigated the matter.

== Predicted the 2008 financial collapse ==
In 2006, while testifying before Senator Arlen Specter and the Senate Judiciary Committee about Mack, Pequot Capital and the SEC lack of oversight, he warned that SEC enforcement was dangerously lax. He said that the SEC had recovered a mere $110,000 from hedge fund insider trading over one year when the Committee itself had found evidence that over a one-year period, more than 41% of all mergers and acquisitions of over a billion dollars involved insider trading. Aguirre warned that lack of effective oversight of rampant corruption was allowing Wall Street the same unregulated market abuse and leveraging that caused the Wall Street crash of 1929. In 2008, he delivered a similar message at the Sibos conference in Vienna. Just prior to the collapse of Bear Stearns, he wrote a letter to the Senate Banking Committee that the nation's banks, and particularly Bear Stearns, were at risk because of subprime debt exposure and credit default swaps. In September 2008, during the debate on the Troubled Asset Relief Program (TARP), Aguirre's projections on the costs of the taxpayer bailout were cited on the floor of the U.S. House of Representatives.

== Continuing critic ==
Aguirre is frequently quoted and interviewed in the media regarding issues related to financial and securities law and whistleblowers. Aguirre says the SEC has completely lost sight of its mission and that the mentality and culture won't change until the agency is no longer "run by attorneys who are on sabbatical" from Wall Street.

On July 22, 2010, President Barack Obama signed Wall Street reform legislation, the Dodd–Frank Wall Street Reform and Consumer Protection Act, which included a provision to exempt the SEC from FOIA requests by the public. Aguirre used FOIA requests to obtain records relating to why his SEC superiors had stymied his Pequot investigation, charges which prompted two U.S. Senate committees to investigate. The documents, released against the wishes of the SEC, led to the discovery of evidence that resulted in a large settlement. Aguirre was the first to speak out about the exemptions and a letter by Congressman Darrell Issa to Mary Schapiro, chairman of the SEC relied heavily on his article, "The Dodd-Frank Act: A FOIA Exemption for SEC Misconduct?" from Wall Street Lawyer. Congressional testimony by the Project on Government Oversight at a hearing on legislative proposals to address the problem referred to Aguirre's case as an example of the crucial need for public oversight of government agencies. Aguirre said the new bill would block public access to the SEC's records and hamper oversight. Other critics called the bill a "backroom deal" between the SEC and the U.S. Congress to cover up SEC failures.

All the agencies have to some extent or another a revolving door. But at the SEC, what you rotate into is an enormous salary leap. SEC managers may make $200,000. That same person may make $2 million as a starting salary on the outside and can move up from there. Now, when he leaves, I'm not sure he's worth $2 million as a lawyer, but he takes his Rolodex with him and that Rolodex is gold. The system maintains itself, because those that stay know their turn will come if they play the game.

— Gary J. Aguirre

The following week, first the Senate and then the House unanimously passed bills to repeal the exemptions. Obama signed the bill repealing the exemption on October 5, 2010.

Aguirre describes the SEC as an agency created to protect the public from Wall Street, but now protects Wall Street from the public, and calls it a revolving door, where people move from SEC positions to highly lucrative positions on Wall Street and also in reverse. "All the agencies have to some extent or another a revolving door [where government employees move to the private sector and earn more money]. But at the SEC, what you rotate into is an enormous salary leap. SEC managers may make $200,000. That same person may make $2 million as a starting salary on the outside and can move up from there. Now, when he leaves, I'm not sure he's worth $2 million as a lawyer, but he takes his Rolodex with him and that Rolodex is gold. The system maintains itself, because those that stay know their turn will come if they play the game. They see a director or associate director move onto a $2 million job with a Wall Street law firm. Then, the departed employee calls back to his former colleagues and says, 'you know I really don't think there is much of a case against so-and-so, I'd like for you to take a look at it.' And the case goes away; the system goes on in perpetuity." Two of Aguirre's supervisors left the SEC for lucrative positions at private law firms. Paul Berger works at Debevoise and Plimpton. After failing to investigate the Bernie Madoff ponzi scheme, Linda Chatman Thomsen left her position as SEC Enforcement Director to become a partner at Davis Polk & Wardwell, where according to the Wall Street Journal, she would be part of its "white-collar defense group". Robert Khuzami, who succeeded her, worked as a prosecutor in the U.S. Attorney's office in Manhattan's Southern District of New York, then went to Deutsche Bank for several years before returning being named SEC Enforcement Director. (Note: Other former SEC Directors of Enforcement who moved to the private sector are Richard H. Walker who went to Deutsche Bank in 2001 and Gary Lynch, who went to Davis Polk directly from the SEC in 1996. (See New York Times articles: "Deutsche Bank Hires Former S.E.C. Official" October 2, 2001 and Reed Abelson, "Gary Lynch, Defender of Companies, Has His Critics" September 3, 1996.) Lynch is now with Morgan Stanley, where he was hired by John Mack, who described him as "a lawyer with a businessperson's mentality." (See "Mack Hires Ex-Colleague as Morgan Stanley's Legal Officer" by Landon Thomas, Jr. in The New York Times, July 19, 2005.))

The SEC's handling of the investigation of Pequot's $18 million profit on Heller Financial, contrasts sharply with their aggressive pursuit of a low-level GE employee and a kung fu instructor who made a much smaller trade on Heller, earning a profit of just over $150,000. (Note: Pequot was forced to forfeit its $18 million gain, pay $10 million in penalties and Samberg was barred from working as an investment advisor. He did not face criminal charges and the statute of limitations on the trade ran out in 2006. The former GE employee and kung fu instructor were tried in court and sentenced to prison, 15 months and 8 months respectively. They also had to return their $157,259 gain, which they had split between them. In addition, before he was fired by the SEC, Aguirre had been investigating more than a dozen instances of insider trading by Pequot. (See SEC Litigation Release No. 18086 at the SEC website, April 14, 2003.)) According to Aguirre, decisions to pursue small cases and ignore the much larger ones involving the financial elite are less the exception, than the rule and explain why Bernie Madoff was ignored for so long.

In April 2012, representing whistleblower Rodolfo Michelson, Aguirre filed an FOIA claim against the SEC related to Michelson's claims that Sempra Global bribed Mexican government officials in order to advance its projects. Michelon filed suit against the SEC after an SEC investigation into the bribes concluded that the charges had been addressed. The suit alleges that the SEC "outsourced" its investigation to a law firm with ties to Sempra and seeks SEC records that indicate how the SEC conducted the investigation. Baker & McKenzie and Jones Day investigated the bribery charges. Sempra's executive vice president and general counsel was previously a partner at Jones Day. Aguirre said, "The notion that there is a class of companies, Fortune 500 Companies and Wall Street banks and Wall Street in general who are able to conduct their own investigations through favorite law firms is repugnant to the host of regulations that require the SEC to be neutral, unbiased and treat everybody the same."

== Education ==
Aguirre received a Bachelor of Science degree from the University of California, Berkeley in 1962, and a law degree from Boalt Hall in 1966, where he was the recipient of a Ford Foundation grant.

During a trip to Russia in 1987, Aguirre met some filmmakers at the Moscow Film Festival and discovered an interest in film. Having reached his professional and financial goals, Aguirre left his law practice in 1995. He returned to college, earning a Master of Fine Arts degree in film from UCLA.

While living in Spain in 2000, he became transfixed by the Bush v. Gore case and began thinking about the letter he had received from Robert F. Kennedy, which he had kept because it inspired him. Re-reading the letter, he was again inspired, reminded that lawyers can have a role beyond construction-defect cases.

At the age of 61, Aguirre went back to law school at Georgetown University Law Center to study international and securities law. Aguirre received a Master of Laws degree with distinction (honors) in 2003 and in January 2004, his LL.M thesis won second place in the Association of Securities and Exchange Commission Alumni Annual Securities Law Writing Competition and was published in the Delaware Journal of Corporate Law. Four of his professors were on the SEC staff, including one, Mark Kreitman, who later became his supervisor at the SEC. Kreitman described Aguirre as "the best student he had ever had". After graduation, he wanted to enter public service and an advisor suggested he apply for a fraud investigator's job that had come available at the SEC.

== Personal ==
Aguirre's son is musician Gary Jules; his younger brother, Michael, was the San Diego city attorney from 2004 to 2008.

== Selected publications ==
- "The Enron Decision: Closing the Fraud-Free Zone on Errant Gatekeepers?" (PDF) Delaware Journal of Corporate Law, Vol. 28, No. 2 (2003)
- "Section 10(b) Has Hatched a New Theory of Securities Fraud, But Will It Fly?" (PDF) Consumer Attorneys of California Forum (January/February 2004)
- "The Dodd-Frank Act: A FOIA Exemption for SEC Misconduct?" (PDF) Wall Street Lawyer, Vol. 14, Issue 9 (September 2010)
- "SEC’s Madoff Miss Fits Pattern Set With Pequot" Bloomberg News (February 4, 2009). Retrieved February 18, 2011

== See also ==
- List of whistleblowers
- Regulatory capture
- Mark Pittman – predicted the 2008 financial crisis and filed an FOIA lawsuit against the Federal Reserve
- Inside Job – Academy Award-winning documentary about "the systemic corruption of the United States by the financial services industry ... and the consequences of that systemic corruption"
- Term Asset-Backed Securities Loan Facility – Federal Reserve program
