= Regulatory capture =

Form of political corruption

In politics, regulatory capture (also called agency capture) is a form of corruption of authority that occurs when a political entity, policymaker, or regulator is co-opted to serve the commercial, ideological, or political interests of a minor constituency, such as a particular geographic area, industry, profession, or ideological group.

When regulatory capture occurs, a special interest is prioritized over the general interests of the public, leading to a net loss for society. The theory of client politics is related to that of rent-seeking and political failure; client politics "occurs when most or all of the benefits of a program go to some single, reasonably small interest (e.g., industry, profession, or locality) but most or all of the costs will be borne by a large number of people (for example, all taxpayers)".

== Theory ==
Interstate Commerce Commission (ICC) as Barrier-to-Competition: Applications-to-Operate vs In-Operation

For public choice theorists, regulatory capture occurs because groups or individuals with high-stakes interests in the outcome of policy or regulatory decisions can be expected to focus their resources and energies to gain the policy outcomes they prefer, while members of the public, each with only a tiny individual stake in the outcome, will ignore it altogether. Regulatory capture refers to the actions of interest groups when this is successful at influencing the staff or commission members of the regulator.

... as a rule, regulation is acquired by the industry and is designed and operated primarily for its benefit... We propose the general hypothesis: every industry or occupation that has enough political power to utilize the state will seek to control entry. In addition, the regulatory policy will often be so fashioned as to retard the rate of growth of new firms.

— George Stigler, The Theory of Economic Regulation (1971)

Regulatory capture theory is a core focus of the branch of public choice referred to as the economics of regulation; economists in this specialty are critical of conceptualizations of governmental regulatory intervention as being motivated to protect the public good. Often cited articles include Bernstein (1955), Huntington (1952), Laffont & Tirole (1991), and Levine & Forrence (1990). The theory of regulatory capture is associated with Nobel laureate economist George Stigler, one of its major developers.

The likelihood of regulatory capture is a risk to which an agency is exposed by its very nature. This suggests that a regulator should be protected from outside influence as much as possible. Alternatively, it may be better to not create a given agency at all. A captured regulator is often worse than no regulation, because it wields the authority of government. However, increased transparency of the agency may mitigate the effects of capture. Recent evidence suggests that, even in mature democracies with high levels of transparency and media freedom, more extensive and complex regulatory environments are associated with higher levels of corruption (including regulatory capture).

Stigler framed the problem of regulatory capture as "the problem of discovering when and why an industry is able to use the state for its purposes". He focuses on whole industries. But, it is never a whole industry that is 'capturing' its regulators, but only the big companies that, using the tool of the revolving door, 'highjack' the regulator by offering high salaries. Brezis and Cariolle (2019) have shown that the connected firms are always the big firms. Indeed, the top 5 financial companies concentrate around 80% of the stock of revolving door movements and regulatory capture. This leads to inequality of influence among firms in the same sector.

It should also be noted that regulatory capture in developed countries is not anymore related to corruption and illegal behavior, but to abuse of power.

=== Types ===
There are two basic types of regulatory capture:

- Materialist capture, also called financial capture, in which the captured regulator's motive is based on its material self-interest. This can result from bribery, revolving doors, political donations, political corruption or the regulator's desire to maintain its funding.
- Non-materialist capture, also called cognitive capture, can be caused by bias in the representation of public interests, which through consensus decision-making can be adopted by regulatory agencies and law. This can result from interest groups lobbying for the industry. Highly specialized technical industries can pose a risk of cultural capture because the regulating agency typically needs to employ experts in the regulated area, and the pool of such experts typically consists largely of existing or former employees from the regulated industry.

While large firms can capture regulators due to their larger material and non-material resources, small firms are more prone to retain capture via a special underdog rhetoric.

=== Relationship with federalism ===
There is substantial academic literature suggesting that smaller government units are easier for small, concentrated industries to capture than large ones. For example, a group of states or provinces with a large timber industry might have their legislature and/or their delegation to the national legislature captured by lumber companies. These states or provinces then become the voice of the industry, even to the point of blocking national policies that would be preferred by the majority across the whole country. Moore and Giovinazzo (2012) call this the "distortion gap".

The opposite is possible. Very large and powerful industries (e.g., energy, banking, weapon system construction) can capture national governments, and then use that power to block policies at the national, state or provincial level that the voters may want, although even local interests can thwart national priorities.

=== Economic rationale ===
Regulatory capture has an economic basis: vested interests in an industry have the greatest financial stake in regulations affecting them, and so are more likely to try to influence the regulator than relatively dispersed individual consumers, each with little incentive. When regulators form expert bodies to examine policy, these invariably feature current or former industry members, or at the very least, individuals with lives and contacts in the industry. Capture is also facilitated where consumers or taxpayers have a poorer understanding of underlying issues than businesses.

Jon Hanson and his co-authors argue that the phenomenon extends beyond political agencies and organizations. Businesses have an incentive to control anything that has power over them, including the media, academia and popular culture, and will try to capture them too. This is called "deep capture".

Regulatory public interest is based on market failure and welfare economics. It holds that regulation is the response of the government to public needs. Its purpose is to make up for market failures, improve the efficiency of resource allocation, and maximize social welfare. Posner states that the public interest theory contains the assumption that the market is fragile, and that if left unchecked, it will tend to be unfair and inefficient, and government regulation is a costless and effective way to meet the needs of social justice and efficiency. Mimik states that government regulation is a public administration policy that focuses on private behavior. It is a rule drawn from the public interest. Irving and Brouhingan state that regulation is a way of obeying public needs and weakening the risk of market operations. They also expressed the view that regulation reflects the public interest.

== History ==
The review of the United States history of regulation at the end of the 19th century, especially the regulation of railway tariffs by the Interstate Commerce Commission (ICC) in 1887, revealed that regulations and market failures are not co-relevant. At least until the 1960s, regulation was developed in the direction of favoring producers, and regulation increased the profits of manufacturers within the industry. In potentially competitive industries such as trucking and taxis, regulations allow higher prices and prevent entrants. In monopoly industries such as electric power generation, there is evidence that regulation has little effect on prices, so the industry can earn excess profits. Evidence shows that regulation is beneficial to producers.

These observations led to the emergence and development of regulatory capture theory. Contrary to regulatory public interest theory, this holds that the provision of regulation adapts to the industry's needs, that is, both the legislator and regulator are controlled and captured by the industry. The basic view of the theory is that the regulator gets captured no matter how the regulatory scheme is designed. The implication is that regulation increases the industry's profits rather than the social welfare.

This was essentially a purely capture theory in the early days, that is, the regulators and legislators were captured and controlled by the industry. Later regulatory models, such as those by Stigler, Pelzmann, or Becker, follow the regulatory capture theory in the eyes of Posner (1974) and others. All these models reflect that regulators and legislators are trying to maximize private, not public, interests. They use the "private interest" theory to explain the origin and purpose of regulation. Aton (1986) argues that Stigler's theoretical logic is clearer and more central than the previous "capture theory" hypothesis, but it is difficult to distinguish between the two.

Regulatory capture theory has a specific meaning, that is, an experience statement that regulations are beneficial for producers in real life. So it is essentially not a true regulatory theory. Although the analysis results are similar to the Stigler model, the methods are completely different. Stigler used standard economic analysis methods to analyze the regulation behavior, then created a new regulatory theory – regulatory economic theory. Of course, different divisions depend on the criteria for division, and they essentially depend on the researchers' different understanding of specific concepts.

Justice Douglas' dissent in Sierra Club v. Morton (1972) describes concern that regulators become too favorable with their regulated industries.

== Examples ==
=== Europe ===
==== Aberfan disaster ====
On 21 October 1966, a tip containing spoil and tailings from Merthyr Vale Colliery slipped after a period of heavy rain, killing 116 children and 28 adults in the Welsh village of Aberfan. In contravention of the National Coal Board's procedures, the tip was partly based on the ground from which water springs were known to emerge. After three weeks of rain, the tip became saturated and 140,000 cubic yards (110,000 m^{3}) of spoil and tailings slipped down the side of the hill, engulfing Pantglas Junior School and a row of houses.

Iain McLean and Martin Johnes, in a 2000 study of the Aberfan disaster, observed that Her Majesty's Inspectorate of Mines went largely unchallenged by the tribunal, although the two consider that the organisation failed in its duty, falling in line with the interests of the National Coal Board whose activities they were supposed to be overseeing.

==== Motorcyclists' protective clothing standards ====
With the advent of the European standard for motorcyclists' protective clothing (EN 17092), Bennetts and Motor Cycle News asserted that "the testing standards now used to certify motorcycle riding kit have reduced protection levels by as much as 90%" because of regulatory capture as industry representatives accounted for half the standards committee members including its chair, noting "Few will be aware of the intense opposition [to higher safety standards] from within the industry." However, there is a shortage of academic research into regulatory capture regarding motorcyclists' PPE standards.

=== United States ===
==== Bureau of Ocean Energy Management, Regulation and Enforcement ====
In the aftermath of the 2010 Deepwater Horizon oil spill, the Minerals Management Service (MMS), which had regulatory responsibility for offshore oil drilling, was widely cited as an example of regulatory capture. The MMS then became the Bureau of Ocean Energy Management, Regulation and Enforcement (BOEMRE) and on October 1, 2010, the collection of mineral leases was split off from the agency and placed under the Department of the Interior as the Office of Natural Resources Revenue (ONRR). On October 1, 2011, BOEMRE was then split into two bureaus, the Bureau of Safety and Environmental Enforcement (BSEE) and the Bureau of Ocean Energy Management (BOEM).

The three-stage reorganization, including the name change to BOEMRE, was part of a re-organization by Ken Salazar, who was sworn into office as the new Secretary of the Interior on the same day the name change was announced. Salazar's appointment was controversial because of his ties to the energy industry. As a senator, Salazar voted against an amendment to repeal tax breaks for ExxonMobil and other major petroleum companies and in 2006, he voted to end protections that limit offshore oil drilling in Florida's Gulf Coast. One of Salazar's immediate tasks was to "[end] the department's coziness with the industries it regulates" but Daniel R. Patterson, a member of the Arizona House of Representatives, said "Salazar has a disturbingly weak conservation record, particularly on energy development, global warming, endangered wildlife and protecting scientific integrity. It's no surprise oil and gas, mining, agribusiness and other polluting industries that have dominated Interior are supporting rancher Salazar – he's their friend". Indeed, a spokesman for the National Mining Association, which lobbies for the mining industry, praised Salazar, saying that he was not doctrinaire about the use of public lands.

MMS had allowed BP and dozens of other companies to drill in the Gulf of Mexico without first attaining permits to assess threats to endangered species, as required by law. BP and other companies were also given a blanket exemption (categorical exclusion) from having to provide environmental impact statements. The National Oceanic and Atmospheric Administration (NOAA) issued strong warnings about the risks posed by such drilling and in a 2009 letter, accused MMS of understating the likelihood and potential consequences of a major spill in the Gulf of Mexico. The letter further accused MMS of highlighting the safety of offshore drilling while understating the risks and impact of spills and playing down the fact that spills had been increasing. Both current and former MMS staff scientists said their reports were overruled and altered if they found a high risk of accident or environmental impact. Kieran Suckling, director of the Center for Biological Diversity, said, "MMS has given up any pretense of regulating the offshore oil industry. The agency seems to think its mission is to help the oil industry evade environmental laws".

After the Deepwater accident occurred, Salazar said he would delay granting any further drilling permits. Three weeks later, at least five more permits had been issued by the minerals agency. In March 2011, BOEMRE began issuing more offshore drilling permits in the Gulf of Mexico. Michael Bromwich, head of BOEMRE, said he was disturbed by the speed at which some oil and gas companies were shrugging off Deepwater Horizon as "a complete aberration, a perfect storm, one in a million", but would nonetheless soon be granting more permits to drill for oil and gas in the gulf.

==== Federal Aviation Administration ====
Since the Federal Aviation Administration (FAA) charter was amended in 1996, its sole focus has been the regulation of safety. (Prior to the deregulation of the US air industry, the Civil Aeronautics Board served to maintain an oligopoly of US airlines.)

A report by the U.S. Department of Transportation found that FAA managers had allowed Southwest Airlines to fly 46 airplanes in 2006 and 2007 that were overdue for safety inspections, ignoring concerns raised by inspectors. Audits of other airlines resulted in two airlines grounding hundreds of planes, causing thousands of flight cancellations. The House Transportation and Infrastructure Committee investigated the matter after two FAA whistleblowers, inspectors Charalambe "Bobby" Boutris and Douglas E. Peters, contacted them. Boutris said he attempted to ground Southwest after finding cracks in the fuselage, but was prevented by supervisors he said were friendly with the airline. The committee subsequently held hearings in April 2008. James Oberstar, former chairman of the committee said its investigation uncovered a pattern of regulatory abuse and widespread regulatory lapses, allowing 117 aircraft to be operated commercially although not in compliance with FAA safety rules. Oberstar said there was a "culture of coziness" between senior FAA officials and the airlines and "a systematic breakdown" in the FAA's culture that resulted in "malfeasance, bordering on corruption".

On July 22, 2008, a bill was unanimously approved in the House to tighten regulations concerning airplane maintenance procedures, including the establishment of a whistleblower office and a two-year "cooling off" period that FAA inspectors or supervisors of inspectors must wait before they can work for those they regulated. The bill also required the rotation of principal maintenance inspectors and stipulated that the word "customer" properly applies to the flying public, not those entities regulated by the FAA. The bill died in the United States Senate Committee on Commerce, Science, and Transportation that year. In 2008 the FAA proposed to fine Southwest $10.2 million for failing to inspect older planes for cracks, and in 2009 Southwest and the FAA agreed that Southwest would pay a $7.5 million penalty and would adopt new safety procedures, with the fine doubling if Southwest failed to follow through. In September 2009, FAA Administrator Randy Babbitt issued a directive mandating that the agency use the term "customers" only to refer to the flying public.

In a June 2010 article on regulatory capture, the FAA was cited as an example of "old-style" regulatory capture, "in which the airline industry openly dictates to its regulators its governing rules, arranging for not only beneficial regulation but placing key people to head these regulators".

That the FAA was a victim of regulatory capture was one focus of a United States Senate Commerce Subcommittee on Aviation and Space meeting held in the wake of the Ethiopian Airlines Flight 302 crash that followed a previous crash of a Lion Air flight and claimed 157 lives. The Boeing 737 MAX platform that crashed had been subjected to only an "amended" airworthiness type certificate. The NTSB was tasked with investigating the FAA's certification process.

As of 2023, aviation in the United States, the field in which the FAA is tasked to regulate, has had an unparalleled safety streak. Because of this, U.S. regulatory policy in this sector is regarded as one of the best in the world. With an estimated 29,000 flights daily, the United States hadn't had a major commercial aviation disaster since Colgan Air Flight 3407 in February 2009 until the 2025 Potomac River mid-air collision.

==== Federal Communications Commission ====
Legal scholars have pointed to the possibility that federal agencies such as the Federal Communications Commission (FCC) have been captured by media conglomerates. Peter Schuck of Yale Law School has argued that the FCC is subject to capture by the media industries' leaders and therefore reinforce the operation of corporate cartels in a form of "corporate socialism" that serves to "regressively tax consumers, impoverish small firms, inhibit new entry, stifle innovation, and diminish consumer choice". The FCC selectively granted communications licenses to some radio and television stations in a process that excluded other citizens and little stations from having access to the public.

Michael K. Powell, who served on the FCC for eight years and was chairman for four, was appointed president and chief executive officer of the National Cable & Telecommunications Association, a lobby group, effective April 25, 2011. His role has been the cable industry's leading advocate, spokesman, and representative in its relationship with the U.S. Congress, the Administration, the FCC, and other federal agencies.

Meredith Attwell Baker was one of the FCC commissioners who approved a controversial merger between NBC Universal and Comcast. Four months later, she announced her resignation from the FCC to join Comcast's Washington, D.C. lobbying office. Legally, she is prevented from lobbying anyone at the FCC for two years and an agreement made by Comcast with the FCC as a condition of approving the merger will ban her from lobbying any executive branch agency for life. Nonetheless, Craig Aaron, of Free Press, who opposed the merger, complained that "the complete capture of government by industry barely raises any eyebrows" and said public policy would continue to suffer from the "continuously revolving door at the FCC".

In July 2019, congresswomen Elizabeth Warren and Pramila Jayapal issued a letter (citing a report by the Project On Government Oversight) showing concerns for the composition of the FCC's Communications Security, Reliability and Interoperability Council (CSRIC), questioning whether it could effectively serve the public interest if the majority of its members were representatives of the private sector. They wrote that "having the FCC's policy-making process rely on input from individuals employed by, or affiliated with, the corporations that it is tasked with overseeing is the very definition of regulatory capture".

==== Food and Drug Administration ====
The Food and Drug Administration is considered to be an agency suffering from regulatory capture. A prime example is the Prescription Drug User Fee Act of 1992. Drug companies pay for much of their own costs when the FDA is going through the review and approval process for pharmaceutical drugs. One example was alosetron (Lotronex) which was approved in 1999 but quickly withdrawn in 2000 and reapproved in 2002. FDA safety advisers like Paul Stolley warned the agency was becoming subservient to pharmaceutical companies and putting lives at risk. Transcripts from the meetings with FDA regulators show them granting the company deferential judgement and shying away from openly criticizing the company with any major concerns. Another aspect of regulator capture is the revolving door of pharmaceutical executives going to work at the FDA and vice versa. This most recently evident in the lead up to the pandemic and its unfolding. For example, FDA commissioner Scott Gottlieb joined the board of directors for Pfizer in 2019. His successor Stephen Han went on the join the VC behind Moderna in 2021.

==== Federal Reserve Bank of New York ====
The Federal Reserve Bank of New York (New York Fed) is the most influential of the Federal Reserve Banking System. Part of the New York Fed's responsibilities is the regulation of Wall Street, but its president is selected by and reports to a board dominated by the chief executives of some of the banks it oversees. While the New York Fed has always had a closer relationship with Wall Street, during the years that Timothy Geithner was president, he became unusually close with the scions of Wall Street banks, a time when banks and hedge funds were pursuing investment strategies that caused the 2008 financial crisis, which the Fed failed to stop.

During the crisis, several major banks that were on the verge of collapse were rescued via the Emergency Economic Stabilization Act of 2008. Geithner engineered the New York Fed's purchase of $30 billion of credit default swaps from American International Group (AIG), which it had sold to Goldman Sachs, Merrill Lynch, Deutsche Bank and Société Générale. By purchasing these contracts, the banks received a "back-door bailout" of 100 cents on the dollar for the contracts. Had the New York Fed allowed AIG to fail, the contracts would have been worth much less, resulting in much lower costs for any taxpayer-funded bailout. Geithner defended his use of unprecedented amounts of taxpayer funds to save the banks from their own mistakes, saying the financial system would have been threatened. At the January 2010 congressional hearing into the AIG bailout, the New York Fed initially refused to identify the counterparties that benefited from AIG's bailout, claiming the information would harm AIG. When it became apparent this information would become public, a legal staffer at the New York Fed e-mailed colleagues to warn them, lamenting the difficulty of continuing to keep Congress in the dark. Jim Rickards calls the bailout a crime and says "the regulatory system has become captive to the banks and the non-banks".

==== Interstate Commerce Commission ====
Historians, political scientists, and economists have often used the Interstate Commerce Commission (ICC), a now-defunct federal regulatory body in the United States, as a classic example of regulatory capture. The creation of the ICC was the result of widespread and longstanding anti-railroad agitation. Richard Olney, a prominent railroad lawyer, was asked by a railroad president if he could do something to get rid of the ICC. Olney, who later was appointed Attorney General in the Grover Cleveland administration, replied in an 1892 letter:

The Commission… is, or can be made, of great use to the railroads. It satisfies the popular clamor for government supervision of the railroads, at the same time that supervision is almost entirely nominal. Further, the older such a commission gets to be, the more inclined it will be found to take the business and railroad view of things.… The part of wisdom is not to destroy the Commission, but to utilize it.

While the Interstate Commerce Act forbade "undue and unreasonable prejudice" against interstate passengers, in the sixty-six years before Sarah Keys v. Carolina Coach Company (1955) the ICC had ruled against every black petitioner bringing a racial segregation complaint, earning the nickname "The Supreme Court of the Confederacy". The ICC then failed to enforce Keys vs. Carolina Coach, attempting to justify segregation on a separate but equal basis for six years before being forced by the Department of Justice under then-Attorney General Robert F. Kennedy to act in response to the Freedom Riders protests of 1961.

==== Nuclear Regulatory Commission ====
According to physicist and nuclear policy expert Frank N. von Hippel, despite the 1979 Three Mile Island accident in Pennsylvania, the Nuclear Regulatory Commission (NRC) has often been too timid in ensuring that the country's 104 commercial nuclear power plants are operated safely:

Nuclear power is a textbook example of the problem of "regulatory capture" – in which an industry gains control of an agency meant to regulate it. Regulatory capture can be countered only by vigorous public scrutiny and Congressional oversight, but in the 32 years since Three Mile Island, interest in nuclear regulation has declined precipitously.

Then-candidate Barack Obama said in 2007 that the five-member NRC had become "captive of the industries that it regulates", and as vice president, Joe Biden indicated that he had absolutely no confidence in the agency.

On March 17, 2011, the Union of Concerned Scientists (UCS) released a study critical of the NRC's 2010 performance as a regulator. The UCS said that through the years, it had found the NRC's enforcement of safety rules has not been "timely, consistent, or effective" and it cited 14 "near-misses" at U.S. plants in 2010 alone. Tyson Slocum, an energy expert at Public Citizen said the nuclear industry has "embedded itself in the political establishment" through "reliable friends from George Bush to Barack Obama", and that the government "has really just become cheerleaders for the industry". The NRC has given a license to "every single reactor requesting one", according to Greenpeace USA nuclear policy analyst Jim Riccio to refer to the agency approval process as a "rubber stamp".

In Vermont, ten days after the 2011 Tōhoku earthquake and tsunami that damaged Japan's Daiichi plant in Fukushima, the NRC approved a 20-year extension for the license of Vermont Yankee Nuclear Power Plant, although the Vermont state legislature had voted overwhelmingly to deny such an extension. The Vermont plant uses the same GE Mark 1 reactor design as the Fukushima Daiichi plant. The plant had been found to be leaking radioactive materials through a network of underground pipes, which Entergy, the company running the plant, had denied under oath even existed. Representative Tony Klein, who chaired the Vermont House Natural Resources and Energy Committee, said that when he asked the NRC about the pipes at a hearing in 2009, the NRC didn't know about their existence, much less that they were leaking.

A year-long Associated Press (AP) investigation showed that the NRC, working with the industry, has relaxed regulations so that ageing reactors can remain in operation. The AP found that wear and tear of plants, such as clogged lines, cracked parts, leaky seals, rust and other deterioration resulted in 26 alerts about emerging safety problems and may have been a factor in 113 of the 226 alerts issued by the NRC between 2005 and June 2011. The NRC repeatedly granted the industry permission to delay repairs and problems often grew worse before they were fixed. (Note: According to the AP, of the United States' 104 operating nuclear power plants, 82 are over 25 years old, the NRC has re-licensed 66 for 20 additional years and another 16 renewal applications are under review.)

However, a paper by Stanford University economics professors John B. Taylor and Frank A. Wolak compared the financial services and nuclear industries. While acknowledging both are susceptible in principle to regulatory capture, they concluded regulatory failure – including through regulatory capture – has been much more of a problem in the financial industry and even suggested the financial industry create an analog to the Institute of Nuclear Power Operations to reduce regulatory risk.

Although rare, there have been instances of a revolving door at the NRC. Jeffrey Merrifield, who was on the NRC from 1997 to 2008 and was appointed by presidents Clinton and Bush, left the NRC to take an executive position at The Shaw Group, which has a nuclear division regulated by the NRC. (Note: Pete Domenici, a former U.S. senator now promotes nuclear energy. Over the course of his 20 years in government, he received $1.25 million in political contributions connected with the energy sector. From 2000 to 2010, the nuclear industry and people who work in it, contributed $4.6 million to members of Congress, in addition to the $54 million spent by electric utilities, trade groups and other supporters to hire lobbyists, including some former members of Congress. (See Lichtblau 2011)) The NRC Inspector General's report detailed that Merrifield had voted twice on matters involving companies he had contacted about job prospects. In addition, the report noted that Merrifield called a senior executive at another utility to request that he encourage other companies to return calls about his job search. The report also noted that Merrifield failed to report certain reimbursed travel expenses for himself and his family.

One of those interviewed by the NRC Inspector General was Dale Klein, Chairman of the NRC at the time. Klein commented that "Merrifield generally was a staunch advocate of his chosen positions and was reluctant to change his mind." The interview notes also indicated that "other Commissioners also commented that Merrifield was excessively touting his accomplishments within [a] task force, but Klein indicated that this self-promoting tendency by Merrifield was not unique to this issue." Although the NRC referred the matter to the Justice Department for civil action and to the U.S. Attorney's office for criminal action, neither office pursued the matter. The same U.S. Attorney's Office declined all 20 similar referrals for prosecution during the period from 2004 to 2008.

==== Office of the Comptroller of the Currency ====
The Office of the Comptroller of the Currency (OCC) has strongly opposed the efforts of the 50 state attorneys general, who have banded together to penalize banks and reform the mortgage modification process, following the subprime mortgage crisis and the 2008 financial crisis. This example was cited in The New York Times as evidence that the OCC is "a captive of the banks it is supposed to regulate".

==== Securities and Exchange Commission ====
The United States Securities and Exchange Commission (SEC) has also been accused of acting in the interests of Wall Street banks and hedge funds and of dragging its feet or refusing to investigate cases or bring charges for fraud and insider trading. Financial analyst Harry Markopolos, who spent ten years trying to get the SEC to investigate Bernie Madoff, called the agency "nonfunctional, captive to the industry".

Similarly in the case of the Allen Stanford Ponzi scheme, there were repeated warnings of fraud from both inside and outside the SEC for more than a decade. But the agency did not stop the fraud until 2009, after the Madoff scandal became public in 2008.

The SEC has been found by the U.S. Senate Committee on Finance, the Senate Judiciary Committee and a federal district court to have illegally dismissed an employee in September 2005 who was critical of superiors' refusal to pursue Wall Street titan John Mack. Mack was suspected of giving insider information to Arthur J. Samberg, head of Pequot Capital Management, once one of the world's largest hedge funds. After more than four years of legal battles, former SEC investigator Gary J. Aguirre filed papers in a Freedom of Information Act (FOIA) case he had against the SEC, seeking an order to force the SEC to turn over Pequot investigation records to him on the grounds that they had not charged anyone. Aguirre had already provided incriminating evidence of Pequot's insider trading involving Microsoft trades to the SEC in a letter on January 2, 2009. The morning after Aguirre's FOIA papers were filed, the SEC announced they had filed charges against Pequot and Pequot had agreed to disgorge $18 million in illegal gains and pay $10 million in penalties. A month later, the SEC settled Aguirre's wrongful termination lawsuit for $755,000.

The list of officials who have left the SEC for highly lucrative jobs in the private sector and who sometimes have returned to the SEC includes Arthur Levitt, Robert Khuzami, Linda Chatman Thomsen, Richard H. Walker, Gary Lynch and Paul R. Berger. The Project on Government Oversight (POGO) released a report on May 13, 2011, which found that between 2006 and 2010, 219 former SEC employees sought to represent clients before the SEC. Former employees filed 789 statements notifying the SEC of their intent to represent outside clients before the commission, some filing within days of leaving the SEC.

Reporter Matt Taibbi calls the SEC a classic case of regulatory capture. On August 17, 2011, Taibbi reported that in July 2001, a preliminary fraud investigation against Deutsche Bank was stymied by Richard H. Walker, then SEC enforcement director, who began working as general counsel for Deutsche Bank in October 2001. Darcy Flynn, an SEC lawyer, the whistleblower who exposed this case also revealed that for 20 years, the SEC had been routinely destroying all documents related to thousands of preliminary inquiries that were closed rather than proceeding to formal investigation. The SEC is legally required to keep files for 25 years and destruction is supposed to be done by the National Archives and Records Administration. The lack of files deprives investigators of possible background when investigating cases involving those firms. Documents were destroyed for inquiries into Bernard Madoff, Goldman Sachs, Lehman Brothers, Citigroup, Bank of America and other major Wall Street firms that played key roles in the 2008 financial crisis. The SEC has since changed its policy on destroying those documents and as of August 2011, the SEC investigator general was investigating the matter.

==== Federal Trade Commission ====
The decision known as In re Amway Corp., popularly called "Amway '79", made the FTC a captive regulator of the nascent multi-level marketing industry. The situation came to a head in December 2012, when hedge fund Pershing Square Capital Management announced a $1-billion short position against the company, and evidently expected the FTC to act, which, to date, it has not. From a forensic accounting standpoint, there is no difference between a Ponzi scheme like the Madoff scandal, and a pyramid scheme, except that in the latter the money is laundered through product sales, not an investment. The press has widely reported on why the FTC won't act, e.g. Forbes though legal opinion has been very supportive in some quarters, such as William K. Black, who was instrumental in bringing thousands of criminal prosecutions in the S&L scandal, which was also rife with problems of regulatory capture.

==== District of Columbia Taxicab Commission ====
The District of Columbia Taxicab Commission has been criticized for being beholden to taxi companies and drivers rather than ensuring that the district has access to a "safe, comfortable, efficient and affordable taxicab experience in well-equipped vehicles".

==== Washington State Liquor and Cannabis Board and I-502 ====
Some commentators have acknowledged that while Washington Initiative 502 legalized marijuana, it did so in a manner that led to a state-run monopoly on legal marijuana stores with prices far above that of the existing medical dispensaries, which the Washington State Liquor and Cannabis Board is now trying to close down in favor of the recreational stores, where prices are two to five times higher than the product can be obtained elsewhere.

=== Australia ===
==== Financial services regulation ====
The Royal Commission into Misconduct in the Banking, Superannuation and Financial Services Industry, which reported in February 2019, found that the Australian Securities and Investments Commission (ASIC) had rarely gone to court to enforce the law and that its starting point on identifying misconduct should instead have been to ask "why not litigate?". Commissioner Kenneth Hayne recommended that a new authority be established to provide external oversight of ASIC and the Australian Prudential Regulation Authority (APRA); the Financial Regulator Assessment Authority was created in 2021 in response. The legal scholars Andrew Schmulow, Paul Mazzola and Daniel de Zilva, who had proposed such a body, argue that financial regulators are "susceptible to deliberate and inadvertent influence by the industry that they oversee" and that Australia's "twin peaks" model had not been sufficient to prevent systemic misconduct.

==== Murray–Darling Basin ====
Water governance in the Murray–Darling Basin has been analyzed using the frameworks of rent-seeking and regulatory capture. In a 2020 study, R. Quentin Grafton and John Williams examined two Commonwealth programs intended to secure an environmentally sustainable level of water diversions—targeted purchases of water entitlements from designated sellers, and subsidies for irrigation infrastructure—and identified deficiencies in delivering their stated environmental goals and questions about their value for money, proposing measures to mitigate rent-seeking and regulatory capture in the governance of large river basins.

==== Aviation ====
Australia's international aviation capacity is set by bilateral air services agreements negotiated by the federal government. In July 2023 the Minister for Infrastructure, Transport, Regional Development and Local Government, Catherine King, refused an application to roughly double Qatar Airways' entitlement of 28 weekly services to Australia's four largest airports. The responsible department had consulted only the two incumbent Australian international carriers, Qantas and Virgin Australia, about the request; Qantas opposed it. A Senate select committee reported in October 2023 that the government "has never specifically detailed the national interest grounds on which the request was rejected but has put forward at least 12 different arguments at various times", and recommended that future bilateral decisions be supported by cost–benefit analysis, consultation with the Australian Competition and Consumer Commission (ACCC) and a published statement of reasons. The Assistant Treasurer, Stephen Jones, was reported as saying that the decision was in the national interest and would help keep Qantas profitable. Two former ACCC chairs criticized the refusal, Allan Fels calling it "just looking after Qantas" and Rod Sims saying that measures which reduced competition required "really clear explanations". King said she had not taken "the commercial interests of either Qantas or Virgin into consideration", and government senators dissented from the committee's report.

Scrutiny also fell on Qantas's invitation-only Chairman's Lounge, membership of which is granted at the airline's discretion and cannot be purchased; by October 2024, 181 of the 227 members of the federal parliament had disclosed access to it on the registers of interests. Writing in the Australian Financial Review, Aaron Patrick described the lounge as central to a decades-long strategy of cultivating politicians and officials that had produced "a form of bureaucratic capture", in which transport ministers "found their department an advocate for Qantas"; he quoted a former minister as asking, "Who wanted to be the departmental secretary who opposed Qantas?" The chief executive of Transparency International Australia, Clancy Moore, said such benefits "can cast a shadow over elected officials' independence" and, combined with political donations and lobbying, could lead to "undue influence on policy making". Rico Merkert, a professor at the University of Sydney and a specialist in Australia's airline sector, said there were "instances where you could think the federal government has protected Qantas", but that whether this was attributable to lounge access was "impossible to know".

=== Canada ===
==== Canadian Radio-television and Telecommunications Commission ====
In August 2009, the Canadian Radio-television and Telecommunications Commission (CRTC) provisionally granted a request by Bell Canada to impose usage-based billing on Internet wholesalers, igniting protest from both the wholesalers and consumers, who claimed that the CRTC was "kow-towing to Bell".

On February 2, 2011, CRTC chair Konrad von Finckenstein testified before the House of Commons Standing Committee on Industry, Science and Technology to defend the agency's decision. Critic Steve Anderson said, "The CRTC's stubbornness in the face of a mass public outcry demonstrates the strength of the Big Telecom lobby's influence. While government officials have recognized the need to protect citizens' communications interests, the CRTC has made it clear that their priorities lie elsewhere".

=== Japan ===
In Japan, the line may be blurred between the goal of solving a problem and the different goal of making it look as if the problem is being addressed.

==== Nuclear and Industrial Safety Agency ====
Despite warnings about its safety, Japanese regulators from the Nuclear and Industrial Safety Agency (NISA) approved a 10-year extension for the oldest of the six reactors at Fukushima Daiichi just one month before a 9.0 magnitude earthquake and subsequent tsunami damaged reactors and caused a meltdown. The conclusion to the Diet of Japan's report on Fukushima attributed this directly to regulatory capture.

Nuclear opponent Eisaku Sato, governor of Fukushima Prefecture from 1988 to 2006, said a conflict of interest is responsible for NISA's lack of effectiveness as a watchdog. The agency is under the Ministry of Economy, Trade and Industry, which encourages the development of Japan's nuclear industry. Inadequate inspections are reviewed by expert panels drawn primarily from academia and rarely challenge the agency. Critics say the main weakness in Japan's nuclear industry is weak oversight. Seismologist Takashi Nakata said, "The regulators just rubber-stamp the utilities' reports".

Both the ministry and the agency have ties with nuclear plant operators, such as Tokyo Electric. Some former ministry officials have been offered lucrative jobs in a practice called amakudari, "descent from heaven". A panel responsible for re-writing Japan's nuclear safety rules was dominated by experts and advisers from utility companies, said seismology professor Katsuhiko Ishibashi, who quit the panel in protest, saying it was rigged and "unscientific". The new guidelines, established in 2006, did not set stringent industry-wide earthquake standards, rather nuclear plant operators were left to do their own inspections to ensure their plants were compliant. In 2008, the NISA found all of Japan's reactors to be in compliance with the new earthquake guidelines.

Yoshihiro Kinugasa helped write Japan's nuclear safety rules, later conducted inspections and still in another position at another date, served on a licensing panel, signing off on inspections.

==== Ministry of Health, Labour and Welfare (MHLW) ====
In 1996, the Ministry of Health and Welfare (now combined with the Ministry of Labour) came under fire over the scandal of HIV-tainted blood being used to treat hemophiliacs.

Although warned about HIV contamination of blood products imported from the U.S., the ministry abruptly changed its position on heated and unheated blood products from the U.S., protecting the Green Cross and the Japanese pharmaceutical industry, keeping the Japanese market from being inundated with heat-treated blood from the United States. Because the unheated blood was not taken off the market, 400 people died and over 3,000 people were infected with HIV.

No senior officials were indicted and only one lower-level manager was indicted and convicted. Critics say the major task of the ministry is the protection of industry, rather than of the population. In addition, bureaucrats get amakudari jobs at related industries in their field upon retirement, a system which serves to inhibit regulators. Moriyo Kimura, a critic who works at MHLW, says the ministry does not look after the interests of the public.

=== Philippines ===
Tobacco control in the Philippines is largely vested in the Inter-Agency Committee on Tobacco (IACT) under Republic Act No. 9211 (Tobacco Regulation Act of 2003). The IACT's membership includes pro-tobacco groups in the Department of Agriculture and National Tobacco Administration, as well as "a representative from the Tobacco Industry to be nominated by the legitimate and recognized associations of the industry", the Philippine Tobacco Institute (composed of the largest local cigarette producers and distributors). In a 2015 Philippine Supreme Court case, the Court ruled that the IACT as the "exclusive authority" in regulating various aspects tobacco control including access restrictions and tobacco advertisement, promotion, and sponsorships. In this case, the Department of Health, which is the primary technical agency for disease control and prevention, was held to be without authority to create tobacco control regulations unless the IACT delegates this function. The IACT's organization also limits the Philippines' enforcement of the World Health Organization Framework Convention on Tobacco Control.

=== International ===
==== World Trade Organization ====
The academic Thomas Alured Faunce has argued the World Trade Organization non-violation nullification of benefits claims, particularly when inserted in bilateral trade agreements, can facilitate intense lobbying by industry which can result in effective regulatory capture of large areas of governmental policy.

==== Artificial intelligence ====
It has been argued by some that proposed AI safety regulations function as a form of regulatory capture, particularly in the United States.

=== Other examples ===
McClean and Johnes argued that the sinking of the Titanic and its investigation illustrate an early example of regulatory failure and regulatory capture of the Board of Trade and Parliament by the shipping industry.

== See also ==
- Elon Musk
- DOGE
- Availability heuristic
- Campaign finance
- Concentrated benefits and diffuse costs
- Corporate welfare
- Crony capitalism
- Gaming the system
- Inverted totalitarianism
- Iron triangle (US politics)
- Mere-exposure effect
- Occupational licensing
- Regulator shopping
- Regulatory capitalism
- Rent seeking
- State capture

North American groups promoting transparency

- MAPLight.org, tracks money and politics in the U.S.
- Sunlight Foundation, promotes government transparency and accountability
