= Khuzami =

Khuzami is a surname. Notable people with the surname include:

- Robert Khuzami (born 1956), director of the Division of Enforcement of the U.S. Securities and Exchange Commission and former United States federal prosecutor and general counsel of Deutsche Bank AG
- Vicki Khuzami, American illustrator, muralist and set designer
