= H. David Kotz =

Member of the US Securities and Exchange Commission

David Kotz

Inspector General for the Securities and Exchange Commission
- In office December 5, 2007 – January 30, 2012
- President: George W. Bush; Barack Obama
- Preceded by: Nelson Egbert (Acting)
- Succeeded by: Noelle Maloney (Acting)

Inspector General of the Peace Corps
- In office January 6, 2006 – December 5, 2007
- President: George W. Bush
- Preceded by: Charles Smith
- Succeeded by: Kathy Buller

Personal details
- Born: Harold David Kotz; June 24, 1966 (age 59); Toronto, Canada
- Education: University of Maryland, College Park (BA); Cornell University (JD)

H. David Kotz, also known as Harold David Kotz (born June 24, 1966), is a managing director at Berkeley Research Group. While Inspector General at the U.S. Securities and Exchange Commission (SEC), Kotz investigated why the SEC failed to detect the $19 billion Madoff fraud.

Kotz was a litigation associate at three law firms from 1990–99, and then a labor attorney at the U.S. Agency for International Development from 1999–2002. He worked at the Peace Corps as a lawyer handling labor and violent crime matters, as well as Inspector General, from 2002–07.

He then was Inspector General at the U.S. Securities and Exchange Commission (SEC) from December 2007 until his resignation in January 2012. At the SEC, his department conducted investigations about improprieties, conflicts of interest, and the SEC's failure to uncover Ponzi schemes. He referred 30 cases to the Justice Department; 2 were prosecuted, leading to 1 conviction. In 2012, an independent review of his conduct by the Inspector General of the U.S. Postal Service concluded that Kotz violated conflict of interest rules by conducting investigations on persons with whom he had a personal relationship.

One conflict involved Kotz accepting three tickets to a football game at a subsidized cost from a financial adviser.

== Education ==
Kotz graduated cum laude from the University of Maryland, College Park in 1987, with a B.A. in government and politics, and earned his J.D. at Cornell Law School in 1990.

== Law firms (1990–99) ==
In his early career, Kotz worked as a litigation associate at three law firms, working on commercial litigation, discrimination, personal injury, and sexual harassment matters: Graham & James (1990–92) and Stults & Balber (1992–94) in New York City, and Pepper Hamilton LLP (1994–99) in Washington, DC.

== US Agency for International Development (1999–2002) ==
Kotz worked at the US Agency for International Development (USAID) from 1999–2002, where he was an Attorney Advisor in the Office of the General Counsel and later a Chief in the Office of Labor and Employee Relations.

== Peace Corps (2002–07) ==
Kotz joined the Peace Corps in 2002, and worked there until 2007, during which time he handled labor arbitrations, employee grievances, and prosecutions of rapes, sexual assaults, and other violent crimes against volunteers. For three years, he was an Associate General Counsel. Starting in 2006, he worked for the Peace Corps as Inspector General.

== SEC (2007–12) ==
In December 2007, Kotz next became the Inspector General at the Securities and Exchange Commission (SEC), following the resignation of his predecessor, Walter Stachnik. He was tasked with conducting independent objective audits of SEC procedures and practices promote economy, effectiveness, and efficiency. His reports touched on the SEC not uncovering the Madoff Ponzi scheme and the SEC's office-leasing program after the Dodd-Frank financial overhaul.

Kotz's tenure at the SEC was contentious and controversial, marked by critical investigations, charges that some of his investigations lacked evidence of wrongdoing and distorted facts to build a case, criticisms of him for conflicts of interest and ethics violations, and a determination that he had an inappropriate relationship with an SEC employee. According to his reports, he referred about 30 cases to the Justice Department, of which 2 were prosecuted, leading to 1 conviction, as of September 2011. Mary Schapiro, Chairman of the SEC, in her announcement of his departure from the SEC praised Kotz as a "committed public servant who has served the agency with great distinction."

=== Investigations ===
==== Madoff ====
Kotz investigated why the SEC failed to detect the $19 billion Madoff fraud. Madoff pleaded guilty to fraud and was serving a 150-year federal prison sentence when he died there in 2021 at age 82. He also investigated the responses by the SEC to written complaints about Madoff since 1992. In September 2009, Kotz issued a 477-page report that described numerous failures on the part of the SEC in failing to uncover Madoff's Ponzi scheme, despite three examinations and two investigations. Kotz followed that up with extensive recommendations for improvements to SEC procedures and training. Speaking of the Madoff victims, Kotz observed: "People's lives are destroyed, but they can find some solace in knowing there was change as a result."

Kotz's investigation found that the SEC received more than ample information in the form of detailed and substantive complaints over the years. The OIG found that between June 1992 and December 2008 when Madoff confessed, the SEC received six substantive complaints that raised significant red flags concerning Madoff's hedge fund operations and should have led to questions about whether Madoff was actually engaged in trading.

One of his findings in his Madoff-related investigations was that the SEC's General Counsel, David M. Becker, had a conflict of interest, as his family had invested $2 million with Madoff. Kotz referred the matter to the U.S. Justice Department's criminal division. Becker's lawyer said that SEC officials knew about the investments, and did not recommend that he recuse himself. Becker said:

I have seen Inspector General Kotz do this before, make a big fuss... about sending reports to the Justice Department. Nothing has happened in any of them, and some of them ... from my time at the SEC were laughable.

The Justice Department declined to pursue the matter.

He also investigated whether the romantic relationship between Eric Swanson, the SEC Assistant Director of the Office of Compliance Inspections and Examinations, and Bernie Madoff's niece and in-house compliance attorney Shana Madoff, whom Swanson met in 2003 while he was investigating her uncle Bernie and his firm for running a Ponzi scheme, influenced the SEC's closing of the Madoff investigation. Swanson left the SEC in 2006, became engaged to Shana Madoff three months later, and married her in 2007. Kotz concluded that there was no evidence that their relationship influenced the SEC's closing of the inquiry.

Financial analyst and whistleblower Harry Markopolos said that Kotz "was unflagging [and h]e restored my faith," in the Madoff affair.

==== Stanford ====
In March 2010, Kotz issued another report finding the SEC also failed to uncover a $7 billion Ponzi scheme perpetrated by Allen Stanford. Kotz found that the SEC had suspected since 1997 that Stanford was running a Ponzi scheme, but did not order a formal investigation until 2005. Kotz accused SEC attorney Spencer Barasch of having a conflict of interest, in that he participated in decisions not to investigate Stanford when he was head of enforcement in an SEC regional office, and then briefly representing Stanford before the SEC after leaving the SEC. In 2012, Barasch agreed to pay a $50,000 fine to settle a Justice Department conflict of interest claim. He stated he did not think he was guilty, but settled to avoid a lengthy court battle.

A subsequent 66-page report on Kotz's behavior by Inspector General David C. Williams of the U.S. Postal Service found that Kotz himself "appeared to have a conflict of interest" and shouldn’t have opened the investigation, because one of the lawyers involved was a personal friend of his.

==== Thomsen/Pequot Capital ====
Kotz investigated a controversy reported by a former SEC lawyer who claimed he was fired in order to thwart his investigation of insider trading at Pequot Capital Management. Kotz recommended that disciplinary action be commenced against Linda Chatman Thomsen, the Director of the Division of Enforcement for the SEC. His recommendation was not accepted, and no disciplinary action was taken.

==== Pornography ====
Kotz's investigations in 2010 and 2011 revealed that employees of the SEC had been using their work computers to access pornography sites during business hours. He released two reports documenting his findings.

==== SEC office lease ====
In 2011, Kotz issued a report criticizing the SEC for its 900,000-square-foot, $557 million, 10-year lease for new office space.

=== Controversy and departure ===
Employee Complaints

At least two formal complaints were filed against Kotz by SEC staff members (including Linda Baier, acting Branch Chief of Acquisition Policy, and Nancy McGinley, an enforcement attorney, in April 2011), with the Council of Inspectors General on Integrity and Efficiency (CIGIE). They alleged that Kotz distorted facts to build a case, and that he created a culture of fear at the SEC of Kotz's "false allegations and retaliations". Kotz sought to have Baier disciplined, but her managers declined to take action. Kotz similarly sent a criminal referral to federal prosecutors regarding trading by McGinley, but the Justice Department declined to act. Kotz denied the allegations, but ultimately left the SEC in the midst of a scandal concerning ethics and potential conflicts of interest. The allegations, which Kotz denied, were eventually dismissed.

Another complainant against Kotz was the office's former Chief of Investigations, David Weber, who accused Kotz of improper conduct in the Madoff investigation. In November 2012, after he was terminated by the SEC, Weber filed a federal lawsuit alleging that the Madoff and Stanford cases might have been compromised by Kotz's personal relationships with some of the people involved. An independent, outside review of Weber's charges by Inspector General David C. Williams of the U.S. Postal Service found that Kotz may have had conflicts of interest in several investigations due to having a personal relationship with the people being investigated. Kotz responded to the civil lawsuit saying that: "for some inexplicable reason, my name has been dragged through the mud in the most ludicrous and unbelievable allegations," saying that Weber was hired for a position a couple of weeks prior to Kotz' departure from the SEC, that Kotz barely interacted with him, and did not know anything about why Weber was placed on leave and eventually terminated or about Weber's allegations of retaliation. The SEC settled with Weber for $580,000, one of the highest SEC settlements in a whistleblower retaliation case, in May 2013.

Report on improper conduct by Kotz

Because of concerns of improper conduct by Kotz, Inspector General David C. Williams of the U.S. Postal Service was brought in to conduct an independent, outside review of Kotz's alleged improper conduct. Williams concluded in his Report that Kotz violated conflict of interest rules by conducting investigations on persons with whom he had a personal relationship. He also concluded that Kotz may have had an inappropriate relationship with an SEC employee.

One conflict of interest for which Kotz was criticized was his decision to buy three box-seat tickets to a Philadelphia Eagles football game from a financial adviser who had interviewed him for a radio program. Kotz paid $95 each for the tickets (less than half their actual value). Commenting on the matter, Professor Geoffrey Hazard, a legal ethics specialist, said that "However passionate a fan you might be of the Eagles, it's just imprudent" to take the tickets. Kotz called the incident: "an insignificant matter," saying that he paid face value for the tickets and got approval from the ethics office before he made the purchase.

The Report questioned Kotz's work on the Madoff investigation, because Kotz was friends with Harry Markopolos, who reported the case to the SEC. Investigators were unable to determine when the friendship began, and thus could not determine conclusively whether or not ethics rules had been violated.

The Report also found that Kotz should not have participated in a probe of the re-organization of the SEC’s office, because he engaged in “extensive” and “flirtatious” communications with a female SEC staffer associated with the project during the probe. Among other things, he emailed her in 2008 a suggestion that she buy a "short skirt or two," and as to the dress code he indicated that she would qualify for a “Special exemption for after work get togethers.” Kotz stated he didn't think he had said anything inappropriate, and denied having a personal relationship with the woman.

Senator Charles Grassley (R-Iowa) said in a statement that the Report revealed "poor judgment".

Departure

On January 17, 2012, Kotz resigned amid criticisms of his behavior and questions about his conduct, and the SEC announced that he would leave the agency at the end of January. Kotz announced that he was leaving the SEC, describing the reports he had issued as being "significant to the agency, Congress and the investing public".

Senator Grassley, an Iowa Republican who was a frequent critic of the SEC, said: "David Kotz produced strong, conclusive reports, even as critics claimed he was too aggressive. An aggressive, independent inspector general is best for the agency in the long run, even if that's uncomfortable for management."

== Gryphon Strategies (2012) ==
In late January 2012, Kotz joined Gryphon Strategies, a small New York corporate fraud investigation firm, as its Washington representative and managing director.

== Berkeley Research Group (2012–present) ==
In August 2012, Kotz joined the anti-corruption team as a director in the Financial Institutions practice at Berkeley Research Group. Kotz had become familiar with Berkeley when he hired the firm while he was at the SEC, during the Madoff investigation.

In 2013, at Berkeley Research Group, Kotz issued a report commissioned by the National Futures Association regarding a $215 million fraud perpetrated by Russell Wasendorf, as CEO of Peregrine Financial Group. The report found regulators missed warning signs as far back as 1994 and multiple opportunities to catch the fraud.

== Family ==
Kotz's wife Deborah is a reporter for the Boston Globe. The couple has three children.
