= Marver Bernstein =

American educator (1919–1990)

Marver Hillel Bernstein

4th President of Brandeis University
- In office 1972–1983
- Preceded by: Charles Irwin Schottland
- Succeeded by: Evelyn E. Handler

1st Dean, Woodrow Wilson School of Public and International Affairs
- In office 1964–1969

Personal details
- Born: February 7, 1919 Mankato, Minnesota
- Died: March 5, 1990 (aged 71) Cairo, Egypt
- Resting place: Temple of Aaron Cemetery, Roseville, Minnesota
- Spouse: Sheva (Rosenthal) Bernstein
- Education: University of Wisconsin (B.A, MA); Princeton University (Ph.D.)
- Profession: Educator

Marver Hillel Bernstein (1919-1990) was an American educator, Jewish lay leader, and the 4th President of Brandeis University. He served as a professor of political science at Princeton University and was its first Dean of the Woodrow Wilson School of Public and International Affairs. (Note: Initially established as the School of Public and International Affairs (SPIA) in 1930 to serve undergraduates, a graduate program was added in 1948 and the school was renamed for Woodrow Wilson, the college's 13th president. However, it was not led by a dean until it moved into the newly constructed Robertson Hall in the 1960s. In 2020, in response to Woodrow Wilson's history of racism, it was renamed The Princeton School of Public and International Affairs (SPIA).) After retiring from Brandeis, Bernstein was a professor of politics and philosophy at Georgetown University’s School of Foreign Service. He was also former president of the National Federation for Jewish Culture and the American Professors for Peace in the Middle East.

== Early life and education ==
Bernstein was born in Mankato, Minnesota and completed his BA and MA at the University of Wisconsin, where he was elected to Phi Beta Kappa. He earned a doctorate at Princeton.

== Early career ==
Bernstein served as a budget examiner for the federal government at the US Bureau of the Budget from 1942 until 1946. Bernstein was a professor at Princeton University for 26 years and was the first dean of Princeton's Woodrow Wilson School of Public and International Affairs from 1964 to 1969, as well as being influential in the selection of the design of Robertson Hall, the school's iconic building.

As a young professor at Princeton in the immediate post-war era, Bernstein served as one of the informal faculty advisors to Princeton's Liberal Union, an unaffiliated student group active from 1946 to 1951 that sought to end racial and religious discrimination at Princeton, particularly in admissions. The group acted to end Princeton's de facto exclusion of African Americans by mailing recruiting solicitations to over five hundred (Note: An LU member recalled the number being 1000 schools but the Daily Princetonian on references the 500 figure) historically black high schools. (New Jersey law banned discrimination, but Princeton was known to be inhospitable.) The Liberal Union also advocated for the establishment of a campus student union and dining facility that would serve all students, as the existing eating club system was seen as elitist and selected members in a manner similar to fraternities. Thus, Bernstein, along with other faculty advisors, (Note: Collaborating advisors to the Liberal Student Union were Prof. Willard Thorp and Prof. H. Hubert Wilson, a civil rights activist and noted antagonist of FBI director J. Edgar Hoover.) played an important if little-recognized role in reshaping Princeton into a more racially, religiously, and socially inclusive institution.

Bernstein's 1955 influential book, Regulating Business By Independent Commission was the first in a series of publications by scholars of regulation who posited what became known as the "captive agency theory." More broadly, the concept is referred to as regulatory capture.

== Late career ==
In 1972 Bernstein became Brandeis' fourth president where he served in that position for eleven years. After leaving Brandeis, he became a professor of politics and philosophy at Georgetown University's School of Foreign Service where he taught until just before his death. Bernstein was very active in Jewish organizations and served on the boards of the B'nai B'rith Hillel Foundation, the National Federation for Jewish Culture, American Professors for Peace in the Middle East, and numerous civic groups.

=== Tenure at Brandeis ===
Brandeis University had been founded in 1948 as a Jewish-sponsored secular university largely in response to discriminatory quotas Jews had faced entering existing private universities, particularly medical schools; as such it was committed to being "open to students and faculty of all races and religions." In that context, Bernstein expressed concern for ensuring Brandeis pursued an open dialog and process with students on improving the quality of the college.

In his inaugural address on Oct 5, 1972 Bernstein stated:

“The university not only undertakes a unique function in society; it also has a fascinating organizational character that differentiates it from other institutions. ...It depends more strongly on shared values and mutual understandings than any other human organization."

His goal for Brandeis in 1972 was to strengthen “the quality of education,” which “requires a process of full communication and meaningful participation in making difficult choices.”

Urging students, faculty and trustees to participate in Brandeis as an organization, Bernstein admitted that making decisions to build and grow a university requires disagreement and compromise. “Sharing in the responsibility for governing, however, is sobering. It requires hard, continuing effort,”

== Academics ==
Bernstein joined the faculty of Princeton University in 1946 and taught for approximately 25 years.

- 1946 Research Associate in Politics
- 1948 Assistant Professor
- 1954 Associate Professor
- 1958–72 Professor
- 1961–64 Chmn. Dept. of Politics
- 1964–69 Associate director; Dean, Woodrow Wilson School
- 1972–83 President, Brandeis University
- 1983–90 Professor, Georgetown University School of Foreign Service

== Jewish culture ==
From 1969 to 1975, Bernstein was chairman of the national commission of B'nai B'rith Hillel Foundations, the policy body for the Hillel centers on 284 college campuses. He was a former president of the National Federation for Jewish Culture, at the time, the leading advocate for Jewish cultural life and creativity in the United States, and the American Professors for Peace in the Middle East (APPME). He belonged to many civic groups, including the Massachusetts Ethics Commission and the United States Holocaust Memorial Council, and was an honorary trustee of the American Jewish Historical Society and the Foundation for Jewish Studies. He earned many honorary degrees.

== Government ==
Bernstein was sought as an advisor to local, state, and federal agencies and in 1967 brokered a deadlock over the reapportionment of New Jersey's legislative districts. Bernstein's negotiations represented an important chapter in the history of efforts to achieve bipartisan state redistricting. In 1966, New Jersey, amongst five other states, had proposed constitutional amendments to formalize bipartisan reapportionment provisions, with three, including New Jersey, achieving ratification. In New Jersey, apportionment was transferred to a commission, whose by-laws included a tie-breaker provision, a position to be appointed by the Chief Justice of the State Supreme Court.

Vindication of the convention's decision to provide for a tie breaker was not long coming. The Commission deadlocked, Professor Marver H. Bernstein, Dean of the Woodrow Wilson School of Public and International Affairs of Princeton University, was appointed by the New Jersey Chief Justice, and a plan was soon announced. ...Professor Bernstein's plan, adopted by an eight to three vote, effected a compromise between the interests of the parties in two of the large counties.

=== Contribution to structure of Israeli government ===
The Bernsteins maintained a residence in Jerusalem where they often lived outside of the academic year. "Shortly after the establishment of the State of Israel in 1948, Bernstein was invited by the new government to advise it on the establishment of its public services and to draw up plans for the office of state comptroller." Colleagues have commented that he was known to have later been frequently sought for advice on the structuring of Israel's growing administrative organizations.

== Controversies ==
In July 1959, at an American national exhibition in Moscow, Soviet authorities removed three books on Israel and Jewish subjects, including Bernstein's 1957 text The Politics of Israel: The First Decade of Statehood.

== Death ==
Bernstein and his wife, Sheva, died in the Helioplis Sheraton hotel fire, in Cairo, Egypt on March 1, 1990. The two had arrived in Cairo after his recent retirement from Georgetown University, planning to join a Smithsonian Institution-sponsored tour of the Red Sea the next day. They stayed on an upper floor of the luxury hotel. A fire starting in an attached tented restaurant and fanned by high winds consumed much of the 630 room hotel which had no fire alarms or sprinklers. It was later reported that they were overcome by smoke in an interior hallway.

== Publications ==
- Bernstein, Marver H. (1949). "Loyalty of Federal Employees in the United States". Public Administration. 27 (2): 100–107. doi:10.1111/j.1467-9299.1949.tb02674.x.
- American Democracy in Theory and Practice. New York: Rinehart and Co. 1951. doi:10.1017/S0003055400301654. (co-author)
- Bernstein, M. H. (1 March 1952). "The Scope of Public Administration". Political Research Quarterly. 5: 124–137. doi:10.1177/106591295200500109. S2CID 153333759.
- Bernstein, Marver H. (1953). "Political Ideas of Selected American Business Journals". The Public Opinion Quarterly. 17 (2). United States: Oxford University Press: 258–267. doi:10.1086/266459. JSTOR 2746280.
- Bernstein, Marver H. (May 1954). "The Politics of Adjudication". The Journal of Politics. 16 (2): 299–323. doi:10.2307/2126030. JSTOR 2126030. S2CID 153802913.
- Bernstein, M. H. (1955). Regulating Business by Independent Commission. Princeton University Press. ISBN 0691650381.
- The Politics of Israel: The First Decade of Statehood. Greenwood Press. 1957. ISBN 0837120365.
- The Job of the Federal Executive. Brookings Institution. 1958. ISBN 0313252734.
- Bernstein, Marver H. (1959). "Israel's Capacity to Govern". World Politics. 11 (3): 399–417. doi:10.2307/2009200. JSTOR 2009200. S2CID 153610997.
- Essentials of American Democracy (6th ed.). Holt, Rinehart and Winston, Inc. 1 Jan 1971. ISBN 0030857333. (Co-author)
- Bernstein, Marver H. (July 1972). "Ethics in government: The problems in perspective". National Civic Review. 61 (7): 341–347. doi:10.1002/ncr.4100610707.
- American Democracy (8th ed.). Dryden Press. 1 January 1977. ISBN 0030894905. (co-author)
- "Coping with Turbulence: The First Two Years of the National Unity Government under Peres". Israeli National Security: Political Actors and Perspectives. New York: Greenwood Press. 1988. ed. Bernard Reich and Gershon R. Kieval

== Family ==
Bernstein was married in 1944 to the former Sheva Rosenthal, a native of St. Paul, Minnesota, and graduate of the University of Minnesota. Ms. Rosenthal was an economist who was active in Hadassah, the League of Women Voters and other social services organizations.

== Memorials ==
After his death, Georgetown University established the Marver H. Bernstein Symposium on Governmental Reform, which took place annually until 2017. It began again in 2023. The Symposium has drawn some of the most prominent figures in American politics, government, and journalism.

- The first symposium speaker in 1994 was then Vice President Al Gore, who spoke on “The new job of the Federal Executive” and directly referenced Bernstein's important research on this topic.
- In 1997, United States Senator Daniel Patrick Moynihan spoke on Secrecy as Government Regulation.
- In 1998, the speaker was American journalist, lawyer, and TV moderator Tim Russert.
- In 2014, the speaker was United States Supreme Court Associate Justice Sonia Sotomayor.
- In 2017, United States Supreme Court Associate Justice Ruth Bader Ginsburg spoke on the need for improving the confirmation process, “recall[ing] the ‘collegiality’ and ‘civility’ of her own nomination and confirmation...”
- In 2023, United States Senator Jon Ossoff, an alumnus of Georgetown, discussed the importance of bipartisanship in the legislative branch.

As a bequeath:

[the Georgetown University] library received from his estate...2,700 volumes and 1,000 unbound journals and government documents. The books represent a scholarly library of works on Israel and the Middle East, political science, government, economics, urban studies, history and biography, many of them now out of print. The Middle East collection contains most of the significant scholarly works in the field published in the English language during the past thirty years.

In approximately 2005, the Princeton University School of International and Public Affairs (SPIA) (formerly the Woodrow Wilson School) established the Bernstein Gallery in Robertson Hall. The gallery “presents art exhibitions to stimulate thinking about contemporary policy issues and to enable understanding the world beyond the power of words. Each year, six curated shows are presented... and...are complemented by ...panel discussions with experts from Princeton University, the School and outside organizations." The exhibits are "...Integrated with the School's multidisciplinary approach...to enhance the impact of the course curriculum and to deepen people's commitment to the ideals of public service."
