= Vicki Khuzami =

American illustrator, muralist and scenic painter

Vicki Khuzami (born in Brooklyn, New York) and is an American illustrator, muralist and scenic painter. She has illustrated book covers, designed holiday store windows and painted murals at the United States Capitol, for corporations and private individuals.

== Background ==
Khuzami is Lebanese-American and the daughter of professional ballroom dancers. Her brothers are Richard Khuzami, a musician and Robert Khuzami, enforcement director of the U.S. Securities and Exchange Commission. She received a Bachelor of Fine Arts, magna cum laude from SUNY New Paltz and also studied at Parsons School of Design and the School of Visual Arts. After college, she went to India and assisted in making a documentary film. While in Asia, she traveled in Nepal, Sri Lanka and Thailand. She also went to Japan, where she studied art and architecture.

Khuzami identifies her father as a significant force in her life, nurturing her bohemian spirit and teaching her and her brothers about contemporary issues. He said there were five key principles of happiness and identified them as "health, integrity and the pursuit of truth, development of one's talents, human relationships and independence".

== Professional career ==
Khuzami began working in New York City as a restorer of 19th-century paintings. After a couple of years, she began illustrating book covers for Dell Publishing, Simon & Schuster and others. She then began working at Evergreene Painting Studios, and in 1993, was in the group of artists who created new murals for the Capitol Building in Washington, D.C. and she helped to research, design and create many of the historical scenes on the ceiling of the western corridor of the U.S. House of Representatives.

Khuzami opened her own studio in 1995. She has produced murals for the New York Botanical Garden, Disneyland Tokyo, Bloomingdale's, the National Park Service, Kirin Brewery Company and for author Tom Robbins. In 1999, she was featured painting a mural on Home and Garden Television in an episode of "Modern Masters".

In 2001, she taught mural painting at The New School and did a mural called "Bohemorama", a painting of Greenwich Village's most famous bohemians and artists, including Edgar Allan Poe, Mark Twain, Bob Dylan, Miles Davis, Charlie Parker and Andy Warhol. In 2008, she designed the holiday windows for Bloomingdale's flagship store in New York City.
