= Public interest theory =

The public interest theory of regulation claims that government regulation acts to protect and benefit the public.

The public interest is "the welfare or well-being of the general public" and society. Regulation in this context means the employment of legal instruments (laws and rules) for the implementation of policy objectives.

Public interest theory competes for acceptance with public choice and regulatory capture in explaining regulation and its effects on public welfare.

== Markets and regulation ==
In modern economies, resources are allocated mainly by markets. Ideally under certain market theories, this allocation is meant to be optimal, but the conditions necessary to achieve that optimum are frequently not present. In that case resource allocation is suboptimal, creating the possibility that some intervention could improve things. One such intervention is government regulation. Others include taxes/subsidies and improvements to education/infrastructure.

Public interest theory claims that government regulation can improve markets, compensating for imperfect competition, unbalanced market operation, missing markets and undesirable market outcomes. Regulation can facilitate, maintain, or imitate markets.

Public interest theory is a part of welfare economics. It emphasizes that regulation should maximize social welfare and that regulation should follow a cost/benefit analysis to determine whether the increased social welfare outweighs the regulatory cost.

The following costs can be distinguished:

- Formulation and implementation costs
- Maintenance/enforcement costs
- Compliance costs
- Dead weight costs

== History ==
Public interest theory developed from classical conceptions of representative democracy and the role of government. It presumes confidence in the civil service. According to Max Weber civil servants are to carry out their particular role or task within a strictly ordered and specialized hierarchy. The combination of merit and tenure with unambiguous norms of impartiality support rational decision making. Individual decisions must either be subsumed under norms or balance means and ends.

In this conception, regulatory administration neither adds to nor subtracts from the policy adopted by lawmakers. The public interest may be served, but it must be served exactly as prescribed by lawmakers. Bureaucracy must not usurp the public interest, nor does it protect against its usurpation by particular interests seeing regulation as a vehicle for their own concerns. It states that regulation pursues some conception of the general good

While there is no pointed origin or categorical articulation of public interest theory, its notions can be traced back to Pigou; related to his analysis of externalities and welfare economics. This theory was prevalent, especially during the New Deal era.

Starting in the 1960s, economists of the Chicago school began critiquing the assumption of benevolent regulators, proposing counter theories, like public choice theory, which asserts that instead of pursuing the public interest, regulators act to protect their own positions. The theory of regulatory capture asserts that regulated entities influence regulators to benefit themselves, particularly at the expense of less sophisticated competitors, who are less able to influence the regulators.

Regulation, according to public interest theory, is assumed to benefit society as a whole rather than particular vested interests. The regulators are considered to represent society's interest rather than the private interests of regulators or particular regulated entities.

== Example ==
One application of public interest theory can be seen in an investigation in Sweden and the energy market:

We test the public interest and regulatory capture hypotheses, in the context of the Swedish electricity market, by studying the factors influencing the Swedish Energy Agency's decision to replace decision-makers it employs to hear customer complaints against utilities.
We test if the regulator's decision to retain, or replace, the decision-maker, following a sequence of decisions, can be explained by whether the customer or utility is being favored by the civil servant. Based on whether the regulator replaces the decision maker that it has the power to appoint, we draw inferences about what theory can best explain the behavior of the regulator. The regulator can choose to favor the customer. To do so would be consistent with the fact that the primary objective of the electricity market reform in 1996 was to put the onus on the Swedish Energy Agency to provide stronger consumer protection against market abuse by the electricity utilities. On the other hand, the regulator might be captured because the utilities have more financial and legal resources and they have a well-established lobby organization which the customers do not have. It is not clear, therefore, whether customers or utilities have benefited most during the post-reform regulation.

== Criticism ==
The most critiqued aspects of public interest theory are its ambiguity, and its inability to recognize/address imperfections in the regulatory regime. Further, it provides no framework for assessing when and if the public interest has been served.

Another issue is whether the integrity of the regulatory function is maintainable over time. When a regulatory regime is established, typically during a period of regulatory reform, the regulatory body is subject to close scrutiny from the government and the public. With the passage of time, attention turns to other issues. Without this scrutiny the body becomes more susceptible to regulatory capture and or the contradictions exposed by public choice theory.
