= Richard H. Walker =

American lawyer (born 1950)

- Born: 1950 (age 75–76); Wilmington, Delaware, U.S.
- Education: Trinity College (BA); Temple University Beasley School of Law (JD)
- Occupation: Lawyer

Richard H. Walker (born 1950) is an American lawyer. He is former general counsel of corporate and investment banking at Deutsche Bank and former director of the United States Securities and Exchange Commission (SEC), Division of Enforcement, where he worked for ten years. Before working at the SEC, Walker was a partner at Cadwalader, Wickersham & Taft.

== Biography ==
Walker was born in Wilmington, Delaware in 1950. He received a Bachelor of Arts degree in 1972 from Trinity College in Hartford, Connecticut and was a member of Phi Beta Kappa. He received his J.D. cum laude from Temple Law School and was editor-in-chief of the Temple Law Quarterly.

Walker's first job after law school was as a law clerk to Chief Judge Collins J. Seitz of the U.S. Court of Appeals for the Third Circuit. In 1976, he began working at Cadwalader, Wickersham & Taft as an associate, becoming a partner in 1983. While working there, he met Robert Khuzami, who joined the firm as an associate.

Walker worked at the SEC for ten years, first as regional director of the SEC's northeast regional office from 1991 to 1996, then as general counsel from 1996 to 1998, when he became the director of enforcement. He was involved with financial fraud cases brought against W.R. Grace, Livent, Cendant, Microstrategy, Sunbeam Products, Arthur Andersen and PricewaterhouseCoopers. He also established the SEC's internet enforcement program.

He orchestrated the SEC's involvement in undercover sting operations including Operation Thorcon and Operation Uptick, which resulted in more than 100 people being charged with securities fraud. While at the SEC, he worked under chairmen Arthur Levitt and Richard C. Breeden and was awarded for his work in a successful appeal in U.S. v. O'Hagan, which upheld the misappropriation theory of insider trading.

On October 1, 2001, just days before Deutsche Bank began listing its shares on the New York stock exchange, it announced that Walker would be joining the bank as general counsel of its corporate and investment banking division, the bank's largest division. In 2004, Khuzami, then working as a prosecutor in the U.S. attorney's office in Manhattan's Southern District of New York, was hired by Walker to come to Deutsche Bank. Walker later recommended Khuzami for the job of SEC enforcement director.
