= Walter Stachnik =

SEC Inspector General

Inspector General for the Securities and Exchange Commission
- In office March 12, 1989 – August 6, 2007
- President: George H. W. Bush; Bill Clinton; George W. Bush
- Preceded by: Position established
- Succeeded by: Nelson Egbert (Acting)

Personal details
- Education: University of Wisconsin, Madison (BA, MPA)

Walter J. Stachnik is a former Inspector General of the U.S. Securities and Exchange Commission (SEC). Stachnik was the first Inspector General of the SEC, having been in the position from the time the job was created in 1989. He retired in 2007, after 30 years in government service.
