= Gary Lynch =

American attorney

- Born: America
- Education: University of Delaware (B.A. 1965); Princeton University (Ph.D. 1968)
- Known for: Long-term potentiation; theta burst stimulation (TBS); ampakines; synaptic plasticity
- Awards: ISI Thomson Most Cited Researcher (since 2002)
- Scientific career
- Fields: Neuroscience; synaptic plasticity; learning and memory
- Workplaces: University of California, Irvine
- Website: UCI faculty profile

Gary Lynch is a neuroscientist at University of California, Irvine School of Medicine. His lab studies memory. He received his PhD from Princeton University in 1968; his PhD advisor was Byron Campbell. At UCI, his lab began research involving the role of long-term potentiation in memory. His biography is profiled in the book 101 Theory Drive. He is Professor Above Scale in the Department of Psychiatry and Human Behavior at UC Irvine, with a joint appointment in the Department of Anatomy and Neurobiology. He has published over 550 scientific papers and is recognized as one of the most cited authors in neuroscience, with an h-index of 146. He is the co-inventor of ampakines, a class of cognition-enhancing drugs that positively modulate AMPA-type glutamate receptors.

== Education ==
Lynch received his B.A. in Psychology from the University of Delaware in 1965 and his Ph.D. from Princeton University in 1968, where his doctoral advisor was Byron Campbell.

== Career ==
At UCI, his lab began research involving the role of long-term potentiation (LTP) in memory.

Lynch holds the title of Professor Above Scale in the Department of Psychiatry and Human Behavior at UC Irvine, with a joint appointment in the Department of Anatomy and Neurobiology. He joined the UCI faculty in 1969.

In 1986, Lynch and John Larson invented theta burst stimulation (TBS), a stimulation protocol that mimics the theta rhythm of the hippocampus. TBS became the standard protocol for inducing long-term potentiation (LTP) in neuroscience research and has become a significant topic in its own right, with recent applications in stimulation treatments for depression.

Lynch is the co-inventor of ampakines, a novel class of cognition-enhancing drugs that positively modulate AMPA-type glutamate receptors to enhance synaptic transmission. Ampakines have been investigated for the treatment of cognitive deficits in conditions including Alzheimer’s disease, schizophrenia, and sleep deprivation.

Lynch co-founded three technology companies: Cortex Pharmaceuticals (NASDAQ: CORX, now RespireRx), Synaptics (NASDAQ: SYNA), and Thuris Corporation.

He holds 25 patents related to memory-enhancing compounds and synaptic modulators, including patents on ampakine compounds, methods for detecting neuronal activity in brain tissue, and treatments for neurodegeneration.

== Research contributions ==
Lynch’s research has focused on the mechanisms of long-term potentiation (LTP), synaptic plasticity, and their roles in learning and memory. His laboratory has studied the structural and molecular changes that occur at synapses during LTP, the regulation of AMPA and NMDA receptor function, and the development of pharmacological approaches to enhance cognitive function. With Michel Baudry, he is closely associated with the hypothesis that LTP and memory encoding are due to an enlargement of the postsynaptic pool of AMPA-type glutamate receptors (Lynch & Baudry, The biochemistry of memory: A new and specific hypothesis. Science, 1984).

He is a Fellow of the Center for the Neurobiology of Learning and Memory (CNLM) at UC Irvine, which he co-founded in 1983.

== Advisory roles ==
Lynch has served as an elected Councilor of the Society for Neuroscience and as a member of the Executive Advisory Board of the Jet Propulsion Laboratory (JPL)/NASA.

== Selected publications ==
Lynch has published over 550 scientific papers with an h-index of 146. His published work has been cited over 73,000 times. He was named an ISI Thomson Most Cited Researcher in 2002.

Lynch G and Granger R (2008). Big Brain: The Origins and Future of Human Intelligence. Palgrave Macmillan, New York.

His biography is profiled in the book 101 Theory Drive by Terry McDermott (2010).
