= Arthur Samberg =

American businessman and philanthropist (1941–2020)

- Born: Arthur Jay Samberg; February 6, 1941; The Bronx, New York City, U.S.
- Died: July 14, 2020 (aged 79); Ossining, New York, U.S.
- Education: Massachusetts Institute of Technology; Stanford University; Columbia Business School
- Occupation: Businessman
- Known for: CEO, president and chairman of Pequot Capital Management

Arthur Jay Samberg (February 6, 1941 – July 14, 2020) was an American businessman and philanthropist. He founded Pequot Capital Management and served as the chief executive officer, president and chairman of the company. Samberg's flagship Pequot fund, started in 1986, netted 17.8 percent over the life of the fund. After the fund closed, he managed his family office through Hawkes Financial. He was also a significant contributor to several hospitals and universities, including New York-Presbyterian Hospital and his alma maters Columbia Business School and the Massachusetts Institute of Technology.

== Early life and education ==
Arthur Jay Samberg was born on February 6, 1941, to Rena Samberg, a clerical assistant, and Philip Samberg, an electrician. He grew up in the Bronx, four blocks from the Yankee Stadium. When he was eight years old, his family, including his younger brother, moved to Tenafly, New Jersey. Arthur grew to 6 feet 4 inches (1.93 metres) and loved playing basketball. He tried out for his high school basketball team every year and finally qualified in his senior year.

The 1957 launch of Sputnik 1 had made a large impression on him. After graduating high school in 1958, he studied Aeronautics and Astronautics at the Massachusetts Institute of Technology (MIT). He earned his undergraduate degree in 1962 and worked at Lockheed Missiles and Space Company for three years as a satellite control systems engineer in Palo Alto, California. While at Lockheed, Samberg worked on the Polaris missile and, at the same time, he earned his M.S. from Stanford University but came to believe he would not make a good engineer. He became interested in the stock market and enrolled in the business school at Columbia University, earning his M.B.A. in 1967.

== Career ==
Samberg began his career in the investment industry as an analyst at Kidder, Peabody & Co. in New York City. In 1970, he was the first professional hire at the start-up investment management company Weiss, Peck & Greer. He later assumed a partner role, and he additionally served on the management committee during his last five years with the firm. During his 15-year tenure, Weiss, Peck & Greer grew to $8 billion in assets under management.

In 1985, he became a founder and the president of Dawson–Samberg Capital Management, Inc., in Southport, Connecticut, where the following year they established the first Pequot hedge fund. In its first year, the fund lost 20 percent before becoming successful in subsequent years. In 1999, Samberg spun out his funds into the newly formed Pequot Capital Management, where Daniel C. Benton joined him as co-founder. By 2001, Pequot was the largest hedge fund globally with $15 billion in assets under management. That year, he and Benton decided to split their hedge fund, each taking $7.5 billion in assets. Samberg's firm kept Pequot as its name while Benton formed Andor Capital Management.

Since joining in 2003, Samberg was a life member of the MIT Corporation and a member of its executive committee. He also served as chairman of the MIT Investment Management Company, sat on the board of the MIT Energy Initiative, and was on the dean's advisory council of the MIT School of Science.

In 2004, the SEC began an investigation of Pequot's trading in the securities, including trades by funds for which Samberg was the portfolio manager. The SEC also involved the U.S. Attorney's Office for the Southern District of New York. An area of focus of the investigations was Samberg's hiring of David Zilkha, who previously had been employed by Microsoft Corporation, and subsequent trading in Microsoft securities in 2001. In late 2006, the investigation was closed without filing any charges or taking other action, but was reopened in late December 2008. In May 2010, Pequot and Samberg resolved this matter by agreeing to a settlement whereby, without admitting or denying the allegations, Pequot and Samberg consented to be permanently enjoined from violating the anti-fraud provisions of the federal securities law and to pay disgorgement, prejudgment interest, and civil money penalties.

As of 2008, Pequot managed approximately $5 billion in assets. In 2009, Samberg decided to shut down Pequot Capital. He continued to manage his family's holdings through Hawkes Financial. His family firm was a lead investor in TAE Technologies, a company working towards a new source of clean energy, and Samberg served as chairman of the company.

== Philanthropy ==
Samberg and his wife, Rebecca, co-founded the Samberg Family Foundation to "support various health, education, and Jewish causes in the New York area and nationally". The Sambergs were a founding contributor of Birthright Israel. Their foundation has also made significant contributions to several organizations including Avodah, College Summit, Harlem Children's Zone, Health Leads, and Peer Health Exchange. He was a board member of the Children's Hospital of New York, College Summit, and the New York Genome Center. He also served on the national board of directors of the Network For Teaching Entrepreneurship and as senior chair of the Wall Street and Financial Services Division of the United Jewish Appeal. Arthur was a trustee and member of the executive and investment committees of New York-Presbyterian Hospital. He supported the arts as one of the directors of Jazz at Lincoln Center and chairman emeritus of the Jacob Burns Film Center. In the early 2000s, he also served on the board of overseers of the Center for Jewish History.

In 2006, Samberg and fellow alumni Russell L. Carson and Henry R. Kravis together donated a total of $45 million to Columbia Business School; out of the total contribution, $25 million was solely donated by Samberg. In 2012, Samberg and his wife gave $25 million to New York-Presbyterian/Morgan Stanley Children's Hospital. The donation made possible the Samberg Scholars in Children's Health Program, an initiative to recruit and train as many as 40 top scholars in pediatric medicine. The Sambergs also established a scholarship at MIT and funded a building at MIT, the Samberg Conference Center. In 2016, Samberg donated $50 million to Blue Meridian Partners, a collaboration led the Edna McConnell Clark Foundation planning to invest at least a billion dollars over the following decade towards proven charities to benefit children. The Sambergs are also supporters of the Ossining Children's Center in Ossining, New York. In July 2019, the center broke ground on the Rebecca and Arthur Samberg Building, a 27,000-square-foot (2,500 m^{2}) facility for the education of children under 12 years old.

== Personal life ==
Samberg continued to play basketball as an adult. He installed a basketball court next to the trading floor at Pequot. As a celebration of his 59th birthday, Samberg climbed Mount Kilimanjaro in 2000. A few months later, while playing doubles tennis, he collapsed with a pain in his chest. He was diagnosed with a birth defect in his aorta and underwent emergency surgery. It took him six months to get back to work.

Samberg died of leukemia at his home on July 14, 2020, at the age of 79. He was married to Rebecca Samberg for 56 years until his death. He is also survived by their three children, Jeff, Joe, and Laura, and seven grandchildren.
