= Robert Khuzami =

Former SEC Enforcement Director and former United States federal prosecutor

Robert S. Khuzami
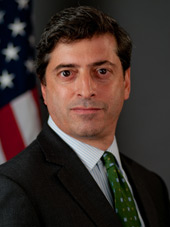
- Official SEC photo
- Born: August 2, 1956 (age 70)
- Education: University of Rochester (BA); Boston University (JD)
- Occupation: Attorney
- Employer: United States Department of Justice
- Title: Deputy United States Attorney for the Southern District of New York

Robert S. Khuzami (Arabic: روبرت خوزمي; born August 2, 1956) was the Deputy U.S. Attorney for the United States Attorney's Office for the Southern District of New York until March 22, 2019. He previously was a United States federal prosecutor and Assistant United States Attorney for the office, and a former director of the Division of Enforcement of the U.S. Securities and Exchange Commission. He was previously a partner at law firm Kirkland & Ellis. and general counsel of Deutsche Bank AG.

== Education and early employment ==
Khuzami was born in Brooklyn and grew up in Rochester, New York. His parents were professional ballroom dancers of Lebanese descent and had a dancing school.

He attended Rush-Henrietta Senior High School, graduating in 1974. After taking a few years off after high school, Khuzami enrolled in college, first studying at the State University of New York at Geneseo, then transferring to the University of Rochester where he was elected to Phi Beta Kappa and graduated magna cum laude in 1979. He received a Juris Doctor degree in 1983 from Boston University School of Law. From 1983 to 1984, he was a law clerk for John R. Gibson of the U.S. Court of Appeals for the Eighth Circuit in Kansas City, Missouri and then went to work at Cadwalader, Wickersham & Taft as a litigation associate.

== US Attorney's Office, Southern District of New York ==
=== Assistant United States Attorney ===
Khuzami was a prosecutor in the U.S. Attorney's Office in Manhattan's Southern District of New York from 1991 to 2002. From 1999 to 2002, he was chief of that office's Securities and Commodities Fraud Task Force, where he prosecuted complex securities and white-collar crime, including insider trading, Ponzi schemes, accounting and financial statement fraud, organized crime infiltration of the securities markets, and initial public offering and investment adviser fraud. Among other cases, the Task Force under Khuzami was responsible for "Operation Uptick," a one-year joint DOJ-FBI-SEC-NASD undercover operation in which a "front" investment advisory business was set up and located in premises that were bugged with court-authorized eavesdropping devices. As a result, 120 persons were arrested on a variety of securities fraud charges in a single day, including 10 members of the Bonanno and Colombo organized crime families, a former New York City police detective, 57 securities brokers, 12 stock promoters, 30 corporate officers, directors and other insiders, two accountants, a hedge fund manager, and others. This was the largest number of defendants ever arrested at one time on securities fraud related charges and one of the largest number ever arrested in a criminal case of any kind.

One of his cases involved Patrick R. Bennett, founder of Bennett Funding Group, who was charged with running a pyramid scheme and cheating 12,000 investors of $600 million. Bennett's first trial, in March 1999, resulted in a hung jury and the judge, Thomas P. Griesa, declared a mistrial. Khuzami announced his intention to continue legal pursuit of Bennett on all counts for which the jury did not reach a decision. A second jury failed to reach a decision on 11 securities and mail fraud charges and a second judge, John S. Martin, Jr., declared a mistrial on the unresolved charges in June 1999. Bennett, who admitted to seven counts of lying to SEC prosecutors but otherwise maintains his innocence, was described by his lawyers as an inept businessman overwhelmed by an expanding company. In a practice then legal, the judge used his discretion to convict Bennett of stock fraud and money laundering. He was not convicted of running a Ponzi scheme, the main charge. Bennett was also ordered to forfeit $109 million, although he filed for bankruptcy in 1996 and was declared indigent and his lawyers were court-appointed. He was sentenced to 22 years, later extended to 30 because his then-wife did not turn over assets to repay investors.

Khuzami was selected by then-U.S. Attorney Mary Jo White to work with Andrew C. McCarthy and Patrick Fitzgerald in the prosecution of the "Blind Sheikh", Omar Abdel-Rahman, a career-changing case. At the time, the largest terrorism trial in U.S. history, ten defendants were convicted of operating an international terrorist organization responsible for the February 1993 World Trade Center bombing and who planned simultaneous bombing attacks on Federal Bureau of Investigation (FBI) New York headquarters, the United Nations and the Lincoln and Holland Tunnels. Khuzami also prosecuted those accused of assassinating Meir Kahane, and plotting the murders of Hosni Mubarak of Egypt and the Secretary General of the United Nations. Khuzami also supervised some of the initial investigation in New York following the September 11, 2001 attacks.

== Deutsche Bank - Americas ==
In 2002, Khuzami was hired by Richard H. Walker to work at Deutsche Bank in New York as Global Head of Litigation and Regulatory Investigations, where he oversaw litigation and regulatory investigations. In 2004, he was promoted to serve as General Counsel for the Americas, where he supervised more than 100 lawyers. From 2002 to 2004, he headed their global litigation and regulatory investigations. He stayed at the bank until 2009. Walker, who had met Khuzami at Cadwalader, Wickersham & Taft when Walker was a partner there, later recommended him for the enforcement job at the SEC, a job he had once held himself.

== SEC Division of Enforcement ==
In 2009 Khuzami was appointed by U.S. Securities and Exchange Commission (SEC) Chairman Mary Schapiro to succeed Linda Chatman Thomsen after the SEC had come under public criticism for failing to detect Bernard Madoff's Ponzi scheme. His appointment was controversial because of his employment at Deutsche Bank, a global investment firm which did business with Goldman Sachs. He was portrayed as an outsider by some but had 11 years' experience as a federal prosecutor.

Inheriting a demoralized agency ridiculed as ineffective, Khuzami began a broad reorganization of the top-heavy Enforcement Division. He left top salaries in place, but forced administrators back into investigations. He eliminated a layer of management. and formed national units to concentrate expertise in five areas. He created a new system to collect, organize, investigate and data mine tips and complaints, tens of thousands of which are received by the SEC every year. The new units focus on probes into investment advisers, investment companies, hedge funds and private equity funds; financial derivatives and other "complex financial products;" market abuses, such as large-scale insider trading and market manipulations; municipal securities and public pension funds; and violations of the Foreign Corrupt Practices Act. Khuzami obtained Commission approval to delegate to senior staff the authority to issue subpoenas without preapproval, and created the first-ever Office of the chief operating officer (COO) for the Division to handle IT, project management, budget, HR and similar issues that previously had been handled by lawyers. Khuzami also hired industry experts, non-lawyers with genuine market expertise such as portfolio managers, traders, operations personnel, structurers, and risk managers who "know where the rocks are and what is buried beneath them." Khuzami adopted these changes to make the Division smarter and quicker, noting "whether you are dealing with terrorism or securities fraud, it is better to be in the prevention business than the cleanup business. We want to be able to detect wrongdoing earlier in the cycle and minimize harm to investors." Khuzami also established a new Cross Border Working Group, a proactive, risk-based initiative focusing on U.S. companies whose substantial foreign operations might have accounting or auditing problems, and a MicroCap Fraud Working Group to address the long-standing problem of fraud in connection with offering and trading of microcap securities, otherwise known as "penny stocks". Khuzami's initiatives are the largest restructuring of the Enforcement Division in its 40-year history.

As part of the restructuring, Khuzami also initiated a cooperating witness program designed to incentivize persons with knowledge of securities laws violations to assist SEC investigations. He told The Washington Post, "There is no substitute for the insider's view into fraud and misconduct that only cooperating witnesses can provide. That type of evidence can expand our ability to conduct our investigations more swiftly, and to act quickly to file charges, freeze assets and protect investors." According to Khuzami, "The program is designed to encourage 'insiders' and others to provide high quality evidence of wrongdoing early so we can minimize investor loss and take action against the organizers, leaders, and managers of unlawful schemes."

=== Enforcement Division performance under Khuzami ===
In fiscal year 2011, the Enforcement Division filed 735 actions, an 8.6% increase over FY 2010 and more than any other year in SEC history. It also obtained $2.8 billion in penalties and disgorgement. One commentator noted that despite budget and other restraints, the SEC has recently "had a string of successes" and has made progress "despite every disadvantage." The particular cases are assembled and summarized in the SEC's list of major enforcement actions for the years 2009–2012.

The following year, fiscal year 2012, the Enforcement Division filed 734 enforcement actions. It also obtained orders requiring the payment of more than $3.0 billion in penalties and disgorgement for the benefit of harmed investors, an 11% increase over the amount ordered the previous year. As Chairman Schapiro stated at the time, "We've now brought more enforcement actions in each of the last two years than ever before including some of the most complex cases we've ever seen." This level of performance came two years after Khuzami implemented a reorganization of the Division's history.

In fiscal year 2012, the SEC also made its first whistleblower award under its new whistleblower authority authorized under the Dodd-Frank Act.

=== Financial crisis-related cases ===
As of November 2012, the Enforcement Division during Khuzami's tenure has charged 129 entities and individuals involving wrongdoing generally associated with the financial crisis, including: (a) concealing from investors risks, terms and improper pricing of collateral debt obligations, residential mortgage-backed securities, asset-backed commercial paper and other complex structured products; (b) misleading risk and accounting disclosures to shareholders of public companies in mortgage and mortgage-related businesses; and (c) concealing the extent of risky mortgage-related and other high-risk investments in mutual funds and other financial products. In these cases, 57 CEOs, CFOs and other senior corporate officers have been charged and more than $2.6 billion of monetary relief has been ordered or agreed to, most of which has been or is in the process of being returned to harmed investors.

Khuzami served as co-chair of the Securities and Commodities Fraud Working Group of President Obama's federal-state Financial Fraud Enforcement Task Force (FFETF), created in 2009 to prosecute securities and other fraud arising out of the financial crisis. He was also selected to serve as one of five co-chairs of an additional working group – the Residential Mortgage-Backed Securities (RMBS) Working Group – formed in January 2012 under the FFETF to focus specifically on fraud in the creation, issuance and sale of residential mortgage-backed securities. Other co-chairs of the RMBS Working Group include New York Attorney General Eric Schneiderman. Since formation of the RMBS Working Group, the SEC has filed cases against two major investment firms ordered to pay a combined total of almost $420 million for misleading investors in connection with hundreds of residential mortgage backed securities.

=== Insider trading cases ===
From October 2009 through November 2012, the Enforcement Division filed 168 total insider trading actions, the most in SEC history for any three-year period. In these actions, the SEC has charged 410 individuals and entities for illegal trading totaling nearly $900 million in illicit profit. These cases include those involving Galleon, expert networks, Raj Rajaratnam and Rajat Gupta. (See the SEC's list of major enforcement actions.) In addition, Khuzami embraced the use of sophisticated data analysis to identify patterns of suspicious trading and other misconduct from among the voluminous amount of tips and complaints that the SEC receives each year.

=== Controversies ===
A former SEC investigator, Gary Aguirre, who was fired after he questioned the SEC's failure to pursue an insider-trading case against John J. Mack, has been critical of the SEC's Cooperation Program initiated under Khuzami. Aguirre says it turns the SEC into a middleman between Wall Street firms and the Justice Department that will negotiate fines and circumvent a prison sentence. As Aguirre describes it, "First, the SEC and Wall Street player make an agreement on a fine that the player will pay to the SEC. Then the Justice Department commits itself to pass, so that the player knows he's 'safe.' Third, the player pays the SEC — and fourth, the player gets a pass from the Justice Department." Khuzami has been criticized for the new policy, which Republican Senator Chuck Grassley says, based on Aguirre's accusations, the SEC's own enforcement manual prohibits and the senator has asked for an explanation of Khuzami's remarks. Khuzami strongly disputed the concerns raised about the cooperation program in a February 18, 2011 letter addressed to Senator Grassley. He noted that the cooperation program was fully supported by all five SEC commissioners in a January 2010 policy statement, and in doing so recognized the value that cooperators bring to the enforcement program. He described how the DOJ (Department of Justice) makes its own decisions about how to resolve its cases, and has its own procedures and considerations for evaluating and handling potential cooperators, which they would not and could not delegate to the SEC. As such, Khuzami wrote that the cooperation initiative operates in complete accord with long-standing SEC practice and the guidance in its enforcement manual. The value of the cooperation program was recently underscored when Khuzami issued a public statement in connection with the AXA Rosenberg Group LLC case. In that case, a cooperating witness's assistance was credited with a quantitative hedge fund paying $217 million to harmed investors, a $27.5 million penalty, and the responsible manager, Barr M. Rosenberg, was given a lifetime bar from the industry.

A few months later, in August 2011, Matt Taibbi reported that for two decades, the SEC had been "systematically destroying records of its preliminary investigations once they [were] closed," making it harder and less likely that Wall Street crimes would be investigated and ultimately prosecuted. On August 17, 2011, Senator Grassley again wrote to the SEC to address a whistleblower's evidence of document destruction. Khuzami said Shapiro asked him to reply to questions raised by Grassley regarding the destruction of documents. In his reply, he claimed that investigations had not been hampered. Khuzami noted that this policy was not applied to SEC investigations, but only to "pre-investigation inquiries," which are simply a "quick look at readily available information in order to determine whether an [actual] investigation should be opened." Khuzami said that the unavailability of documents in this limited category of inquiries was unlikely to impact an actual investigation because: (i) the SEC retained key information concerning such inquiries in a searchable, electronic database dated from 1998, which assists staff members in "connecting the dots" between present and past inquiries; (ii) that since 2003, these inquiries were either closed or converted to an "investigation" after only 60 days, a very short period during which it is unlikely that significant materials had been obtained and/or could not be duplicated; and (iii) SEC staff were prohibited from issuing subpoenas for testimony or documents during these limited inquiries, and thus documents obtained were from publicly available sources and could be retrieved. According to The Wall Street Journal, Grassley was unimpressed. He said in a statement, "It doesn't make sense that an agency responsible for investigations would want to get rid of potential evidence." The statement continued, "If these charges are true, the agency needs to explain why it destroyed documents, how many documents it destroyed over what time frame, and to what extent its actions were consistent with the law." He said, "The SEC's argument seems to rely on its claim that nothing significant was destroyed," but then noted that the claim cannot be verified, since the documents are no longer available. The Inspector General of the SEC conducted an investigation into the matter and concluded that (i) the policy in question had been in place since 1981; (ii) there was "no improper motive" behind the longstanding policy; and (iii) there was no evidence that particular investigations were hampered by the destruction of records, although they had not conducted an exhaustive audit or review."

== Kirkland & Ellis LLP ==
From August 2013 through January 2018, Khuzami was a partner in the Government and Internal Investigations Group in the New York and Washington DC offices of Kirkland & Ellis LLP. His practice focused on representing individuals and companies implicated in U.S. and foreign civil and criminal enforcement actions, as well as parallel class actions and civil litigation.

== Deputy US Attorney ==
On January 5, 2018 interim United States Attorney for the Southern District of New York Geoffrey Berman named Khuzami as Deputy US Attorney for Manhattan. In that new role, Khuzami was second-in-command of the Office's over 230 civil and criminal Assistant United States Attorneys who prosecute cases involving terrorism, public corruption, narcotics, organized and violent gang activity, civil rights, securities fraud and other misconduct. Due to the recusal of U.S. Attorney Berman, Khuzami became the Acting United States Attorney in charge of the case of United States v. Cohen, in which Michael Cohen the ex-counsel to President Donald Trump, was convicted of tax, bank fraud and campaign finance violations, the latter of which arose out of the payment of secret hush-money payments to two women as part of a "catch and kill" strategy designed to benefit the 2016 presidential campaign of President Trump. In connection with that case, Khuzami signed off on the April 2018 raid of Donald Trump lawyer Michael Cohen's home and office because Berman was recused from the case. Khuzami commuted from Washington D.C. to New York City while serving as Deputy U.S. Attorney, and left the position in March 2019 to return to his home and family in Washington D.C.

== Guggenheim Partners ==
On September 3, 2019, Khuzami joined financial services firm Guggenheim Partners as Managing Partner and Chief Legal Officer. Guggenheim has three primary business lines: a premier asset management and investor advisor business; a full-service investment banking and capital markets business; and insurance services.

== Revolving door ==
Khuzami resigned from his position as Director of Enforcement and ended his employment with the SEC in January 2013, after four years of service. In July 2013, he accepted a job at Kirkland & Ellis, a large Chicago-based corporate law firm, in its Washington, D.C. office. Khuzami is a partner in Kirkland's Government & Internal Investigations Practice Group. In their series called "Revolving Door", The New York Times said: "As a partner at Kirkland, Mr. Khuzami will represent some of the same corporations that the S.E.C. oversees. Critics say this revolving door — common at the S.E.C. — undermines the agency's independence and links it inextricably to Wall Street."

Khuzami has been profiled by OpenSecrets as a featured Revolver in its Revolving Door database.

== Political affiliation ==
While Khuzami was selected to serve as Enforcement Director by Mary Schapiro, the SEC Chairman appointed by Democratic President Barack Obama, he also spoke before the 2004 Republican National Convention on behalf of then-president George W. Bush for the extension of the Patriot Act. On April 28, 2005, he testified before the United States House of Representatives Subcommittee on Crime, Terrorism and Homeland Security in support of the reauthorization of the Patriot Act. He also donated a maximum individual contribution of $2,300 to the presidential campaign of John McCain.

== Recognition and awards ==
In 1996, Khuzami was awarded the Attorney General's Exceptional Service Award, which recognizes "extraordinary courage and voluntary risk of life in performing an act resulting in direct benefits to the Department of Justice or the nation." In 1997, he received the Federal Law Enforcement Foundation's Federal Prosecutor Award. In 2001, he received the Henry L. Stimson Award for Outstanding Public Service from the New York City Bar Association. In 2009, Khuzami was named by Ethisphere Magazine as No. 34 in the list of the year's "100 Most Influential People in Business Ethics." In October 2012, Worth identified him as No. 40 in "The 100 Most Powerful People in Finance." Khuzami delivered the 2019 Commencement Address to Boston University School of Law.
