= Linda Chatman Thomsen =

American lawyer and government official

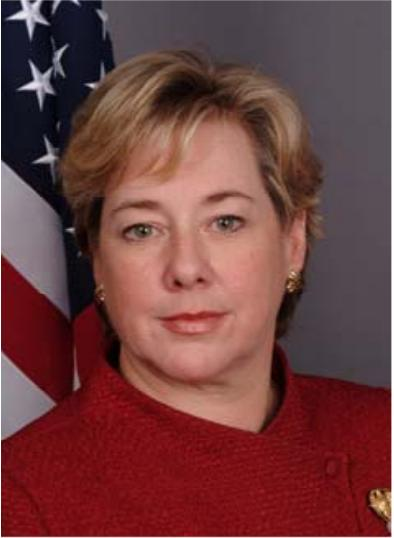
- Born: Linda Chatman Thomsen; April 1, 1954 (age 72); Long Valley, New Jersey, U.S.
- Education: Smith College (AB); Harvard Law School (JD)
- Occupation: Attorney

Linda Chatman Thomsen (born April 1, 1954) is an American attorney who was director of the Division of Enforcement for the U.S. Securities and Exchange Commission from 2005 until early 2009. Since arriving at the SEC in 1995, she worked under four SEC Chairmen: Arthur Levitt, Harvey Pitt, William H. Donaldson, and Christopher Cox. William Donaldson named her director of the Division of Enforcement on May 12, 2005. She is the first woman to serve as director of the Division of Enforcement. Thomsen is known for her role in the suits by the SEC against Enron and Martha Stewart, and for not having investigated Bernard Madoff. She succeeded Stephen M. Cutler. As of 2016, she has been a senior counsel at Davis Polk & Wardwell.

== Career ==
Thomsen received her A.B. from Smith College and her J.D. degree from Harvard Law School.

Before joining the staff of the Commission, she was in private practice at the law firm of Davis Polk & Wardwell in Washington, D.C., and New York, and also served as an Assistant United States Attorney for the District of Maryland. In November 2004, Thomsen was identified by writers and editors of the Wall Street Journal as one of fifty "Women to Watch".

=== Pequot Capital Management insider trading and firing of SEC investigator ===
In 2008 H. David Kotz, SEC inspector general, recommended that a disciplinary action be commenced against Thomsen due to her role in an insider trading investigation of prominent hedge fund Pequot Capital Management.

Kotz said he found there were 'serious questions' about the impartiality and fairness of the SEC's investigation of Pequot. A former SEC attorney who worked on the probe and was fired by the agency has alleged there was political interference in the probe by agency officials.

At the time, the SEC refused to take any enforcement action against Pequot, and it closed the case in 2006. It reopened the case after new information came to light. The hedge fund, which has now closed, denied any wrongdoing.

=== Madoff fraud ===
Leaders of the U.S. Securities and Exchange Commission (SEC) testified on February 4, 2009 before the United States House Committee on Financial Services subcommittee including Linda Thomsen SEC enforcement director, acting General Counsel Andy Vollmer, Andrew Donohue, Erik Sirri, and Lori Richards and Stephen Luparello of the Financial Industry Regulatory Authority (FINRA). The subject of the hearings was the question as to why the SEC had failed to act when Harry Markopolos, a private fraud investigator from Boston, alerted the SEC detailing his persistent and unsuccessful efforts to get the SEC to investigate Bernard L. Madoff, beginning in 1999. Vollmer claimed executive privilege in declining to answer some questions. Subcommittee chairman Paul Kanjorski asked Mr. Vollmer if he had obtained executive privilege from the U.S. attorney general. "No ... this is the position of the agency," said Vollmer. "Did the SEC instruct him not to respond to questions?" Mr. Kanjorski asked. Vollmer replied that it was the position of the Commission and that "the answer is no."

Thomsen and her colleagues testifying were accused by Representative Paul E. Kanjorski of "refusing to cooperate with a branch of government that could wipe their entire agency off the regulatory map, if necessary." Representative Gary L. Ackerman, went further saying: "We thought the enemy was Mr. Madoff. I think it is you."

=== Resignation from SEC ===
On February 9, 2009, five days after her appearance before the House subcommittee, and "after being blasted by critics for 'turning a blind eye' to tips that could have caught [Madoff] earlier," the SEC announced that Thomsen would resign from her position with no replacement identified and return to the private sector. The SEC announced Vollmer "plans to leave the Commission and return to the private sector," 9 days after Thomsen resigned. On July 9 The Washington Post announced that Richards would resign to "take on new challenges."

On April 13, 2009, the law firm, Davis Polk & Wardwell announced that Thomsen was returning to the firm as a partner in the Washington, D.C. office along with former Assistant to President Bush and White House Staff Secretary, Raul F. Yanes. The pair were recruited to work on white collar defense and government investigations and enforcement and increase the firm's financial regulatory practice.

=== Second instance of insider information ===
On November 30, 2009, Kotz released a semiannual report to Congress which discussed an investigation into a Senior Officer of the SEC who provided inside information to a former official, but did not name the officer. The New York Times identified the Senior Officer as Thomsen in an article on December 1, 2009, and that the former official was her former boss, Stephen Cutler of JPMorgan Chase, amid the bank's negotiations to buy Bear Stearns in March 2008. The inspector general said that while "Ms. Thomsen's communication with Mr. Cutler did not violate the SEC's policy on external communications, she should have taken other steps 'to avoid an appearance of impropriety stemming from the relationship.'"

=== Davis Polk ===
As of 2016, Linda Chatman Thomsen has been a senior counsel at law firm Davis Polk and represents defendants in SEC enforcement investigations and inquiries as well as other federal enforcement matters.

== Private life ==
Thomsen is married to Steuart Hill Thomsen, a partner in the law firm Sutherland Asbill & Brennan LLP.
