= Pequot Capital Management =

Former American hedge fund

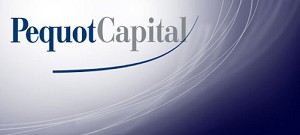
- Type: Private
- Industry: Hedge fund, Private Equity
- Founded: 1998
- Founder: Arthur J. Samberg
- Headquarters: Westport, Connecticut, United States
- Key people: John J. Mack (prior)

Pequot Capital Management was a multibillion-dollar hedge fund sponsor that closed in 2010. The firm's investment funds invested in a range of markets through a variety of strategies. The firm invested in public equities as well as private equity, venture capital, distressed securities, and various other fixed income securities. The firm closed in 2010 following allegations of insider trading.

== History ==
Pequot was founded in 1998 by Arthur J. Samberg. Based in Westport, Connecticut, United States, the firm had additional offices in San Francisco; New York City; Los Angeles; Greenbrae, Menlo Park; Wellesley; and London, United Kingdom.

In 2001 Pequot was reported to be the largest hedge fund globally with $15 billion in assets.

The firm's venture capital business, Pequot Ventures, spun off on June 30, 2008, into a separate company named FirstMark Capital. The company is based in New York City. FirstMark Capital received control of Pequot Ventures' existing venture capital portfolio assets.

=== Closure ===
In May 2009, the firm announced it was closing and, in an agreement with the Securities and Exchange Commission (SEC) on May 27, 2010, paid a $28 million settlement (consisting of $18 million in returned profit and $10 million in penalties). Samberg was barred from working as an investment adviser for alleged violations of insider trading involving Microsoft Corporation stock occurring in 2001 and a prospective new hire of the hedge fund, David Zilkha, from Microsoft. On May 28, 2009, with an insider trading investigation ongoing, Samberg wrote, "With the situation increasingly untenable for the firm and for me, I have concluded that Pequot can no longer stay in business." The SEC awarded $1 million to Glen Kaiser and Karen Kaiser for providing information leading to the settlement. One of the investigators of the case, Gary J. Aguirre, won a whistleblower case after being fired when he recommended that the investigation proceed further.
