= List of Ponzi schemes =

Fraudulent investment operations

This is a list of Ponzi schemes, fraudulent investment operations that pay out returns to investors from money paid in by subsequent investors rather than from any actual profit earned from the operation of a business.

== Historical examples ==
=== 19th century ===
==== 1860s ====
- Jacob Young, William Abrams, and Nancy Clem (see Cold Spring murders) ran what author Wendy Gamber argues, in her book The Notorious Mrs. Clem: Murder and Money in the Gilded Age, was the first-ever Ponzi scheme.
- In Munich, Germany, Adele Spitzeder founded the Spitzedersche Privatbank in 1869, promising an interest rate of 10 percent per month. By the time the scheme collapsed in 1872 it had become the largest case of fraud in 19th-century Bavaria.

==== 1870s ====
- Johann Baptist Placht ran a Ponzi scheme in Vienna from 1872 to 1873, claiming to invest in the stock market.
- Fraudster Sarah Howe opened a savings bank called Ladies' Deposit Company in 1878 meant to target unmarried women. She claimed that the bank worked in conjunction with a Quaker charity that wanted to help less privileged women. She promised high interest rates of eight percent per month. There was in fact no such charity. Howe was able to gain over 1,200 clients and US$500,000 in deposits before the Boston Daily Advertiser began outing the bank as a fraud in 1880. Howe was arrested, convicted, and served three years in prison. She attempted some other schemes after release in the 1880s, either being arrested, or fleeing to avoid it, eventually becoming a fortune teller until her death in 1892.
- In 1876, Baldomera Larra Wetoret began a Ponzi scheme after her husband abandoned her, resulting in her earning 22 million reals. She was later sentenced to 6 years in prison before being acquitted; married women were considered unable to legally make financial contracts without their husbands' permission.

==== 1880s ====
- In 1880, Ferdinand Ward entered into a brokerage partnership with James D. Fish, president of Marine National Bank, and former U.S. president Ulysses S. Grant. Grant, along with his sons, invested $200,000 of capital to the firm (Grant & Ward), and the financial operations were left entirely to Ward. After a number of bad investments erased the Grants' initial stake, Ward hid the loss by falsifying the firm's ledgers, and turned to a Ponzi scheme to attract new money and heighten the firm's reputation. Ward promised investors a 10% monthly profit, sometimes delivering up to 20%, while Grant shrugged off warnings that Ward's profits were suspicious. In May 1884, Marine National Bank became insolvent after major withdrawals from New York City's account. Ward had borrowed $1.3 million from the bank on nonexistent collateral, leaving the bank unable to cover the withdrawals and exposing Ward's fraud. Ward fled with the remainder of the firm's cash (including a $150,000 emergency loan from William H. Vanderbilt). After his arrest, he was sentenced to ten years in Sing Sing, serving six. Grant was ruined, although the sales of his posthumously published memoirs recovered his fortune and provided income for his widow. In total, Ward defrauded investors of nearly $17 million.

==== 1890s ====
- In 1899 William "520 Percent" Miller opened for business as the "Franklin Syndicate" in Brooklyn, New York. Miller promised 10% a week interest and exploited some of the main themes of Ponzi schemes such as customers re-investing the interest they made. He defrauded buyers out of $1 million and was sentenced to jail for 10 years. After he was pardoned, he opened a grocery store on Long Island. During the Ponzi investigation, Miller was interviewed by The Boston Post to compare his scheme to Ponzi's—the interviewer found them remarkably similar, but Ponzi's became more famous for taking in seven times as much money.

=== 20th century ===
==== 1920s ====
- Charles Ponzi became noted in 1920, in Boston, for his supposed arbitrage scheme, which ultimately proved to be merely a masquerade for paying off early investors with the deposits of later investors. The Ponzi Scheme is named after him. He claimed he would double investors' money in 90 days through a bizarre plan to buy and resell international postal-reply coupons. (These, according to the U.S. Postal Service, then operating as the Post Office Department, actually cannot be redeemed for cash.) Ponzi collected more than $8 million from about 30,000 investors in just seven months, before the scheme collapsed. He served 14 years in prison, was deported from the United States, and spent the rest of his life vainly seeking ways to provide restitution for the losses of his investors.

==== 1930s ====
- Ivar Kreuger, a Swedish businessman known as the "match king", built a Ponzi scheme, defrauding investors based on the supposedly fantastic profitability and ever-expanding nature of his match monopolies. The scheme soon collapsed in the 1930s, and Kreuger shot himself.

==== 1970s ====
- Between 1964 and its bankruptcy in 1973, the mutual fund and life insurance conglomerate Equity Funding ran a Ponzi scheme using fictitious life insurance policies. It sold these policies to reinsurance companies, using the money it received from these sales and from alleged deaths of policyholders to pay the incurred premiums. At its peak in 1972, it claimed assets of over $500 million.
- In the 1980s, Jean Pierre Van Rossem ran a stock market investment company called "Moneytron" in Belgium. Van Rossem claimed that he had developed a statistical model to predict the behavior of the stock markets and beat the capitalist system. Investors believed Van Rossem's claims, and that trust, coupled with his gift for self-promotion, allowed Van Rossem to accumulate US$ 860 million (about 32 billion Belgian francs). He also traded duplicate stocks. In 1991, he was sentenced to five years in prison for what was in part a Ponzi scheme; according to him, it was "a way to fuck the system".
- Between 1970 and 1984 in Portugal, Dona Branca maintained a scheme that paid 10% monthly interest. In 1988, she was sentenced to 10 years in prison. She always claimed that she was only trying to help the poor, but in her trial it was proven that she had received the equivalent of €85 million (almost US$120 million).
- In January 1984, Adriaan Nieuwoudt started the so-called "Kubus" scheme with an apparent beauty product in South Africa. Subscribers to the scheme bought a supposedly biological substance called an "activator", that was used to grow cultures in milk. After growing for a week or two, the cultures were harvested and dried, and sold back to the scheme. The cultures were never used for a beauty product but were simply ground up and resold to further investors as activators.
- 1600 investors in Diamond Mortgage Company and A.J. Obie, two firms with the same managers, lost approximately $50 million in what the Michigan Court of Appeals described as "the largest reported 'Ponzi' scheme in the history of the state". It led to the passage in 1987 of the Mortgage Brokers, Lenders, and Servicers Act.
- In the 1980s in San Diego, California, J. David & Company, a purported currency and commodity trading and investing operation named after its founder, J. David Dominelli, a withdrawn and shy currency and commodity trader, was revealed to be a Ponzi scheme which took in $200 million and returned $120 million to investors, leaving a net loss of $80 million. The scheme touched all levels of upper-class business and professional life in San Diego and environs. One of those most closely involved was Nancy Hoover, the mayor of Del Mar, California, a cozy upscale beach town just north of La Jolla. Hoover was J. David's assistant and live-in companion at the time. Also involved was the prominent New York law firm Rogers & Wells (now Clifford Chance), which had advised J. David (through a rogue partner) and others. When the fall came, J. David briefly escaped to Montserrat in the Caribbean, but was returned ultimately to plead guilty to federal charges and was sentenced to 20 years' imprisonment.
- Between 1978 and 1983, Ron Rewald ran an investment firm in Hawaii. The firm declared bankruptcy in 1983 and was revealed to have been a Ponzi scheme which defrauded over 400 investors of more than $22 million. Rewald claimed that he had been operating the firm as a front for the U.S. Central Intelligence Agency. Rewald was convicted and sentenced to 80 years in prison; he was paroled in 1995.
- From 1986 to 2001, Reed Slatkin raised almost $600 million from about 800 wealthy investors in one of the largest Ponzi schemes in the history of the United States.
- Tenka Ikka no Kai (天下一家の会, Tenka ikka no kai; literally meaning "The Society of One Family under the Heavens") was a pyramid scheme run by Ken'ichi Uchimura (内村健一). Behind the Tenka Ikka no Kai was the Dai-ichi Sōgo Keizai Kenkyūsho (第一相互経済研究所), run by Uchimura. This organization, established in 1972, once had a million members. It was a cause of the enactment of Japan's law prohibiting pyramid schemes. In 1986, the Dai-ichi Sōgo Keizai Kenkyūsho declared bankruptcy, leaving debts amounting to 189,600,000,000 yen. It has been called "the biggest pyramid scheme in history."

==== 1990s ====
- МММ was a Russian company that perpetrated one of the world's largest Ponzi schemes of all time. By different estimates from 5 to 40 million people lost up to $10 billion. The company started attracting money from private investors, promising annual returns of up to 1,000%. It is unclear whether a Ponzi scheme was the initial intention, as such extravagant returns might have been possible during the Russian hyperinflation in such commerce as import-export.
- In Romania, between 1991 and 1994, the Caritas scheme run by the "Caritas" company of Cluj-Napoca, owned by Ioan Stoica promised eight times the money invested in six months. It attracted 400,000 depositors from all over the country who invested 1,257 billion lei (about US$1 billion) before it finally went bankrupt on August 14, 1994, having a debt of US$450 million. The owner, Ioan Stoica, was sentenced in 1995 by the Cluj Court to a total of seven years in prison for fraud, but he appealed and it was reduced to two years; then he went on to the Supreme Court of Justice and the sentence was finally reduced to one year and a half.
- Anubhav Teak Plantations scam (India): From 1992 to 1998, a number of teak plantation Ponzi schemes were floated in India, prominent being Anubhav Plantations. These promised extravagant profits for people who invested in planting teak (done by purchasing "teak shares"). In 1998, Anubhav plantations collapsed leaving more than 31,000 depositors defrauded to the tune of Rs. 10712 Crores.
- Towers Financial Corporation, a bill collection agency, collapsed in 1993; in 1995, chairman Steven Hoffenberg pleaded guilty to bilking investors out of $475 million. Judge Robert W. Sweet sentenced him to 20 years in prison, plus a $1 million fine and $463 million in restitution. He settled a civil suit with the U.S. Securities and Exchange Commission for $60 million. He briefly was the owner of the New York Post. At the time the SEC considered the fraud to be "one of the largest Ponzi schemes in history."
- In late 1994, the European Kings Club collapsed, with ensuing losses of about $1.1 billion. This scam was led by Damara Bertges and Hans Günther Spachtholz. In the Swiss canton of Uri and Glarus, it was estimated that about one adult in ten invested into the EKC. The scam involved buying "letters" valued at 1,400 Swiss francs that entitled buyers to receive 12 monthly payments of 200 Swiss francs. The organisation was based in Gelnhausen, Germany.
- In early 1996, the United States Securities and Exchange Commission (SEC) filed a civil action against Bennett Funding Group, its chief financial officer, Patrick R. Bennett, and other companies Bennett controlled, in connection with a massive Ponzi scheme. The companies fraudulently raised hundreds of millions of dollars, purportedly to purchase assignments of equipment leases and promissory notes.
- From 1993 until 1997, a church named Greater Ministries International in Tampa, Florida, headed by Gerald Payne bilked over 18,000 people out of $500 million. Payne and other church elders promised the church members double their money back, citing Biblical scripture. However, nearly all the money was lost or hidden away. Church leaders received prison sentences ranging from 13 to 27 years.
- In 1995, airlines ticket broker World Plus was shut down. The company was found to be a Ponzi scheme.
- In the mid-1990s, Albania was transitioning into a liberalized market economy after years under a State-controlled economy reinforced by the cult of personality involving longtime Communist leader Enver Hoxha; the rudimentary financial system became dominated by pyramid schemes, and government officials tacitly endorsed a series of pyramid investment funds. Many Albanians, approximately two-thirds of the population, invested in them. In 1997, Albanians, who had lost $1.2 billion, took their protest to the streets where uncontainable rioting and attacks on government infrastructure led to the toppling of the government and the temporary existence of a stateless society. Although technically a Ponzi Scheme, the Albanian scams were commonly referred to as pyramid schemes both popularly and by the International Monetary Fund.
- In 1996, Sidney Schwartz and his son, Stuart F. Schwartz, pleaded guilty to charges of running a multimillion-dollar Ponzi scheme that targeted members of a Long Island, New York, country club at which the senior Schwartz was a member of the board of governors.
- In 1997, South African businessman Kenny Kunene was convicted of running a Ponzi scheme with over 2,000 investors and sentenced to six years in prison.
- In Delhi, India, Hoffland Finance collapsed amid a major scandal in 1998. Hoffland, a category II merchant banker, had been suspended by SEBI, which directed it to refrain from undertaking any new portfolio management assignments. It had floated a scheme, called "Invest Card", that lured investors with a return of 27% annually.
- Since 1998, 1040 Sunshine Project has been an illegal pyramid schemes or Multi-level marketing and originated in Beihai City, Guangxi Zhuang Autonomous Region.

=== 21st century ===
==== 2000s ====
- In 2001, some Haitians fell prey to Ponzi schemers offering rates up to 15%. The outfits, called "cooperatives", appeared to be implicitly backed by the government and became wildly popular in the population at large; investors felt safe because the co-ops were openly advertising in radio and TV ads using Haitian pop stars as spokespeople. It is estimated that more than $240 million was swindled from investors, equivalent to 60% of the country's government budget.
- The Brothers was a large investment operation in Costa Rica, from the late 1980s until 2002, eventually exposed as a Ponzi scheme. The fund was operated by brothers Luis Enrique and Osvaldo Villalobos. Investigators determined that the scam took in at least $400 million. Most of the clientele were American and Canadian retirees, but some Costa Ricans also invested the minimum $10,000. About 6,300 individuals ultimately were involved. Interest rates were 3% per month, usually paid in cash, or 2.8% compounded. The ability to pay such high interest was attributed to Luis Enrique Villalobos' existing agricultural aviation business, investment in unspecified European high-yield funds, and loans to Coca-Cola, among others. Osvaldo Villalobos' role was primarily to move money around a large number of shell companies and then pay investors. In May 2007, Osvaldo Villalobos was sentenced to 18 years in prison for fraud and illegal banking, while Luis Enrique Villalobos remains a fugitive.
- In 2003, the SEC shut down a $1 billion scheme by Mutual Benefits Company in Florida, run by Peter Lombardi, affecting 28,000 investors. Mutual claimed it used the money to pay viatical settlements to HIV patients. Lombardi is now serving a 20-year prison sentence.
- In 2004, the SEC fined Raymond James $6.9 million for failure to supervise former broker Dennis Herula, who was accused of participating with others in a Ponzi scheme that raised about $44.5 million from investors in 1999–2000. Herula himself raised about $16.5 million of investor funds, most of which was later transferred to his wife's brokerage account at Raymond James; he was arrested in Bermuda and extradited to the United States, where he pleaded guilty to fraud and was sentenced to 15 years and eight months' imprisonment.
- In February 2005, Moshe Leichner and his son Zvi were sentenced to 20 years in federal prison for running a Ponzi scheme that defrauded hundreds of investors out of more than $95 million for investors of GunnAllen Financial (shut down by regulators in March 2010 for fraud allegations and losses related to another Ponzi scheme); additionally, Safe Harbor Capital Management (now dba HarborLight Capital Management) lost $40 million for their investors.
- In May 2006, James Paul Lewis Jr. was sentenced to 30 years in federal prison for running a $311 million Ponzi scheme over a 20-year period. He operated under the name Financial Advisory Consultants from Lake Forest, California.
- In October 2006, in Malaysia, two prominent members of society and several others were held for running an alleged scam, known as SwissCash or Swiss Mutual Fund (1948). SwissCash offered returns of up to 300% within a 15-month investment period. Currently, this HYIP investment is offered to citizens of Malaysia, Singapore, and Indonesia. It claimed investors' funds were channeled to business activities ranging from oil exploration to shipping and agriculture in the Caribbean. The company claims to be operating out of New York City and incorporated in the Commonwealth of Dominica.
- In October 2006, Gregory Nathan, a Sydney fund manager, was arrested on charges including dishonest conduct and obtaining money by making false and misleading statements, in what investigators discovered to have been a Ponzi scheme. On September 19, 2008, Nathan was sentenced to seven years' imprisonment, including a non-parole period of five years.
- In 2007, a million Chinese lost over $1.2 billion in a scheme involving ant farming.
- On April 13, 2007, Sibtul Shah was arrested for Ponzi scheme that promised to double the initial investment in 15, later extended to 70, days.
- On June 27, 2007, former boy band mogul Lou Pearlman was indicted by a grand jury on several counts of fraud and money laundering after running a $500 million Ponzi scheme over 20 years; he pleaded guilty and was sentenced to 25 years' imprisonment. However, for each million Pearlman paid back to the government, his sentence would be reduced by a month.
- On August 17, 2007, the Philippine National Bureau of Investigation (NBI) filed syndicated estafa cases against 27 officers and investors of FrancSwiss Investment, a Ponzi pyramiding scam on the Internet. Charged were Michael Mansfield, chief financial officer; Kurt Sandelman, risk management team leader; Rupert Benedict Da Vinco, investment team leader; Julia Rodriguez, international banking team leader; Hector Willem Sidberg, marketing and international affairs; Fernando Munoz, customer service leader; Roger Smith, the British chief operation officer of FS Investment in the Asia-Pacific region; Bensy Fong, the Singaporean system operation officer; a Singaporean marketing officer; a certain Michelle and Mike, Filipino secretaries and collectors of money from investors; and 16 investors, including arrested suspect Eleazard Castillo, 26, a native of Cabuyao, Ilocos Sur, allegedly one of the financial advisers of FrancSwiss Investment. Forty-one investors claimed they lost a total of $75,000 to the investment scheme. FrancSwiss deceived investors in the Philippines of ₱1 billion ($50 million).
- On March 7, 2008, WinCapita Oy's Internet site was shut down due to investigation of the company. The company had collected about 100 million euros by this point. This, the so-called biggest pyramid-scheme in Finland, was put up by Hannu Kailajärvi and his partner Tiina Wartti. They marketed the company by saying that the company is a successful currency exchange firm and that people can join the club only by invitation. They also marketed the idea for investors by promising net profits of over 400%. In 2013, the court of appeal for Helsinki sentenced Kailajärvi to prison for 5 years and Wartti for one year and 3 months to conditional discharge.
- On May 2, 2008, it was reported that John G. Ervin of Safevest LLC had been arrested by the FBI on suspicion of running a Ponzi scheme that collected $25.7 million, mostly from Christian investors, partly recruited through Ervin's business partner Pastor John Slye and members of his church. Specifically, according to newspaper the Orange County Register, "the company recruited church members to sell the investment to other church members." Slye had run a cancer research charity, which gave investors confidence. The scheme ran from May 2007 but started to run out of funds by October as investors asked for their money back. Safevest LLC returned $18 million to investors, the rest having been split among five main expenditures, including the two business partners' families, the purchase of a $1 million golf course, and $950,000 for GTS Research Inc. The latter, run by Carl LaRue Godfrey who was previously convicted for "illegal business practices and various other crimes", was served a Desist and Refrain order by the State of California in August 2007, the year of the Safevest scheme. GTS Research had claimed to have a patent pending for a new energy source. The fifth portion, $510,000, was paid to Dennis D. Cope, who had a criminal conviction in relation to a previous Ponzi scheme. Ervin himself had been sued in 2003 for running a separate $7.7 million Ponzi scheme, a fact that could be discovered through an internet search.
- In the third and the biggest Philippine Ponzi scam (involving $150 million and $250 million, respectively), criminal charges, based on a suit filed by 21,000 complainants, were filed in June 2008, with the Department of Justice, against Performance Investments Products Corp (PIPC) officers and incorporators for violation of the Securities Regulation Code (SRC), versus: Singaporean national Michael H.K. Liew, PIPC president; Cristina Gonzalez-Tuason, general manager; and other officers and agents: Ma. Cristina Bautista-Jurado, Barbara Garcia, Anthony Kierulf, Eugene Go, Michael Melchor Nubla, Ma. Pamela Morris, Luis Aragon, Renato Sarmiento Jr., Victor Jose Vergel de Dios, Nicoline Amoranto Mendoza, Jose Tengco III, Oudine Santos and Herley Jesuitas.
- In March 2008, Val Southwick of Ogden, Utah, pleaded guilty to operating an elaborate real estate investing Ponzi scheme, believed to be the largest in Utah's history, with losses of up to $200 million.
- On August 1, 2008, the WexTrust Investment firm was shut down by the SEC, charging that WexTrust and two of its owners (Joseph Shereshevsky of Norfolk, Virginia, and Steven Byers of Oak Brook, Illinois) operated a Ponzi-type scheme by promising unusually high returns to earlier investors and paying them with money raised from later investors. The SEC case, filed in federal court in Manhattan, New York, alleged that WexTrust and the two men defrauded investors by diverting at least $100 million to unauthorized uses. WexTrust targeted the Orthodox Jewish community, particularly in Norfolk, VA and New York City. The receiver, Timothy Coleman, has returned only 2% of principal to WexTrust investors. Shereshevsky and Byers pleaded guilty to securities fraud, mail fraud and conspiracy, and were sentenced to 21 years and 10 months' imprisonment, and 13 years and four months' imprisonment, respectively, in addition to being ordered to make restitution and disgorge their gains.
- Business Consulting International was a London-based investment company that collapsed after being exposed by a City of London Police investigation in 2008 as the United Kingdom's biggest ponzi scheme, estimated at £115 million. The business was set up and run by London-based Indian businessman Kautilya Nandan Pruthi, in partnership with Kenneth Peacock and John Anderson.
- On December 1, 2008, in Saint Cloud, Minnesota, celebrity businessman Tom Petters was charged by the Federal government as the mastermind behind a $3.65 billion Ponzi scheme that bilked investors over a 13-year period. Petters lived an extravagant lifestyle supported by his Ponzi scheme. Petters faces 20 counts of wire and mail fraud, conspiracy, and money laundering for the alleged investment scheme that ran from 1995 through September 2008. He is expected to plead not guilty, but his co-conspirators in the Ponzi scheme, Deanna Coleman, Robert White, Michael Catain, and Larry Reynolds, have all pleaded guilty. The Petters Ponzi scheme came to an end when Petters' top co-conspirator Deanna Coleman turned government informant and wore a wire. Petters and the others were planning to flee to countries without extradition agreements with the U.S. Deanna Coleman and Michael Catain had properties in Costa Rica. On December 2, 2009, Tom Petters was found guilty in the U.S. District Court in St. Paul, Minnesota, on 20 counts of wire and mail fraud. In April 2010, he was sentenced to 50 years in the fraud.
- On December 10, 2008, Bernard Madoff, who, through the defrauding of his clients, had created one of the most prominent financial firms on Wall Street, told sons that his investments were "all one big lie". The following day he was arrested and charged with a single count of securities fraud. As of December 2008, the paper losses were estimated to be $65 billion, easily making it the largest fraud in history. Mark Madoff was found dead in his Manhattan apartment at 158 Mercer Street. Using a dog leash tied to a beam, he had hanged himself from the ceiling. His suicide occurred on the second anniversary of his father's arrest. Madoff was sentenced to 150 years in prison on June 29, 2009. He died in prison in 2021.
- On January 9, 2009, the SEC charged Joseph S. Forte from Broomall, Pennsylvania, with masterminding a $50 million Ponzi scheme. He swindled over 80 investors, mostly close friends from 1995 to 2009. The SEC investigator called Forte a "complete fraud". Records show Forte used, for personal purposes, over $28 million. On November 24, 2009, Forte was sentenced to 15 years in prison.
- On January 16, 2009, the United Kingdom Serious Fraud Office uncovered an £80 million buy-to-let property fraud scheme operating under a company called Practical Property Portfolio in which at least 1,750 investors were conned out of £25,000 each in return for a promise of a house in the North East of England. All five directors—John Potts, Peter Gosling, Natalie Laverick, Peter Graham, and Eric Armstrong—pleaded guilty to fraud and were sentenced in March 2009.
- On January 26, 2009, Nicholas Cosmo, founder of Agape World, surrendered to federal authorities in connection with a suspected $380 million Ponzi scheme. Previously convicted of fraud in 1999, Cosmo surrendered at the Long Island Railroad train station in Hicksville, New York, and was sentenced to 50 years' imprisonment. In March 2009, a lawsuit was filed in New York against Bank of America, one of the largest banks in the United States, that claimed that Bank of America "established, equipped and staffed" a branch office in the headquarters of Cosmo's firm, Agape Merchant Advance. As a result, the lawsuit contends that the bank knowingly "assisted, facilitated and furthered" Mr. Cosmo's fraudulent scheme.
- On February 9, 2009, the City of London Police Economic Crime Department arrested Terry Freeman, director of GFX Capital Markets Ltd, over a £40 million fraud which is possibly a Ponzi scheme.
- On February 17, 2009, the Stanford International Bank and proprietor Allen Stanford were accused of "massive fraud" by U.S. authorities, and SIB's assets were frozen. The apparent Ponzi scheme drew in more than $8 billion of "deposits" to Sir Allen's bank in Antigua, many from investors in Latin America. He was arrested by the Federal Bureau of Investigation on June 14, 2009, and sentenced to 110 years' imprisonment on June 14, 2012.
- On February 25, 2009, the SEC charged James Nicholson for allegedly "defraud[ing] hundreds of investors of millions of dollars"
- On March 13, 2009, a 67-year-old Ohio woman named Joanne Schneider was sentenced to three years in prison, the minimum allowed, for operating a Ponzi scheme that cost investors an estimated $60 million. On appeal she was sentenced to 10 years.
- On June 2, 2009, the Colorado State Grand Jury indicted Jason Trevor Brooks of Boulder, Colorado, on 24 counts of security fraud and theft. Authorities allege that from June 2005 to February 2008, Brooks collected about $10 million from investors to invest, but then used a vast majority of the funds for personal expenses, gambling, and to make interest payments and payouts to other investors. Brooks, working under the Genius Inc. name, told investors he had a distribution agreement with Matsushita Electric Industrial Co. Ltd. of Japan, which allowed him to purchase electronics and appliances as a distributor and then resell them for a profit to various home builders and other businesses, authorities said. On April 27, 2010, Brooks pleaded guilty to two felony counts of securities fraud and two counts of making an untrue statement. He was sentenced to eight years in prison for each of the four counts, to run cumulatively for a total sentence of 32 years, and was also ordered to pay more than $5.1 million in restitution to his victims.
- On June 12, 2009, investors were reported to have lost billions of South African Rands in a Ponzi scheme masterminded by Barry Tannenbaum.
- On June 17, 2009, Donald Anthony Walker Young (also known as Tony Young or Walker Young), had his office seized for using money from new investors to pay previous investors and using some of the money to purchase a vacation home in Palm Beach, Florida. Young operated the alleged Ponzi scheme through an investment partnership Acorn II L.P., which he established in 2001 to invest in publicly traded securities, authorities said. The SEC alleged in its 22-page complaint that the fraud began in mid-2005 and continued until recently. He was indicted on April 1, 2010; pleaded guilty in July 2010, to mail fraud and money laundering and was sentenced to 17½ years in prison in May 2011.
- On November 16, 2009, the SEC charged four individuals and two companies for perpetrating a Ponzi scheme to defraud over 300 investors of $30 million. Pennsylvania-based Mantria Corporation, run by executives Troy Wragg and Amanda Knorr, supposedly focused on green initiatives such as a "carbon negative" housing community in Tennessee and an organic waste–derived "biochar" charcoal substitute production plant. Between September 2007 through November 2009, Mantria Corporation raised funds through Denver-based Speed of Wealth LLC, run by Wayde and Donna McKelvy. The SEC alleged that Mantria and Speed of Wealth exaggerated the scope and success of Mantria's operations. Subsequent charges estimate Mantria and Speed of Wealth raised $54 million, of which they paid $17.5 million to investors, using investors' own funds to pay those returns.
- December 1, 2009: Scott W. Rothstein—a disbarred lawyer and the former managing shareholder, chairman, and chief executive officer of the now-defunct Rothstein Rosenfeldt Adler law firm—was accused of funding his philanthropy, political contributions, law firm salaries, and an extravagant lifestyle with a massive $1.4 billion Ponzi scheme. Rothstein was a collector of rare and exotic cars and owned a multimillion-dollar collection including notably a 2008 Bugatti Veyron, a white 2010 Lamborghini Murcielago SV, a yellow Mclaren SLR, a matching pair of Ferrari 430 spiders, a Rolls Royce Phantom and a Bentley Continental GT. Rothstein was regularly seen arriving at his law firm in his Bugatti Veyron. Scott Rothstein turned himself in to federal authorities and was subsequently arrested on charges related to the Racketeer Influenced and Corrupt Organizations Act (RICO). Rothstein was denied bond by U.S. Magistrate Judge Robin Rosenbaum, who ruled that due to his ability to forge documents, he was considered a flight risk. Although his arraignment plea was not guilty, Rothstein cooperated with the government and reversed his plea to guilty of five federal crimes on January 27, 2010. He was sentenced to 50 years despite the prosecution asking for 40 years.

==== 2010s ====
- In 2010, Trevor Cook of Minnesota pled guilty and began serving a 25-year federal prison sentence in connection with the Oxford Group, which reportedly took in $194 million. Bo Beckman still has charges pending in connection with the scheme.
- In early 2010, Tzvi Erez from Toronto, Canada, scammed 76 creditors out of a combined $27 million. He created an illegitimate print business called E Graphix and convinced investors to give him large loans in order to carry out fictional printing orders. He was charged with fraud and forgery by Toronto police but was not convicted, since the Canadian courts lacked adequate trial time to give him a trial. The following year, he was arrested again and charged with fraud in a similar print investment scheme that netted $9 million. In 2018, he was convicted for fraud and sentenced to eight years.
- On May 20, 2010, the SEC filed a federal case against Edward A. Allen and David L. Olson, two former brokers of World Financial Group / World Group Securities, accusing them of having raised approximately $14.8 million through the offer and sale of promissory notes as part of an illegal Ponzi scheme in the States of Ohio and Florida between September 2005 and December 2008.
- On June 15, 2010, the United States Securities and Exchange commission filed an enforcement action against Matt Jennings and his cohorts and accused them of running a Ponzi Scheme wherein they stole over $53 million from investors. On December 12, 2012, the court appointed receiver for Westmore entities filed an action against Robert Jennings for return of investor funds.
- In December 2011, film exhibitor Norman Adie pleaded guilty in U.S. Federal Court to running a Ponzi scheme in New York and Pennsylvania.
- In December 2011, the SEC accused Wendell Jacobson and his son Allen, both of Fountain Green, Utah, of operating a $200 million Ponzi scheme that promised to invest in property and made heavy use of the Jacobsons' membership in the LDS Church to recruit victims. The Federal case was resolved in 2012 with the liquidation of the Jacobsens' company MSI, but Utah officials subsequently filed additional charges in 2015; the case is ongoing as of March 2019.
- In May 2012, Joseph Blimline was sentenced to 20 years in federal prison for operating two oil and gas Ponzi schemes. He operated a Ponzi scheme from 2003 to 2005 in Michigan, netting over $28 million. He then operated a Ponzi scheme in Texas, using a company called Provident Royalties, that lasted from 2006 to 2009 and netted over $400 million.
- On August 17, 2012, the SEC filed a federal case against defendants Paul Burks and Zeek Rewards, based out of North Carolina. Paul Burks ran the entity of Zeek Rewards, a fraudulent investment opportunity that promised investors returns as high as 1.5% per day by sharing in the profits of Zeekler, a penny auction. Investors were encouraged to recruit new members to increase their returns. New investors had to pay a monthly "subscription" of up to $99/month and an initial investment of up to $10,000. The higher the initial investment, the higher the returns appeared. The Zeekler entity was an online penny auction that served as a front for the Zeek Rewards entity. Investors in the Zeek Rewards scheme were promised payouts from the profits made on Zeekler by recruiting new members and giving out "bids" that customers would use on the penny auction. While the Zeekler website did bring in revenue, it was only about 1% of what investors believed was being brought into the Zeek Rewards company. The vast majority of dispersed funds were paid out from newly recruited investors. It is believed that the ponzi scheme was a $600M enterprise and the number of affected investors was 1 million when the SEC filed suit. This made Zeek Rewards the largest ponzi scheme in history by number of affected investors, even though numerous other ponzi schemes have had larger enterprise values. Paul Burks paid $4 million to the SEC and agreed to cooperate. It remains unknown how much, if any, of the funds lost in the scheme will be returned to affected investors, as of August 2012.
- In August 2012, Trendon T. Shavers (aka "Pirate" and "pirateat40"), the founder and operator of "Bitcoin Savings and Trust" (BTCST), a non-existent company advertised over an internet forum, disappeared from the public scene. Shavers raised at least 700,000 Bitcoin in BTCST investments by running it as a Ponzi scheme. The fact that BTCST was run using Bitcoin makes this a unique instance of a Ponzi scheme. It allowed Shavers to initially stay completely anonymous, making it possible for him to just disappear with the money from his investors. Although some called it a pyramid scheme, BTCST is generally considered a Ponzi scheme. At the time he disappeared, somewhere around August 31, the 700,000 BTC were valued at around US$4,500,000. However, since Bitcoin prices increased significantly since the time it happened, they are now estimated to be worth more than US$2.5 billion. The SEC charged Shavers with securities fraud. Shavers pled guilty, and on July 21, 2016, he was sentenced to 18 months in prison, and 3 years of supervised release.
- On September 5, 2012, the Economic Offences Wing of the Tamil Nadu Police arrested M S Guru, the mastermind of a 'contract emu farming' scheme for financial fraud and cheating over 12,000 investors. The filed cases alone amount to over $28 million.
- In 2012, U.S. Department of Justice busted AdSurfDaily Ponzi Scheme which promised big returns for clicking on advertisements. DOJ forfeited ASD's assets, and imprisoned its founder, Thomas A. Bowdoin. Other notable ASD figures include Kenneth Wayne Leaming and Christian Oesch (who later became the CEO of BX Protocol maker Delta), who unsuccessfully "intervened" to claim monies lost in the ASD Ponzi Scheme.
- On October 1, 2012, a joint raiding operation was conducted on Genneva Malaysia Sdn Bhd and its affiliates by the Royal Malaysian Police, Ministry of Domestic Trade, Cooperatives and Consumerism, Companies Commission of Malaysia, and Bank Negara Malaysia. Singapore's Commercial Affairs Department has also conducted a similar operation against Genneva Pte. Ltd. in Singapore. Estimation of RM10 billion (close to US$330 million) filed cases.
- In April 2013, in Israel, Eran Mizrahi was convicted for multiple counts of fraud and money laundering and sentenced to 12 years in a scheme which promised and investment in foreign-currency via Swiss banks, but in which outflows were paid from existing investor's funds which were also funneled to Mizrahi and his family.
- In June 2013, in Tunisia, a fraudulent investment network collapsed when the master of a Ponzi scheme, Adel Dridi, tried to flee the country following government investigation with more than 80 million Tunisian dinars that he stole from around fifty thousand investors, many of whom claimed that they sold their possessions to enjoy the interests of Yosr development. Adel Dridi was arrested the day after he ran, and he is now being prosecuted. The company "Yosr Developpement Ltd" director was behind money laundering, illegal investments and Ponzi scheme frauds.
- On February 26, 2014, Gregory Loles, who formerly ran Farnbacher-Loles and related investment entities, was sentenced to 25 years' imprisonment by federal judge Alvin W. Thompson for a $25 million Ponzi scheme resulting in several million dollars in losses.
- In June 2014, the Securities Exchange Commission alleged that Tom Abraham and Kenneth Grant, their company KGTA Petroleum, Ltd., stockbrokers Jeffrey Gainer and Jerry Cicolani, and others orchestrated and/or helped promote a Ponzi scheme related to KGTA, a petroleum company that purported to earn profits by buying and reselling crude oil and refined fuel products. Grant and Abdallah were accused of having operated KGTA as a Ponzi scheme. The oil purchase orders never existed and KGTA did not sell fuel or oil to its purported buyers, according to the complaint. In classic Ponzi scheme fashion, KGTA allegedly used some of the funds raised from new investors to pay fake returns to earlier investors. The two men raised at least $20.73 million between October 8, 2012, and February of this year. In October 2016, Grant, Abdallah, Jerry Cicolani, Jeffrey Gainer, Mark George, and Kelly Hood were sentenced to prison.
- In March 2014, Canadian Arlan Galbraith was sentenced to over seven years in prison for a Ponzi scheme involving pigeon breeding. His Pigeon King International firm (which collapsed in 2008) was found to be recruiting investors with the promise of buying back pigeons for various purposes, but in reality for which there was no genuine market. He had taken nearly $42 million from farmers.
- In September 2014, the Securities Exchange Commission conducted an emergency asset freeze and filed civil fraud alleging that a California-based company, Nationwide Automated Systems, Inc. (NASI), was operating a $123 million ATM ponzi scheme.
- In July 2015, a federal grand jury indicted Edwin Fujinaga, Junzo Suzuki and Paul Suzuki for operating a $1.5 billion Ponzi scheme. Fujinaga operated a company called MRI International Inc. in Las Vegas, Nevada. The company claimed that it collected medical accounts receivable at a discount and then collected the full amount from insurers. The victims were mostly Japanese citizens. Fujinaga and MRI were earlier found liable in a civil suit for $584 million.
- In October 2015, in Israel, Amir Bramly's Kela fund, which offered fixed-interest investments supposedly for a low-risk "Capital Completion" strategy, went into liquidation proceedings before the Tel Aviv district court after not meeting client outflow demands. During the proceedings, more than 300 million NIS of unfulfilled debt, mostly from investors, were set before the court. In addition, the court-appointed liquidator produced a report claiming that funds in the Kela fund were not actually used for "Capital completion" but rather funneled into Rubicon Business Group, and that in addition the funds were moved from Rubicon to Bramly and his family, due to which a court order prohibiting disposition of assets was placed on Bramly and members of his family. As a result, the Kela fund, Rubicon Business Group, and a number of held companies were placed in permanent liquidation by the Tel Aviv district court in January 2016 after the court determined that funds were intermeshed between the companies, and that debts, mainly to investors, exceeded assets. In June 2016, Bramly was indicted for theft, fraud and laundering of more than 400 million NIS, and Kela's investment recruiter Sivan Zibulski, as part of a plea bargain in which she will serve as a prosecutor's witness, was convicted and sentenced in January 2017.
- In June 2013, Brazilian Justice first blocked Telexfree Brazilian operations, and in September 2015, convicted the company for operating a Ponzi Scheme. Telexfree operations in US were shut down by SEC April 2014. In October 2016, Telexfree co-owner James Merrill pleaded guilty. Telexfree was a multibillion-dollar Ponzi scheme desguised as an internet phone service company. Prosecutors have described it as the largest fraud of all time in terms of the number of people affected—more than 1 million, with victims in various countries.
- In late 2014 OneCoin was launched. It was not a decentralized cryptocurrency but rather a centralized pyramid scheme hosted on OneCoin Ltd's servers which was marketed as a cryptocurrency. The scheme was set up by Ruja Ignatova. Ruja Ignatova's collaborator and OneCoin's co-founder Sebastian Karl Greenwood was arrested in Thailand in July 2018. He was imprisoned in Thailand pending extradition to the United States. In May 2022, Europol added Ignatova to their "Europe's Most Wanted" list, offering a €5,000,000 reward for information leading to her arrest. On June 30, the Federal Bureau of Investigation added Ignatova to the FBI Ten Most Wanted Fugitives list, offering a reward of up to $100,000 for information leading to her arrest. In September 2023, Greenwood was sentenced to a 20-year federal prison term (minus 5-years already served) by a New York Federal court.
- On October 7, 2015, Burton Greenberg of Plantation, Florida, and Bruce Kane, an Ithaca, NY, CPA but resident of Fort Lauderdale, Florida, were arrested by the FBI for a 9-year Ponzi scheme that swindled investors out of over $10 million. The scam was operated under the name "Global Financial Fund 8, LLP". In February 2016, Greenberg pleaded guilty, and in December 2016, Kane also pleaded guilty, and both were sentenced to 97 months (8 years and 1 month) in federal prison for wire fraud. Both men blamed the other for being the mastermind of the fraud. Kane is an inmate at FCI Bennettsville, and Greenberg is an inmate at FCI Miami. U.S. District Court Judge Thomas McAvoy called it a "conscienceless" crime.
- In late 2015, the Fanya Metal Exchange in China ceased operations. It was later determined to be a Ponzi scheme and embezzlement fraud. The founder, Shan Jiuliang, was sentenced to 18 years in jail. Over 220,000 creditors lost 43 billion yuan ($6.7 billion).
- In July 2016, the SEC obtained a Temporary Restraining Order against Traffic Monsoon LLC and its owner Charles Scoville, a Utah-based endeavor promoted as an advertising firm, accusing him of operating a Ponzi Scheme and four counts of fraud
- In August 2017, Indonesian authorities shut down First Travel, an umrah travel agency that offered reduced-cost pilgrimages below market prices, in which over 60,000 pilgrims lost a combined 905 billion rupiah without ever landing in the holy cities in Saudi Arabia, with operators using the funds from newer pilgrims to fund older ones, as well as various luxuries. The operators of the scheme, Andika Surachman and his wife Anniesa Hasibuan, was sentenced to 20 and 18 years in prison respectively for the fraud, plus 10 million rupiah in fines.
- In October 2017, authorities charged Michael Scronic of Pound Ridge, New York, with criminal and civil charges, alleging that he lost or spent all but about $27,000 of the $21.8 million he told investors in his hedge fund he had.
- In December 2017, the Woodbridge Group of Companies (a/k/a Woodbridge Securities) was charged as an alleged US$1.2 billion Ponzi scheme run by real estate developer Robert H. Shapiro (not to be confused with attorney Robert L. Shapiro) by The U.S. Securities and Exchange Commission (SEC). On December 4, 2017, Woodbridge and 236 related limited liability companies Woodbridge formed filed for bankruptcy in the Delaware Federal Court. The Woodbridge Group of Companies filed for bankruptcy amid the departure of its chief executive and an investigation into potential securities fraud linked to $1 billion in investments. The Chapter 11 filing on Monday in U.S. Bankruptcy Court in Wilmington, Delaware, cited "unforeseen costs associated with ongoing litigation and regulatory compliance." The SEC had been probing whether Woodbridge defrauded investors who invested more than $1 billion. According to an October SEC court filing, the agency also sought more information on 236 "liability companies Woodbridge formed. On December 21, 2017, the U.S. Securities and Exchange Commission said it had sued luxury real estate developer Shapiro and his Woodbridge Group of Companies for allegedly operating a $1.2 billion Ponzi scheme targeting thousands of investors. According to the SEC’s complaint, Shapiro ran a "sham" business model that allegedly defrauded more than 8,400 investors, including many elderly, in unregistered Woodbridge funds. It said Shapiro promised 5 to 10 percent annual interest on money he said would be used for loans to commercial property owners paying 11 to 15 percent interest rates. "Mr. Shapiro is cooperating with the bankruptcy to protect the assets held for the benefit of Woodbridge’s stakeholders," Ryan O’Quinn, a lawyer for Shapiro, said in e-mail. "He denies any allegation of wrongdoing and looks forward to his opportunity to defend himself in a court of law."
- On January 16, 2018, the cryptocurrency token Bitconnect (BCC) plummeted in value after from a high of $331 to $21 within six hours, its market cap declining from a high of $2 billion to $130 million. Bitconnect, which promised 1% daily returns through a "crypto-currency trading bot" was forced to close. The scheme also had a particularly lucrative affiliate program, which promoted users to lure others into the scheme, ultimately leading to a lack of new users and a collapse in the value of Bitconnect tokens.
- In April 2018, Deepak Jangra and Deepak Malhotra were investigated and arrested by Delhi Cyber Crime for operating a series of bitcoin-based MLM schemes since 2016.
- In September 2018, Claud R. "Rick" Koerber of Utah was found guilty of operating a Ponzi scheme promoting a property investment business that took almost $100 million from investors.
- In November 2018, Gaylen Rust of Utah was accused of operating a Ponzi scheme masquerading as a precious metals investment pool generating growth of 25–40% per year, scamming between $47 million and $200 million from more than 200 investors.
- In early 2019, in the Kapa investment scam, the Philippine government shut down Kapa-Community Ministry International and its self-declared pastor, Joel Apolinario.
- In January 2020, the SEC filed a federal case against a Californian couple, Jeff and Paulette Carpoff, charging them of organizing a $910 million Ponzi scheme. The money was taken from 17 investors between 2011 and 2018. The couple used their solar generator companies, DC Solar Solutions Inc. and DC Solar Distribution Inc., to convince investors of buying solar generators, which at least half of them were never manufactured. According to the investigations, the couple promised the investors tax credits, lease payments, and profits, but in fact the majority of the lease revenue was being paid from new investors. Instead, they used the money to spend on their lavish lifestyle, including a NASCAR Xfinity Series sponsorship deal with Chip Ganassi Racing, which shut down their Xfinity Series team when the scheme was busted. The couple pled guilty.
- Since 2019, an MLM scheme using Ethereum blockchain technology called million.money was in operations with over 300,000 investors.
- On July 30, 2019, Hunter Brian Hanson pled guilty to operating a Ponzi scheme that defrauded grain farmers in North Dakota and Canada. He was 22 years old when he was convicted of fraud and money laundering.
- On December 30, 2019, the Securities and Exchanges Commission filed charges against Today's Growth Consultant Inc. dba "The Income Store" and Kenneth D. Courtright III, claiming the defendants raised funds in an unregistered offering by making use of misrepresentations to investors and potential investors that the entirety of their invested funds would be used to buy or create revenue-generating websites, as well as to administer and promote said websites to further the company's passive-income generation scheme. However, the SEC alleged that a sizable portion of new investors’ funds were used to pay out guaranteed returns to earlier investors and various loans or transferred to Courtright for his personal expenses. According to court documents, Courtright is believed to have raised at least $75 million from some 500 investors between January 1, 2017, and December 30, 2019. Of this total, it is estimated that an amount in excess of $20 million was paid out to early investors as Ponzi-like payments. Furthermore, a minimum of $2 million is believed to have been transferred directly to Courtright for personal use. The SEC has ordered a freeze on the defendants’ assets and filed a restraining order to prevent the destruction or altering of records. Today's Growth Consultants Inc. dba "The Income Store" was subsequently placed in receivership to preserve the company's books, records, and assets.

==== 2020s ====
- In June 2020, an Ontario Securities Commission report found that QuadrigaCX, believed to be Canada's largest cryptocurrency exchange, was a Ponzi scheme after millions of dollars disappeared following the apparent death of founder Gerald Cotten. It was revealed that Cotten had operated multiple accounts under aliases, credited with 'fictitious currency and crypto asset balances' covering balance shortfalls with other clients' deposits after running into difficulty following falls in the price of crypto assets.
- In September 2020, Natalie Cochran pleaded guilty to wire fraud and money laundering charges related to a Ponzi scheme she ran from 2017 to 2019. She was sentenced to 135 months in federal prison, pay over $2M in restitution to the victims, and forfeit assets gained through the fraud.
- In November 2020, Australian police searched the Sydney home of Melissa Caddick, who had been running a Ponzi scheme thought to have taken about 30 million dollars from investors; many of them are relatives or close friends. Much of the money had been dissipated in high living. Caddick disappeared a few hours after the search. Caddick's family were informed about her DNA match after her decomposed foot washed up on Bournda Beach on the state's south coast, just south of Tathra, on 21 February 2021.
- On March 31, 2021, Gina Champion-Cain was sentenced to 15 Years for a $350 million+ ponzi scheme and obstruction of justice, the largest woman-run Ponzi scheme in American history.
- In April 2021, Israeli-American businessman Mike Ben-Ari, also known as Michael David Greenfield, was arrested in Israel on suspicion of operating a large-scale Ponzi scheme through his investment company, Ever Green Fields Enterprises (EGFE) Israel Ltd. The scheme allegedly defrauded approximately 1,000 investors in Israel and the United States over a 15-year period, accumulating losses estimated at $150 million. Following his arrest, Ben-Ari was released to house arrest after posting a NIS 2 million ($625,000) bond. In May 2021, he fled Israel using a false passport, reportedly provided by an associate, in violation of his bail conditions. An Interpol Red Notice was issued for his arrest. He was located and arrested in Bosnia and Herzegovina in July 2021. After legal proceedings, the Bosnian Supreme Court approved his extradition, and he was returned to Israel in December 2022 to face charges. In March 2023, Ben-Ari entered a plea bargain agreement, admitting to charges of aggravated fraud, document forgery, and money laundering. Under the terms of the agreement, he is to serve a prison sentence ranging from five to nine and a half years, with the exact duration to be determined by the court. As part of the agreement, Ben-Ari agreed to cooperate with authorities in efforts to recover assets and compensate victims. In 2024, a court-appointed trustee facilitated the distribution of approximately ₪50 million (about US$13 million) to hundreds of victims, using assets recovered through legal actions against Ben-Ari and affiliated entities. The EGFE case is considered one of the largest and most notorious Ponzi schemes uncovered in Israel.
- In April 2021, QBF Investment Company, a Russian Asset Management and investment firm, collapsed after defrauding investors of over 2 billion rubles (approximately $27 million) from 2011 to 2021. The Central Bank of Russia revoked its license in July 2021, leading to criminal prosecutions of key executives, while founder Roman Shpakov and Finance Director Linda Athanasiadou remain international fugitives.
- In June 2022, Celsius Network indefinitely paused all transfers before filing for Chapter 11 bankruptcy on July 13, 2022, the same day that the Federal Trade Commission announced a $4.7 billion settlement that would ban Celsius Network from handling consumers' assets. The company had lent out $8 billion to clients and had almost $12 billion in assets under management as of May 2022, up from $1.2 billion in loans and $200 million AUM reported in 2019. Days prior, former investment manager Jason Stone sued Celsius, alleging that the company ran a Ponzi scheme. The independent examiner's report filed on January 31, 2023, as part of the bankruptcy filing, said that an insider at Celsius described aspects of the business model as "very ponzi like." In an internal memo, coin deployment specialist Dean Tappen stated "that his title at Celsius should be 'Ponzi Consultant.'"
- Denaro UK Ltd. This scheme mostly operated in the North of England was run by Colin Hesketh, Tony Bracken and Onforio Andrew Capostagno (nickname Nucc). It was wound up by a liquidator in 2024 Both Bracken and Hesketh received police charges (investigation ongoing), while Capostagno is deceased following suicide. The liquidator has taken a £37M high court case against Barclays Bank over its role in the £90M Ponzi Scheme. "Denaro was founded in Liverpool by an IT worker, a car mechanic, and a carpet salesman with no background in finance. Operating between 2013 and 2023, the firm convinced hundreds of retail investors to hand over thousands of pounds in "loans" by promising an unsustainable 3% monthly return."
- On August 2023, Metaverse Foreign Exchange (MTFE) a ponzi scheme which collected funds claiming to be a trading platform that uses AI bots to automate cryptocurrency trade defrauded over a Billion USD mainly from investors in Africa and South Asia The scheme used a system that rewarded users for recruiting more under them and the Central Bank of Sri Lanka had warned it to be a pyramid scheme. In reality, MTFE did not actually carry out trades, and the bot simply fabricated profits and losses to give the appearance of a legitimate platform. When the scheme finally collapsed, all accounts were programmed to show fake negative balances. In 2026 the Central Bank of Sri Lanka officially declared it as a prohibited pyramid scheme. In 2026 officials have described the 2026 Turkish investment fund scandal as Ponzy like Scheme.

== Other notable schemes ==
Other notable (but involving smaller amounts of money) Ponzi schemes include:

- In 1880, Sarah Howe opened up a "Ladies Deposit" in Boston promising eight percent monthly interest, although she had no method of making profits. This unique scheme was billed as "for women only". Howe was arrested on October 18, 1880, by New York City Police and sentenced to three years in prison.
- On March 22, 2000, four people were indicted in the Northern District of Ohio, on charges including conspiracy to commit and committing mail and wire fraud. A company with which the defendants were affiliated allegedly collected more than $26 million from "investors" without selling any product or service, and paid older investors with the proceeds of the money collected from the newer investors.
- In late 2003, a scheme by Bill Hickman Sr. and his son Bill Jr. was shut down. He had been selling unregistered securities that promised yields of up to 20 percent; more than $8 million was defrauded from dozens of residents of Pottawatomie County, Oklahoma, along with investors from as far away as California. Hickman Sr. was sentenced to eight years in state prison and Hickman Jr. to five years.
- In December 2004, Mark Drucker pleaded guilty to a Ponzi scheme in which he told investors that he would use their funds to buy and sell securities through a brokerage account. He claimed that he was making significant profits on his day trades and that he had opportunities to invest in select IPOs that were likely to turn a substantial profit in a short period of time, and promised guaranteed returns of up to fifty percent in 90 days or less. In less than two years of trading, Drucker actually lost more than $850,000 in day trading and had no special access to IPOs. He paid out more than $3.6 million to investors while taking in $6.3 million.
- In June 2005, in Los Angeles, California, John C. Jeffers was sentenced to 14 years in federal prison and ordered to pay $26 million in restitution to more than 80 victims. Jeffers and his confederate John Minderhout ran what they said was a high-yield investment program they called the "Short Term Financing Transaction". The funds were collected from investors around the world from 1996 through 2000. Some investors were told that proceeds would be used to finance humanitarian projects around the globe, such as low-cost housing for the poor in developing nations. Jeffers sent letters to some victims that falsely claimed the program had been licensed by the Federal Reserve and the program had a relationship with the International Monetary Fund and the United States Treasury. Jeffers and Minderhout promised investors profits of up to 4,000 percent. Most of the money collected in the scheme went to Jeffers to pay commissions to salespeople, to make payments to investors to keep the scheme going, and to pay his own personal expenses.
- In February 2006, Edmundo Rubi pleaded guilty to bilking hundreds of middle- and low-income investors out of more than $24 million between 1999 and 2001, when he fled the U.S. after becoming aware that he was under suspicion. The investors in the scheme, called "Knight Express", were told that their funds would be used to purchase and resell Federal Reserve notes, and were promised a six percent monthly return. Most of those bilked were part of the Filipino community in San Diego.
- On May 10, 2006, Spanish police arrested nine people associated with Forum Filatelico and Afinsa Bienes Tangibles in an apparent Ponzi scheme that affected 250,000 investors from 1998 to 2001. Investors were promised huge returns from investments in a stamp fund.
- In May 2006, U.S. Securities and Exchange Commission shut down Universo Foneclub, designed and owned by Sanderley Rodrigues de Vasconcelos (aka Sann Rodrigues). It was registered in the US and targeted the Brazilian community. Approximately 1500 people invested more than $3 million.
- On September 15, 2010, Nevin Shapiro pleaded guilty to a 2005–2009 Ponzi scheme in a Newark, New Jersey court. The scheme brought in approximately $880 million. Headquartered in Miami, the scheme was based on an import/export grocery business but was diverting investments to attract new investors. Among the items seized as a result of his plea were a $5 million Miami mansion and a yacht. He was known as "Lil Luke" because of his relationship with the Miami Hurricanes football team. This was a tribute to Luther Campbell, a famous former Hurricanes booster. On August 16, 2011, in a story broken by Yahoo Sports, Shapiro stated that his support of the team included cash, entertainment, prostitutes, and gifts, all against NCAA rules. For more details on Shapiro's involvement with the Miami program, see 2011 University of Miami athletics scandal.
- On January 27, 2017, the Securities and Exchanges Commission filed charges against Joseph Meli, saying he defrauded more than $97 million from 138 investors. The SEC alleged that the men promised double-digit returns re-selling high-priced tickets to popular Broadway musicals such as Hamilton.
- Between December 2017 and June 2022, David Kagel, an ex-attorney from California, and two other individuals promoted a fraudulent cryptocurrency automated trading Ponzi scheme estimated in about 9.5 million US Dollars.
- In September 2024, the Supreme Court of New South Wales sentenced Tony Iervasi to 11 years in prison for his role at one of the largest Ponzi schemes in Australia.

== See also ==
- Bucket shop (stock market)
- Finance
- Get-rich-quick scheme
- High-yield investment program
- Investment
- Land banking
- Lottery
- Matrix scheme
- Multi-level marketing
- Outline of finance
- Pyramid scheme
  - Holiday Magic
- Reed Slatkin
- Stock market
- Success University
