= Kubus =

Kubus may refer to:

== People ==
- Lukáš Kubus (born 1988), Slovak football forward
- Richard Kubus (1914–1987), German international footballer

== Other uses ==
- Kubuś, a Polish improvised fighting vehicle
- Kubus (company), a Polish food and drink company
- Kubus scheme, a scheme that originated in South Africa in the 1980s
- Kubus Mountain, a mountain in Queen Maud Land, Antarctica
