= Adie =

Adie is both a surname and a given name of Scottish origin, a medieval pet form of Adam. Notable people with the name include:

Surname:

- Alexander Adie (1775–1859), Scottish inventor, optician and meteorologist
- Alexander Adie (Australian pioneer) (1861–1940), pioneer of the sugar industry in Queensland
- George Adie (1901–1989), English architect
- John Adie (born 1930), Scottish footballer
- Kate Adie (born 1945), British journalist
- Lilias Adie (c. 1640–1704), Scottish prisoner
- Michael Adie (1929–2024), English Anglican bishop
- Norman Adie (born 1946), American film exhibitor and Ponzi schemer
- Pamela Adie (born 1984), Nigerian LGBT rights activist, public speaker, screenwriter and filmmaker
- Walter Sibbald Adie, (1872–1956) accountant-general in the Indian Civil Service
- William John Adie (1886–1935), British neurologist

Given name:

- Adie Allen (born 1966), British actress
- Adie Mike (born 1973), English football forward
- Adie Moses (born 1975), English footballer
- Adie Arsham Salleh (born 1988), Bruneian footballer
- Adie Smith (born 1973), English footballer
- Adie (Filipino singer) (born 2001), Filipino singer and songwriter

Fictional characters:

- Adie, The Sword of Truth, a fictional character in the epic fantasy series The Sword of Truth

== See also ==
- Adrienne Camp (born 1981), South African singer and songwriter
- Adie Inlet, Antarctica
- Adie syndrome, neurological disorder
