= Tommy Thomas (barrister) =

Malaysian barrister and the former Attorney General of Malaysia

Yang Berbahagia Tan Sri Tommy Thomas PSM
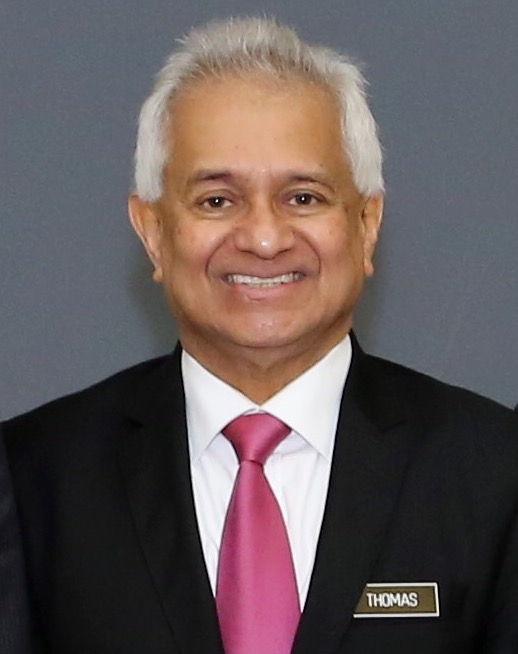

8th Attorney General of Malaysia
- In office 4 June 2018 – 28 February 2020
- Monarchs: Muhammad V Abdullah
- Prime Minister: Mahathir Mohamad
- Preceded by: Mohamed Apandi Ali
- Succeeded by: Idrus Harun

Personal details
- Born: 21 May 1952 (age 74) Kuala Lumpur, Federation of Malaya
- Citizenship: Malaysian
- Spouse: Anna Lype
- Education: Victoria Institution
- Alma mater: University of Manchester (LLB); London School of Economics (MSc)
- Profession: Barrister (Middle Temple, London)

Tommy Thomas (born Mohan s/o Keluthara Thomas; 21 May 1952) is a Malaysian barrister and the former Attorney General of Malaysia from 2018 to 2020. He was the first practising barrister to be appointed directly from the Malaysian Bar to be the Attorney General, and the first non-Malay and non-Muslim Malaysian to hold this post after the formation of Malaysia in 1963.

== Early life and education ==
Thomas was born to Keluthara and Vijayamma Thomas (Dr.) in Kuala Lumpur on 21 May 1952. His mother was an award-winning researcher in the faculty of medicine at the National University of Malaysia. Thomas graduated from Pasar Road English School and Victoria Institution. He read law at University of Manchester in 1973 and was called to the bar by Middle Temple in 1974. He has M.Sc. in International Relations from London School of Economics.

== Career ==
=== As a barrister ===
In 2001 and 2010, Thomas represented Pan-Malaysian Islamic Party (PAS)-led Terengganu and Kelantan governments in two separate lawsuits against Petronas over its failure to pay state oil royalty.

In 2007 and 2008, he acted for the Securities Commission Malaysia to obtain a landmark High Court judgement ordering the Swisscash operators to pay US$83 million for compensating the investors in the Swiss Mutual Fund, which is known as an Internet-based worldwide Ponzi scheme hatched in Malaysia.

In 2013 and 2014, he represented Penang government in its attempt to restore local government elections.

Further in 2016 and 2017, he represented 76 next of kin of the passengers on board MH370 to ask Malaysia Airlines to release 37 documents including investigative reports on the missing flight MH370.

Thomas was appointed Attorney General of Malaysia in 2018. He gave his first speech in Malay as Attorney General on 4 July and received many praises. The video of his speech went viral. On 28 February 2020, Thomas resigned as the Attorney General in response to the 2020 Malaysian political crisis. He submitted his resignation letter to interim Prime Minister, Mahathir Mohamad.

=== Other career ===
Thomas was a director of the Malaysian Institute of Corporate Governance from 1995 to 2001. He was appointed Senior Consultant to the Corporate Governance Initiative of the United Nations Development Programme in 2000. He was editor of the report Corporate Governance in Asia: Lessons from the Financial Crisis, published in 2002.

He is a life member of the Malaysian Economic Association and the Malaysian Branch of the Royal Asiatic Society.

== Controversies and issues ==
=== Appointment as the Attorney General ===
Thomas had previously represented Chin Peng, the leader of the Communist Party of Malaya (CPM), in a failed appeal to the government to allow his body to be buried in his hometown, Sitiawan. Prior to his nomination as the new attorney general, the issue was touted by detractors as one of many reasons why Malaysians should object his appointment. In spite of that, Thomas was appointed by the Yang di-Pertuan Agong as the attorney general which led to two online petitions with one in support and the other against Thomas' appointment. Subsequently, another petition was launched to urge the Agong to remove him from attorney general due to his poor command of the Malaysian language in wake of his request to the court that he be allowed to proceed in English when leading a prosecution against former Prime Minister Najib Razak.

However, Thomas has said that PAS may have helped him stay as attorney general, instead of resigning the next day after his appointment in June 2018. Previously, Thomas had suggested that he could have been attorney general for just a single day, due to Tun Dr Mahathir Mohamad's concern about the "scale and magnitude of the Malay opposition" to his appointment. Thomas reportedly said that Dr Mahathir that night changed his mind after PAS released a statement regarding the announcement earlier that day. “Apparently, a public statement issued by PAS that night that they had no objections to my appointment, especially since I had represented the PAS governments of Terengganu and Kelantan in their petroleum royalty cases against Petronas, had surprised Tun (Mahathir),” he was quoted saying in his prologue of his book.

=== Discrimination in exercise of discretion ===
Taking into consideration good relations between Indonesia and Malaysia, Thomas agreed to Indonesia's request for the release of Siti Aisyah, one of the two female suspects in Kim Jong-nam assassination, and allowed the passage of nolle prosequi by requesting the court to order a discharge not amounting to acquittal against Siti Aisyah. However, he rejected a plea by the second female suspect Doan Thi Huong to drop the murder charge against her despite a request for release from the Vietnamese government.

The different treatment towards the two suspects was perceived as discriminatory practice in the Malaysian judiciary system as the court had found a prima facie case against both Siti Aisyah and Doan. Ramkarpal Singh, the Malaysian Member of Parliament for Bukit Gelugor, stated that the refusal to withdraw the murder charge against the second suspect was "mind boggling and raises questions about the powers of the Attorney General". Similar views were also expressed by the newly elected Malaysian Bar President Abdul Fareed Abdul Gafoor, who stated that it was unusual for two individuals to be charged with the same crime but for one person to have her charge dropped and another remained charged.

In April 2019, the murder charge against Doan was dropped and replaced with a lesser charge of "voluntarily causing hurt by dangerous weapons or means". Doan pleaded guilty to the alternative charge and was sentenced to three years and four months in prison.

== Personal life ==
Thomas's daughter Hannah Thomas was a candidate for the Australian Greens party in the 2025 Australian federal election, running in the Sydney seat of Grayndler against the Australian prime minister, Anthony Albanese.

== Publications ==
Thomas has written two publications - Anything But the Law (Essays on Politics & Economics) and Abuse of Power (Selected Works on the Law and Constitution).

Launched simultaneously in 2016, both books contained collections of essays he had written over the past 34 years on the Federal Constitution, law, politics and economics and that had been published by online portals and by the Malaysian Bar.

His third book My Story: Justice in the Wilderness was launched in 2021. The book's theme about judiciary independence and corruption caused controversy in its early publication.

== Honours ==
- Malaysia
  - Commander of the Order of Loyalty to the Crown of Malaysia (PSM) – Tan Sri (2019)
