= Anubhav =

Anubhav may refer to these Indian films:

- Anubhav (1971 film), a Hindi film
- Anubhav (1986 film), a Bollywood romantic comedy
- Anubhav (2009 film), a Bollywood film

== See also ==
- Anubhava (film), a 1984 Indian film
- Anubhavam, a 1976 Indian film
- Anubhava Mantapa, religious complex in Karnataka, India
- Anubhav Plantations, an Indian company
