= Telexfree =

American multi-level marketing company

TelexFree Inc. (prev. Common Cents Communications Inc.)
- Type: Private
- Industry: Ponzi scheme, MLM
- Founded: February 2, 2012
- Founder: Carlos Roberto Costa, Carlos Nataniel Wanzeler and James Matthew Merrill
- Headquarters: Marlborough, Massachusetts, United States
- Area served: Worldwide
- Key people: List: James Matthew Merrill (President); Carlos Roberto Costa (Director); Carlos Nataniel Wanzeler (Director); Sanderley Rodrigues de Vasconcelos (Main Network Leader); Steve Labriola (Main Network Leader); Inocêncio Pereira Reis (Pelé Reis) (Main Network Leader); Marcus França (Main Network Leader)
- Products: 99TelexFREE (VoIP service)
- Number of employees: 7
- Divisions: Sister companies: TelexFree LLC; TelexFree LTD; TelexFree Canada Inc.; Ympactus Comercial Ltda

Telexfree (stylized as TelexFREE), a trade name owned by Telexfree Inc., was a multibillion-dollar Ponzi scheme disguised as an internet phone service company. Prosecutors have described it as the largest fraud of all time in terms of the number of people affected - more than 1 million, with victims in various countries. The brand became best known for its operations in Brazil held by Ympactus Comercial Ltda after it was involved in an ongoing investigation and trial for operating a Ponzi scheme, and later for having its operations suspended in the US by SEC under the charges of operating a multibillion-dollar Ponzi and pyramid scheme.

Telexfree Inc. owns the rights to the Telexfree brand worldwide. The company was created by Carlos Roberto Costa, Carlos Nataniel Wanzeler and James Matthew Merrill after the change of its former corporate name Common Cents Communications Inc., which was incorporated in Massachusetts. According to the Company Registration Office of Massachusetts, Telexfree Inc. started to use this corporate name on February 15, 2012.

Telexfree Inc. is a sister company of many other companies that operates TelexFree Marketing Plan, which belongs to the same founders and also share the same website. It includes a Brazilian company named "Ympactus Comercial Ltda", which was suspended in that country on June 13, 2013, by order of the court of Acre State.

Telexfree's Brazilian operations were regarded as one of the largest financial frauds in Brazil's history, according to Brazil's Ministry of Justice and the Federal Public Ministry. The number of investors (labelled as "promoters" by Telexfree) has not yet been determined; by the end of August 2013, just after companies' suspension, Company Director Carlos Roberto Costa said that the company had 1,049,619 active promoters in Brazil. The company fell under investigation by Brazilian authorities in January 2013, and fell under investigation of the United States District Court for District of Massachusetts on August 31st, 2022, which led the Court to freeze the company's and its owners' assets in Brazil and maintain, despite numerous appeals, the suspension of its operations in Brazil. Telexfree Brazil (Ympactus Comercial Ltda) denies the accusations, saying that it operates under the multi-level marketing structure, commercializing VoIP services. According to the Public Ministry (public prosecutor) of Acre State, the company’s assets were to remain frozen pending the outcome of proceedings. In September 2015, a court in Acre State convicted the company for operating a pyramid scheme.

Telexfree and BBOM, both companies suspected of operating Ponzi schemes and suspended by the Brazilian government, were featured among the top 10 most searched terms on Google during the year of 2013 in Brazil.

On April 13, 2014, Telexfree LLC filed a petition for relief under the U.S. bankruptcy code.

In April 2014, an investigation in the United States confirmed that Telexfree worked under a Ponzi scheme and handled more than $1 billion worldwide. The conclusion was made by SEC-MA, the agency that regulates the financial transactions in the company's home state of Massachusetts. SEC, in its Federal jurisdiction, also published a complaint against Telexfree INC, Telexfree LLC, the owners James Merrill and Carlos Wanzeler, marketing director Steve Labriola, as well as telexfree promoters Joseph Craft, Sanderley Rodrigues de Vasconcelos, Santiago de la Rosa, Randy N. Crosby and Faith R. Sloan.

== Telexfree case in Brazil ==
The Secretary for Economic Monitoring of the Brazilian Treasury Ministry (SEAE/MF) released the Memorandum 118/GABIN/SEAE/MF, on March 5, 2013, about Ponzi scheme activities carried on by Telexfree Brazilian subsidiary, "Ympactus Comercial Ltda". The memorandum triggered several investigations into the company's operations, leading Telexfree to hire Multi-level Marketing lawyer Gerald P. Nehra to review its marketing plan. Nehra is a lawyer who is known in the U.S. for defending closed down Ponzi and pyramid schemes, such as Zeek Rewards, Ad Surf Daily, Universo Foneclub and others.

On June 13, 2013, Telexfree's operations in Brazil were suspended. The company released a note on its website explaining the court's decision. The note says as follows (translated from the original Portuguese):

By judicial decision issued on June 13th, 2013, Judge Thais Queiroz B. de Oliveira Abou Khalil, in the records of the Preparatory Action No. 0005669-76.2013.8.01.0001, filed by the Prosecutor of the Acre State, in the 2nd Civil Court of Rio Branco - AC, new subscriptions to the Telexfree network are prohibited in the Partner or Promoter conditions; receiving of Returnable Deposit Funds and Costs of Reserve Position by Telexfree are forbidden; sales of 99Telexfree VoIP accounts in ADCentral and ADCentral Family modalities are prohibited; payments are prohibited, both to partners and promoters, of commissions, bonuses and any benefits derived from the Telexfree network (from sales of VoIP 99 Telexfree accounts, from new registration, ad postings, forming new direct or indirect binaries, royalty, Team Builder, among others which may be owed); that the breach of any of the above determinations will incur in the payment of a fine of R$ 100,000.00 (one hundred thousand Reais) for each new registration or re-registration and each improper payment.

— Telexfree Brazil, via a splash page on its website

In response to the seizure of the company's operations, Telexfree promoters protested throughout the country. On July 23, 2013, a group of protesting promoters in Brasília blocked operations at Juscelino Kubitscheck International Airport. Marcus França, one of Telexfree's top promoters, stated, "we won't go back to the hoe, like the system wants us to", referring to the labor of weeding grass commonly performed by lower class Brazilian countrymen. Immediately after blocking operations, Telexfree tried to divert US$88 million to other parent companies in Brazil, one of them named Worldxchange Intermediação de Negócios Ltda, belongs to Telexfree founder and director Carlos Nataniel Wanzeler.

In the last week of July, 2013, Telexfree decided to appeal again (regimental appeal) in Acre state, but Telexfree did not pay a U$20 fee in order to get the appeal accepted to be judged. The appeal was rejected by the judges of Tribunal de Justiça of Acre citing lack of payment and causing severe damage to the image of company lawyers before its promoters.

Also in July 2013, a lawyer from Rondonopolis, Mato Grosso, won in court the right to have his invested money returned; according to the decision of the court 3a Vara Cível, which ordered a Telexfree Brazilian company representative to reimburse him the amount of R$101,500 (about US$50,000. Later that month, the ninth appeal to reverse the ban on operations was dismissed, and weeks later the tenth appeal was also denied.

In an attempt to unfreeze its assets and continue operations, Telexfree offered the court its own brand as a guarantee of payment that according to the company was worth 660 million Brazilian reals or approximately US$300 million. The offer was refused and Telexfree remained suspended. Four months later, news reported rumours of logo plagiarism by the company (see section below).

In August 2013, Telexfree was fined by ANATEL, the Brazilian telecommunications regulatory agency, for lacking a license to provide VoIP services in the country. ANATEL released a public statement saying, "Offering Services of Internet Connections (SCI), which is a value-added service defined in Article 61 of the General Law of Telecommunications (LGT), regardless of which medium or technology used, such as dial-up connection, radio frequency, cable, among others, it must be associated with a telecommunications service properly regulated by ANATEL".

After 13 attempts to overturn the injunction that shut down its operations in Brazil, Ympactus Comercial Ltda declared bankruptcy on September 20, 2013, when judicial recovery was requested in the court Vara de Recuperação Empresarial e Falência of Vitória. This request focused on releasing the company's assets and paying its debtors, according to a bankruptcy plan presented to the Ministry of Justice. According to Carlos Roberto Costa, company director, in a video, the company will only pay to its investors the money that they have in their back-office and not the total money invested. The court immediately blocked this maneuver to protect company assets and guarantee the maximum "pro-rata" amount would be returned to its investors when the time came.

In November 2013, as a last attempt to avoid auditing in its operations, Telexfree in Brazil tried to arrange a mediation with Brazilian legal authorities and return to business. The meeting was held in Rio Branco, Acre state capital, but the company and the Ministry of Justice did not reach an agreement. Following this, the company began undergoing an audit, done by BDO, and the findings will be sent to Acre's public prosecutors to analyze. After the mediation meeting ended, the Telexfree promoter Flávio Arraz was arrested, being accused of insulting the public prosecutor of the case, Alessandra Marques, calling her "Blond Devil".

Two cases of suicide linked to the stoppage of the company have been reported in the Brazilian newspapers.

In September 2015, the company was convicted by the Justice of Acre State for operating a Pyramid Scheme.

=== Issues with insurance companies ===
In early June 2013, the insurance company Liberty Seguros released a note on its website, in response to statements made by Telexfree representatives that both companies had started a partnership:

Liberty Seguros informs that has no partnership with the company Telexfree. The announcement disclosed, pointing Liberty Seguros as its business partner, is unfounded and constitutes false advertising. Liberty Seguros sells insurance only in partnership with brokers duly registered in SUSEP (Superintendence of Private Insurance). Any offer of Telexfree products or services in the name of Liberty Seguros should be disregarded.

— Liberty Seguros, via its newsletter

On July 21, 2013, right after the Acre State Court cautionary injunction, director Carlos Costa released a video presenting an alleged contract between TelexFree and insurance company Mapfre Seguros, supposedly guaranteeing TelexFree affiliate's investments and the company's suitability. "Your business will be ensured. You, who was 100% Telexfree, will also be 100% safe", Costa says in video. "Would you think that Mapfre would do a insurance of something that was not 100% legal? Of course not. So here's it for you to see. People, [this] is the legality of our company." In response, Mapfre released a note on its website, stating the contract was false:

Mapfre Seguros advises that does not have any business relationship or partnership with Telexfree and Ympactus Comercial Ltda companies. The dissemination of information that is suggesting a contractual obligation between the group insurance with these companies is not true. There was only a receiving of documents to study an insurance proposal, which was not executed. Mapfre Seguros also informs that it will take appropriate legal action for misuse of its brand and all damage eventually caused. We also point out that in the portfolio of Mapfre Seguros Guarantee there is not a product that ensures the company, under the conditions disclosed".

— Mapfre Seguros, via its website

=== Public prosecutor and judge death threats ===
The Public Prosecutor of the Telexfree case, Alessandra Marques, and the Judge of 2nd Civil Court, Thais Queiroz B. de Oliveira Abou Khalil, have reported death and kidnapping threats after the court's decision to freeze Telexfree assets and operations in Brazil. According with the Public Ministry, those threats arrived through e-mails, phone calls and online posting done by Telexfree promoters.

GAECO (Special Action Group to Combat Organized Crime) and the police started to investigate the threats and some suspects have been identified. Since these threats began, the police have been assigned to provide protection to the Judge and Public Ministry Prosecutor.

In December 2013, the Public Ministry issued an official statement denying the false information that Alessandra Marques, Telexfree case prosecutor, had been supposedly killed and that her body had been found by the police. The Public Ministry asked for a criminal investigation against the authors of the rumours, understanding that this practice is a "virtual terrorism" and "an attempt to coerce and intimidate the public prosecutors in its relevant challenge to defend the interests of society" The note concludes by stating that "given the gravity of the fact presented here, the Public Ministry calls on all its members to remain united around the ideals that guide the institution and not to be intimidated by any threat, recalling that only two species of people fear the actions of the Public Ministry: the ignorant, who do not know it; and the criminals, who know it too well".

In a December 2013 interview regarding her tenor as General Prosecutor for the Brazilian Public Ministry, Patrícia Rêgo said:

Regarding to Telexfree, this case was to close the year with a flourish. Prosecutors [participating in the investigation] are 100% convinced that it is a Pyramid Scheme. In addition the false news about the death of Public Prosecutor from Acre Public Ministry, Alessandra Marques, hurt me a lot. You don't play with something like that. The Public Ministry is investigating and will give a pedagogic answer to the society.

— Patricia Rêgo, via Gazeta Interview

== Telexfree case in the US ==
Telexfree has its worldwide operations, excluding Brazil, operated by Telexfree LLC Brazilian operations are held by Ympactus Comercial Ltda. The owners of Telexfree Inc.—Carlos Roberto Costa, Carlos Nataniel Wanzeler and James Matthew Merrill—also have companies in the UK, named TelexFree Ltd and in Canada, named TelexFree Canada Inc.

In April 2014, Telexfree's US business unraveled amid accusations by the US government and regulators in Massachusetts that the company was a massive pyramid scheme. Telexfree's US assets were frozen on April 16, and it declared bankruptcy two days later. Co-owner James Merrill was arrested, and Carlos Wanzeler fled to his native Brazil. Carlos Wanzeler's wife Katia Wanzeler was arrested in the airport in New York while trying to board a plane heading to Brazil. Authorities said the company claimed to provide Internet telephone services, but actually made money only from the fees paid by investors, who were told they would be paid for approving ads that would allegedly appear on the Internet.

In October 2016, Merrill pleaded guilty to one count of wire fraud conspiracy and eight counts of wire fraud in U.S. District Court in Worcester. He was sentenced on March 22, 2017, by U.S. District Court Judge Timothy S. Hillman to six years in prison and three years of supervised release, and agreed to forfeit approximately $140 million along with numerous real estate properties, luxury vehicles, and boats. Carlos Wanzeler remained a fugitive, having fled to Brazil before charges were filed, and the United States continued extradition efforts.

== Telexfree operations in other countries ==
In Dominican Republic two local TV Channels, TV Color Vision and TV Teleuniverso, reported that Telexfree launched in August 2013 its marketing plan in the country in an event where Carlos Wanzeler, Sanderley Rodrigues (Sann Rodrigues) and Steve Labriola where present. The company was promoting its business model saying that people would get a high rate of return on their investment without sales requirements. Furthermore, the Color Vision investigation showed that Telexfree does not have a local office or authorization to sell VoIP services in the country and their office in Massachusetts is only a virtual one.

In November 2013, a Colombian magazine released an article about Telexfree operations in Colombia comparing its method of operation and the high rate of return with other local broken Ponzi schemes, D.M.G. Grupo Holding S.A. and Proyecciones D.R.F.E., that had previously affected the country's economy.

According with news by Peruvian Press in December 2013, World Capital Market 777 (WCM777), a recently shut-down Ponzi scheme based in Hong Kong, and Telexfree LLC, had their operations prohibited by Superintendencia de Banca, Seguros y AFP (SBS) in Peru. Peruvian authorities asked the population to report any local operations from both companies to the National Police and the Public Ministry in order to close the schemes.

== Connections with other operations ==
Regardless of its operations worldwide, Telexfree was developed on the same basis as the Ponzi scheme named Universo Foneclub, designed and owned by now Telexfree promoter Sanderley Rodrigues de Vasconcelos (aka Sann Rodrigues). Universo Foneclub was registered in the US and targeted the Brazilian community. It was shut down by the U.S. Securities and Exchange Commission in May 2006.

== Logo plagiarism controversy ==
Telexfree and Yonex BWF World Championships Paris 2010 logos

In November 2013, Telexfree, which started its operations in 2011, was accused of having plagiarized its brand identity from 2010 BWF World Championships because of the striking resemblance between the logos.

After this episode, Telexfree and the logo's designer Vixmais Soluções (a company that belongs to one of Telexfree promoters Dilhermano Gonçalves) announced its re-branding without any official explanations about the case or any legal action brought by the logo owner Badminton World Federation or the marketing agency responsible for the creation (Taïo Design Consulting).

== Government documents ==
- Telexfree INC - Massachusetts Company Official Register
- Telexfree LLC - Massachusetts Company Official Register
- Telexfree Canada Inc. - Canada Corporations
- SEC Shutdown Report - Universo Foneclub
- SEC Litigation Release No. 20127 / May 23rd, 2007 - Universo Foneclub
- Memorandum 118/GABIN/SEAE/MF from SEAE/MF Brazil about Ponzi Scheme activities of Telexfree Brazilian subsidiary - in Portuguese.
- ANATEL Supervision Report - in Portuguese.
- SEC Investor Alert: Beware of Pyramid Schemes Posing as Multi-Level Marketing Programs
- SEC-MA Telexfree Administrative Complaint
- SEC Telexfree case report

MDL 2566 In re TelexFree Securities Litigation consolidated all civil claims by the victims of this Pyramid scheme into one Federal court docket. Robert J Bonsignore, Esq was appointed Lead Counsel.

== See also ==
- Ympactus Comercial Ltda - Portuguese Wikipedia page
- List of Ponzi schemes
- High-yield investment program
- Direct selling
- IM Academy
