= EKC =

EKC may refer to:

- Eastern Karnic language
- Eastman Kodak Company
- Environmental Kuznets curve
- Epidemic Keratoconjunctivitis, a viral eye infection
- Essendon Keilor College, in Victoria, Australia
- European Kendo Championships
- European Kings Club, a Ponzi scheme
