= Donald Anthony Walker Young =

Donald Anthony Walker Young, who is known as Tony Young or Walker Young, was the owner of Acorn Investments and Acorn II L.P.. He was indicted, pleaded guilty and was sentenced for running a $25 million Ponzi scheme.

Young was raised in Fitzgerald, Georgia. He used a fabricated life story to work his way into the Atlanta and then the Chester County, Pennsylvania, polo scene, where he met many of his victims. Before being shaken and ultimately brought down by a $20 million withdrawal of funds in 2008, prior to his indictment, Young also acquired vacation homes in Northeast Harbor, Maine and Palm Beach, Florida and encountered prospective and ultimate victims in these locales as well. He pleaded guilty in July, 2010, to mail fraud and money laundering. In May, 2011, he was sentenced to 17 1/2 years in prison.

== See also ==
List of Ponzi schemes
