= Hannah Thomas =

Australian political candidate and activist

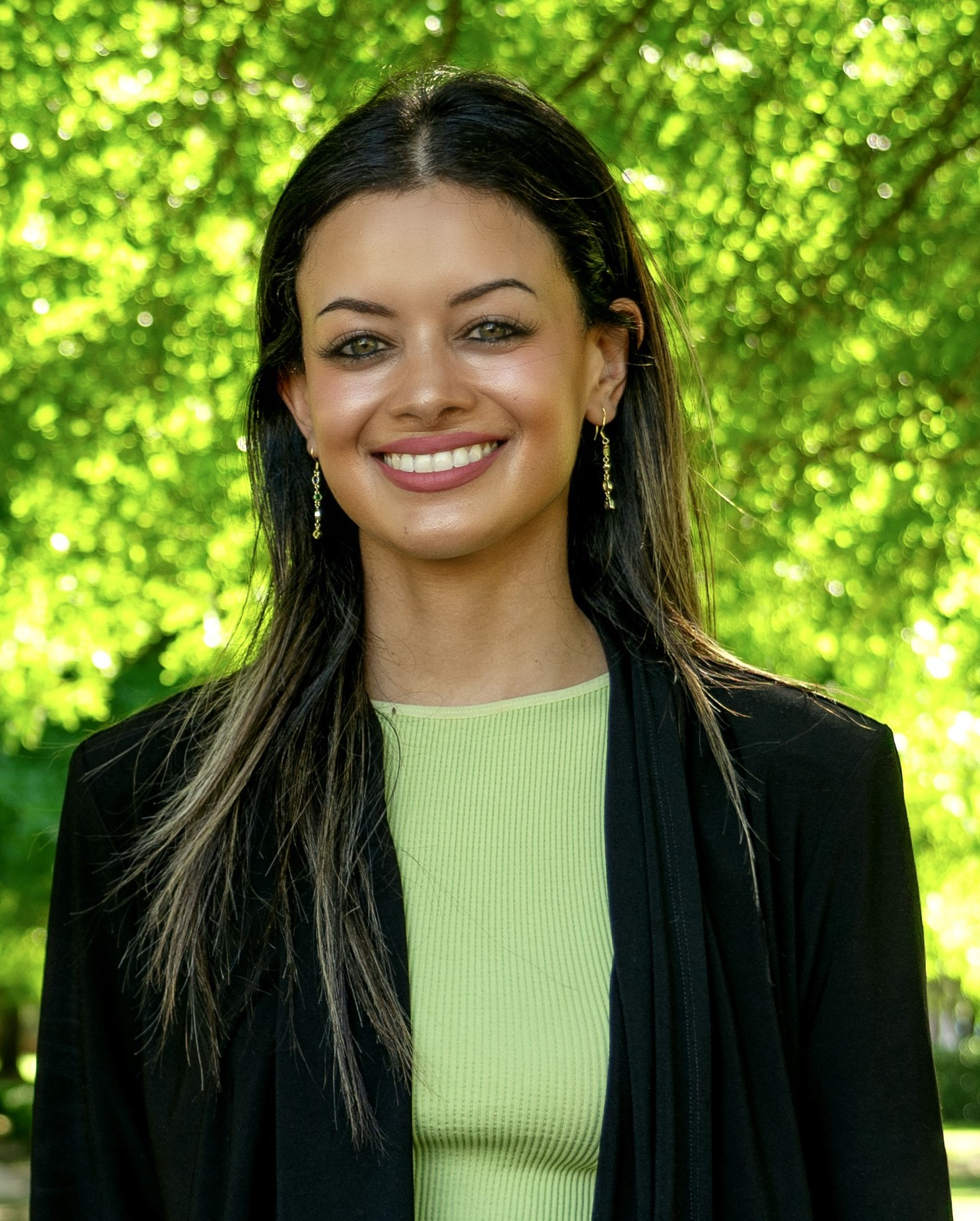
Hannah Thomas

Hannah Thomas is a Malaysian Australian lawyer, activist, and former political candidate for the Australian Greens. In the 2025 election, she contested the federal seat of Grayndler, the seat held by Prime Minister Anthony Albanese. In June 2025, she garnered media attention after she was punched by a member of the NSW police at a pro-Palestine protest, resulting in permanent injury to her right eye.

== Early life and education ==
Thomas was born and grew up in Malaysia and moved to Australia in 2009 as an international student. Her father, Tommy Thomas, is a former Attorney General of Malaysia. Her paternal grandmother, Vijayamma Thomas, was a researcher in the faculty of medicine at the University of Malaysia. Her paternal grandparents migrated to Malaysia from the Indian district of Pathanamthitta after World War II.

== Political career ==
In the 2025 federal election, Thomas received 25.11% of first-preference votes in the Division of Grayndler, located in inner-Sydney. This was a positive swing of 4.18% and the Greens' second-ever highest result in the electorate. She ultimately received 33.14% of the two-candidate-preferred result against Australian Prime Minister Anthony Albanese.

== Activism ==
Thomas received media attention in June 2025 whilst protesting outside SEC plating in Belmore, Sydney, alleging that the company was manufacturing components used in F-35 fighter jets in Israel. She was originally arrested on charges of hindering or resisting a police officer and refusing to comply with a direction to disperse. During her arrest, Senior Constable Christopher David punched Thomas in her right eye, causing immediate bleeding and swelling. It was later alleged by her lawyer that this strike ruptured her eyeball and fractured her eye socket. She required three rounds of surgery, and suffers permanent eye damage.

Three months after the incident, the Director of Public Prosecutions dropped all charges against Thomas. She was subsequently awarded $22,000 in legal costs in response to these decisions. In June 2026, it was conceded by NSW that her treatment by police constituted both battery and false imprisonment, and the state accepted that she was entitled to damages and offered to pay her medical costs.
