= 1040 Sunshine Project =

Chinese pyramid scheme

1040 Sunshine Project (Chinese: 1040陽光工程) is an illegal pyramid scheme or multi-level marketing in China. It is a variation of Ponzi scheme. It originated in Beihai City, Guangxi Zhuang Autonomous Region since 1998.

== Details ==
It is a money-dividing scheme. The new member paid a net fee of 69,800 yuan, and then returned the new person 19,000 yuan, the remaining 50,800 yuan, will undergo layer-by-layer exploitation. The direct referee with a newcomer will be awarded 6612 yuan. On the upper line of the upper layer, as an indirect recommender, you can get 1520 yuan. Going up to the manager level, from the bottom up, the generation of managers got 6384 yuan. The second-generation manager was awarded 2,394 yuan, and the third-generation manager was awarded 1,596 yuan. After the remaining money, allocated to the ranks of the old master, the generation of bosses of the second generation of the three generations of the bosses each received 10,500 yuan. At this point, the remaining 794 yuan will be intercepted as regional operating funds. From the direct recommender to the three generations of bosses, the income of all people must be deducted 10% of the management fee, and will be intercepted and used by the regional chief. It is claimed that the member can obtain a profit of 10.4 million yuan.

== Techniques involve ==
- Brainwashing
- Stockholm syndrome

== See also ==
- List of Ponzi schemes
