= Parasrampuria =

Parasrampura
- village
- Country: India
- State: Rajasthan

Languages
  - Official: Hindi
- Time zone: UTC+5:30 (IST)
- ISO 3166 code: RJ-IN

Parasrampura is a tiny village 20 km southwest of Nawalgarh town in Jhunjhunu District of Indian State of Rajasthan. It has some of the oldest and the best preserved Shekhawati paintings in the region.
