= Kubus (brand) =

Fruit and vegetable juice producer

Kubus (Polish: Kubuś [ˈku.buɕ]), also known as Kubie in South Africa, is a brand of juice producer, owned by Maspex, and based in Poland. It produces fruit and vegetable juices, drinks, mousses, bottled water, cookies, and others. Its production line is based in Olsztynek, while bottling company in Tychy, both located in Poland.

The company is the leading producer of puree juices in countries of Poland, Romania, Russia, Bulgaria, Hungary, Lithuania, Czechia, Slovakia, and others. It has been noted on the Rzeczpospolita Ranking of the Most Valuable Brands.

== International marketing ==
The trademark is present in numerous countries, in which it sells its products with the same formula, but under different names. It is present in the countries of: Austria, Albania, Belarus, Bosnia and Herzegovina, Bulgaria, Czechia, Denmark, Estonia, Finland, France, Germany, Greece, Hungary, Iran, Iraq, Italy, Latvia, Lithuania, Luxemburg, the Netherlands, North Macedonia, Norway, Poland, Portugal, Romania, Russia, Serbia, Slovakia, Slovenia, Spain, the South Africa, Sweden, Switzerland, Turkey, Ukraine, the United Kingdom, and the United States.

The different name is used for the trademark in various regions. The list consist of:

- Armin in Philippines,
- Cubada in Catalonia (Spain),
- Cubuca in Portugal,
- Cubuso in Spain (excluding Catalonia),
- Dedi in France,
- Kubak in Slovenia,
- Kubas in Denmark, Norway and Sweden,
- Kubie in Luxemburg, the Netherlands, and the South Africa,
- Kubik in Albania,
- Kubík in Czechia and Slovakia,
- Kubiko in Finland and Estonia
- Kubos in Greece,
- Kubu in Hungary,
- Kubus in Austria, Germany, Switzerland, the United Kingdom, and the United States,
- Kubuś in Lithuania, and Poland,
- Teddo in Italy,
- Tedi in Belarus, Bulgaria, and Romania, and Turkey,
- Tedi (Cyrillic: Теди) in Russia and Ukraine,
- Tedis in Latvia,
- Tedko in Bosnia and Herzegovina, North Macedonia, and Serbia,
- Teduks in Iran, and Iraq.

== Awards ==
- Towar Roku 2004 (Product of the Year 2004) by Marketing w Praktyce
- Najlepszy Produkt (The Best Product) in Wybór Konsumentów 2015 (Consumer Choice 2015), by Wiadomości Handlowe
- Złoty paragon 2016 (Golden Receipt 2016) by Perły Rynku FMCG
- Hit Handlu (Trade Hit) by Handel
