= Sarah Howe (fraudster) =

American fraudster (c. 1826–1892)

- Born: c. 1826
- Died: January 26, 1892 (aged 65–66); Boston, Massachusetts, U.S.
- Resting place: Forest Hills Cemetery, Jamaica Plain, Boston
- Occupation(s): Fraudster, fortune teller
- Known for: Ponzi schemes, including Ladies' Deposit Company of Boston
- Spouse(s): Florimund L. Howe (m. 1852) (and possibly two earlier marriages)

Sarah Emily Howe (c. 1826 – January 26, 1892) was an American fraudster who operated several Ponzi schemes—although her schemes predated namesake Charles Ponzi by several decades—in the 1870s and 1880s. Her most well-known deception was the Ladies' Deposit Company of Boston. Howe was arrested in 1880 and imprisoned for three years for fraud. Upon her release, she repeated similar frauds until she was arrested again in 1888.

== Early life ==
The details of Howe's early life are uncertain. Newspaper accounts gave inconsistent reports of her age, suggesting she may have been born as early as 1820 or as late as 1827. The Boston Herald claimed she was born in Providence, Rhode Island. A reported early marriage to a man named James Solomon may have been annulled due to miscegenation, followed by a marriage to a second man who subsequently died. Many of these details came from sources hostile to Howe and are difficult to confirm.

In 1852, she married Florimund L. Howe in Manchester, New Hampshire. After the American Civil War, the couple moved to Boston, Massachusetts, where she worked as a fortune teller and in various other occupations, some of them criminal. She spent several weeks in jail in 1875 after taking out multiple loans secured with the same collateral, but her conviction was overturned on appeal.

== Ladies' Deposit Company ==
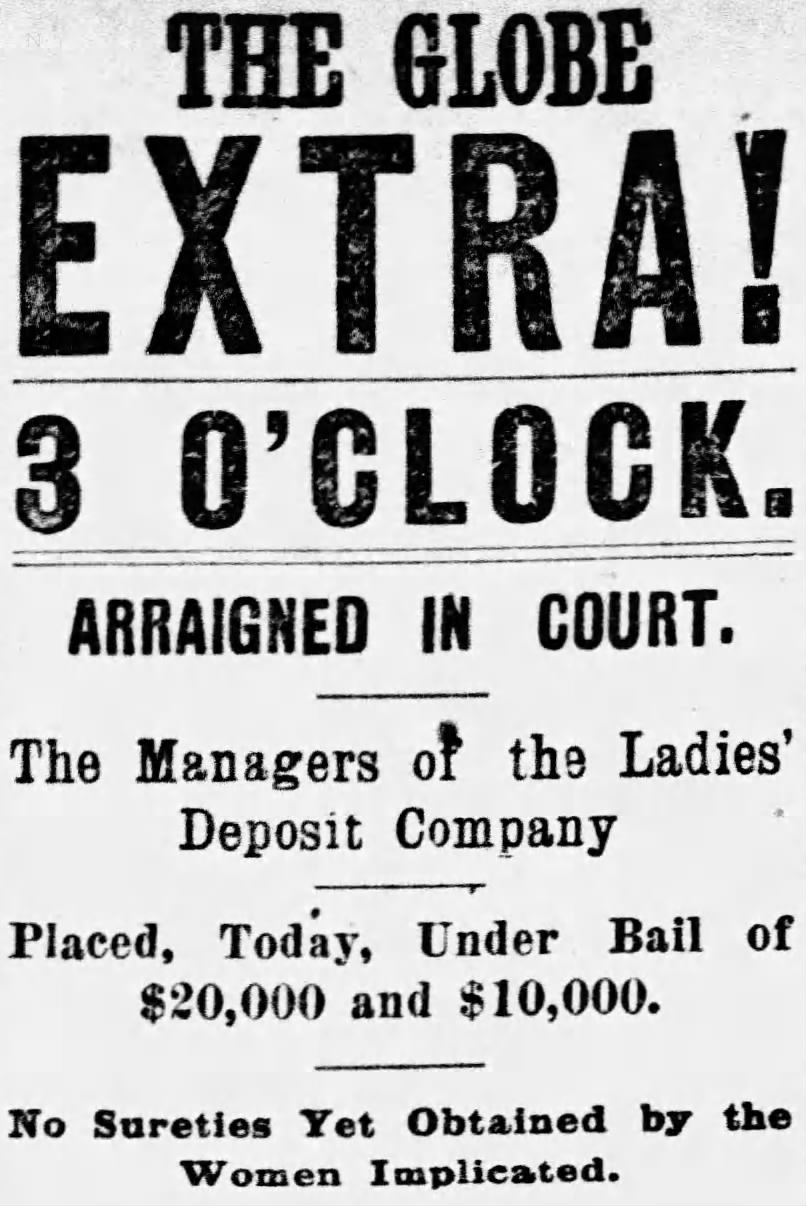
Headline in The Boston Weekly Globe of October 18, 1880

Howe opened the Ladies' Deposit Company sometime before April 1879 (Note: Historian George Robb gives 1878 as the year the bank was established. A contemporary account by journalist Henry A. Clapp states that the earliest documented deposit was made April 1, 1879, and the earlier history of the bank is uncertain due to a lack of reliable sources.) as a savings bank that accepted deposits only from unmarried women. She told depositors that the bank worked with a Quaker charity that wanted to help women of modest means. She promised a very high interest rate on the deposits, initially described as two percent per week, which was later adjusted to eight percent per month. In fact there was no such charity and Howe relied on new deposits to pay the interest on older ones. Howe did not advertise the bank, but was able to attract $500,000 (equivalent to $16,873,214 in 2024) in deposits from about 1200 women in cities as far away as Chicago and Washington by relying on referrals from her depositors.

In September 1880, the Boston Daily Advertiser began publishing articles attacking the Ladies' Deposit as a swindle, which led to a run on the bank by its depositors. By October the scheme had collapsed and Howe was charged with multiple counts of fraud. She was convicted and served three years in prison.

== Later life ==
After her release in 1884, Howe set up another fraudulent bank, the Women's Bank. The new bank operated on the same principles as the Ladies' Deposit, but promised a slightly lower interest rate of seven percent per month. She accepted an estimated $50,000 in deposits before the new fraud was exposed in April 1887. Howe fled Boston before she could be indicted.

Howe attempted similar schemes in other cities, including one in Chicago under the name Ladies Provident Aid. She returned to Boston where she was arrested in December 1888, but she was released in March 1889 because victims were unwilling to participate in her prosecution. She returned to fortune telling until her death in Boston on January 26, 1892. She was buried in Forest Hills Cemetery in the Jamaica Plain neighborhood of Boston, with the burial fee of $5 ($175.00 in 2024) paid by a stranger.
