= Hunter Brian Hanson =

American businessman

- Born: 1997 (age 28–29)
- Occupation: Former businessman
- Known for: Operating a Ponzi scheme defrauding grain farmers
- Status: Convicted
- Motive: Personal enrichment, lavish lifestyle
- Conviction: July 30, 2019 (guilty plea)
- Criminal charges: Wire fraud money laundering
- Penalty: 8 years in prison ordered to pay over $11 million in restitution

Details
- Victims: Grain farmers in North Dakota and Canada
- Imprisoned at: Yes

Hunter Brian Hanson is an American former businessman noted for operating a Ponzi scheme that defrauded grain farmers. He was 22 years old when he was convicted of fraud and money laundering.

== Biography ==
Hanson was considered an "entrepreneurial wonder" at a young age. He completed high school in 2015 and started working at a grain elevator. Hanson struck out on his own when he was 20 and registered seven businesses in North Dakota. He reportedly wrote a $30,000 check to buy a car while promoting grain trading businesses. The story he circulated was that he inherited money from his grandparents and used the proceeds to establish his trading businesses, including Midwest Grain Trading Company and Nodak Grain. He first introduced the former as a "roving grain buyer". Nodak Grain began operating in 2018 with a warehouse license and rural facilities.

Hanson defrauded grain farmers by purchasing crops at a price above the per-bushel market value and selling them below market value. This Ponzi scheme was carried out by taking money from one investor to pay another. As a result, both Midwest Grain Trading and NoDak Grain accumulated $8 million in unpaid bills.

Authorities had investigated where all of the money Hanson bilked went. It was reported that he lived an expensive lifestyle. He traveled with his girlfriend to Paris, bought steam threshing equipment, and purchased high-end vehicles. Hanson also founded a used car business called Hanson Motors. He allegedly used this company to launder part of the $11.2 million he was supposed to pay the 60 farmers he defrauded. He also had eleven bank accounts, which he used to launder money between his businesses.

=== Conviction ===
In 2018, the North Dakota Public Service Commission closed Hanson's businesses after receiving complaints from farmers and his other victims. It was also found that he was granted a license without grain marketing training or experience. He was arrested on April 4, 2019. On July 30 of the same year, Hanson pled guilty to wire fraud and money laundering charges. He admitted to defrauding North Dakota and Canada victims. He was sentenced to eight years in prison and was ordered to pay back more than $11 million in restitution.
