= Alexander Adie (Australian pioneer) =

Australian businessman (1861 – 1940)

- Born: 1861; Childers, Queensland, Australia
- Died: 18 July 1940 (aged 78–79)
- Occupations: Sugar industry pioneer, farmer
- Known for: Pioneer of the sugar industry in Childers; chairman of the Isis Central Sugar Mill Company

Alexander Adie (1861 – 18 July 1940) was a pioneer of the sugar industry in Childers, Queensland where he was born, and the third chairman of the Isis Central Sugar Mill Company. From 1897 till 1939 Adie kept a work diary or farm production record. Fifteen of his diaries have survived, being rescued as they were on their way to the local tip. They provide a record of farm life in the late 19th century and in particular, the recruitment and employment of South Sea Islanders known then as Kanakas. Adie used his diaries to keep a tally of work done by his Kanakas or contract gangs in order to know how much pay was needed for each person.
