= Tony Iervasi =

Fraudster

- Years active: 2008-2017
- Organization: Courtenay House
- Known for: Running one of the largest Ponzi schemes in Australia

Tony Iervasi is a former company director and convicted fraudster known for being the sole director and shareholder of Courtenay House, a Ponzi scheme which raised approximately 180 million Australian Dollars and was quoted as one of the largest Ponzi schemes in Australia. In September 2024 he was sentenced in the Supreme Court of New South Wales to 11 years imprisonment and will not be eligible for parole for at least seven years.

== Courtenay House ==
The Courtenay House companies, located in Bondi Junction, New South Wales, assured investors that their funds would be invested in Forex and Futures markets, but in reality, only about three percent of the funds were actually traded. Instead, the monthly returns paid to investors were funded by capital from new investors, being the typical Ponzi strategy.

Courtenay House started operations during the 2008 financial crisis, and Iervasi, despite demonstrating little knowledge of the foreign exchange market, was effective in convincing people to invest by keeping a luxurious lifestyle that included expensive cars and overseas trips.

Complaints about the scheme were raised to the Australian Securities and Investments Commission as early as 2012 but they were not acted upon.

Among the fraudulent activities, Iervasi offered investors alleged special market opportunities tied to the 2016 United States presidential election. In 2017, the Australian Securities and Investments Commission froze the company's assets, leading to an investigation. Iervasi, after reporting a kidnapping in 2019, admitted to running the scheme.

Athan Papoulias, a contractor who promoted investments at Courtenay House, was sentenced in 2023 to two years' jail for carrying on an unlicensed financial services business between 2 November 2016 and 21 April 2017, “reckless about the fact that the business did not have the required licence.” David Sipina, involved in marketing and promoting Courtenay House, also pleaded guilty to criminal charges, including dealing with the proceeds of crime. Neither were alleged to have known it was a Ponzi scheme.

It is estimated that the Ponzi scheme had 585 victims in total.
