= IM Academy =

American online investment company

- Formerly: iMarketsLive, IML, IM Mastery Academy, IMMA
- Industry: Online finance courses
- Founder: Christopher Terry
- Revenue: $1 billion (2022)
- Website: https://iyovia.com/

IM Academy (rebranded to IYOVIA in November 2024; previously known as iMarketsLive, IML, IM Mastery Academy and IMMA) is an American company that sells online courses about investments to young audiences. It was founded by former Amway sales manager Christopher Terry.

The company has been described as a pyramid scheme by several authorities across a number of countries.

== History ==
According to a May 2025 complaint filed by the FTC and the Nevada Attorney General's office, IM Academy has employed instructors with no formal education and scammed its clients out of $1.2 billion since 2018. The complaint stated that the organization has mostly targeted young African-Americans and Latinos in the United States. In 2018, the company was fined $150,000 by the CFTC for trading for its customers while not being a registered brokerage.

Spain's National Securities Market Commission published a warning in 2018 stating that iMarketsLive was not authorized to do business in the country. After the company rebranded to IM Academy, the commission published another warning in 2020, this time mentioning the company by the new name. In 2022, eight employees of the company were arrested by the Spanish National Police under suspicion of using misleading advertisements in order to lure adolescents into a pyramid scheme.

IM Academy provides access to its online courses for a monthly fee, although students can be relieved of their duty to pay if they recruit two other students. As of 2022, its annual sales revenue was at over $1 billion, with about 500,000 members across the world. In 2023, some IM Academy employees were arrested by police in Luxembourg as the company was being investigated for allegedly leading young people into dropping out of school and lacking a permit to conduct business. In France, a warning published by the IMF in 2017 stated that IM Academy had been targeting people as young as high schoolers. IM Academy is banned in Belgium and its representatives were fined in Poland for operating a pyramid scheme. According to his website, Terry, the founder of the company, "has no formal education".
