= Mantria Corporation Ponzi scheme =

Ecologically-focused investment scandal

The Mantria Corporation Ponzi scheme has been described as the "biggest green energy scam" in United States history. A Federal judge in the Securities and Exchange Commission's civil case found Mantria had scammed more than $54.5 million “by egregiously, recklessly, knowingly, and shamelessly perpetrating a fraudulent scheme” that used “misrepresentations, omissions, and blatant lies to induce unsuspecting and unwitting victim investors to liquidate the equity in their homes and take out bank loans to invest in Defendants’ scheme, which was nothing more than smoke and mirrors.” On November 16, 2009, the U.S. Securities and Exchange Commission charged four people who targeted those nearing retirement age who were seeking real estate and "green" investments. Many of these securities were offered by Mantria Corporation.

The SEC said Mantria's environmental and real estate initiatives had not generated any significant profits, and returns paid to investors had been funded from other investors' contributions. They targeted those nearing retirement age to finance the "green" initiatives of Mantria Corporation, such as a “carbon negative” housing community in rural Tennessee, waste-to-energy plants, and a “biochar” charcoal substitute made from organic waste. Mantria Corporation operated using 55 different LLCs in the scheme, which made it very difficult for investigators to follow the funds.

== Mantria Corporation ==
Mantria Corporation described itself in numerous press releases and on the web as a $128 million company focusing on green community development, socially responsible investing, distressed real estate fund management, mortgage banking, renewable energy, music and entertainment and philanthropy. Mantria also described its foundation called Mantria Green – a set of pioneering principles for developing premium land and real estate with carbon emission offsetting and environmentally conscious design. Some of the companies Mantria operated as include: Mantria Corporation, Mantria Industries, Eternagreen, Carbon Diversion, Mantria Realty, Mantria Communities, Mantria Investments, Mantria Records, EternaGreen Global, Earthmate Technologies, Eternagreen Capital, Clean Energy Components and many others. Based outside of Philadelphia in Bala Cynwyd, Pennsylvania, Mantria Corporation had additional offices in Tennessee and Florida.

== Mantria & Speed of Wealth, LLC. ==
Mantria offered its investments primarily through Speed of Wealth, LLC and its principals,

== Mantria Ponzi scheme ==
On November 16, 2009, the U.S. Securities and Exchange Commission charged four people who targeted those nearing retirement age who were seeking real estate and “green” (environmentally-friendly) investments. Many of these securities were offered by Mantria Corporation.

The SEC said Mantria's environmental and real estate initiatives had not generated any significant profits, and returns paid to investors had been funded from other investors' contributions.

In July 2011, Denver’s 5280 Magazine wrote about Mantria and Speed of Wealth in "The Biggest Green Scam in America".

On August 5, 2011, after nearly 21 months, Federal Judge Arguello ruled the Mantria case a ponzi scheme. Arguello called Mantria a Ponzi scheme operating with "sociopathic greed". The judge was to the point in stating that Mantria scammed more than $54.5 million “by egregiously, recklessly, knowingly, and shamelessly perpetrating a fraudulent scheme” that used “misrepresentations, omissions, and blatant lies to induce unsuspecting and unwitting victim investors to liquidate the equity in their homes and take out bank loans to invest in Defendants’ scheme, which was nothing more than smoke and mirrors.”

On September 3, 2015, the Department of Justice charged three people affiliated with the Mantria Ponzi scheme. Those accused are Mantria Corporation founders and executives Troy Wragg and Amanda Knorr, as well as unlicensed securities broker Wayde McKelvy. The charges included conspiracy to commit wire fraud, conspiracy to commit securities fraud, securities fraud and seven counts of wire fraud. In Georgia Troy Wragg had been arrested and Wayde McKelvy was arrested in Colorado. Amanda Knorr turned herself in at a later date.

On May 24, 2016, Amanda Knorr pleaded guilty to two charges of conspiracy, seven counts of wire fraud and one count of securities fraud. Knorr could have received a maximum prison sentence of 240 years, a fine of $12.5 million and/or an order make full restitution. Sentencing was expected to take place on November 3, 2016, but was rescheduled for after the Wayde McKelvy trial.

A change of plea hearing occurred on March 2, 2017 when Troy Wragg pleaded guilty to 10 counts of conspiracy, wire fraud and securities fraud. The maximum penalty is 240 years in prison, 5 years supervised release, a $12.5 million fine, and a $1000 special assessment. Sentencing was rescheduled for after the Wayde McKelvy trial.

== Sentencing ==
Troy Benjamin Wragg: Troy Wragg, 37, of Philadelphia, PA was sentenced on August 20, 2019 to 22 years in prison and $54 million restitution by United States District Judge Joel H. Slomsky for perpetrating two fraud schemes. Per the Federal Bureau of Prisons inmate locator website, Wragg is inmate #67165-019. As of 26 November 2022, he is 41 years old and incarcerated at FCI Ashland (Kentucky) with a projected release date of 8 September 2036 when he will be 59 years old.

Amanda Knorr: Amanda Knorr, 35, of Hellertown, Pa., received a prison sentence of 2.5 years on April 5, 2019 after pleading guilty to wire and securities fraud. The prosecutors called Mantria the biggest scam involving clean energy in American history. Per the Federal Bureau of Prisons inmate locator webpage, she was age 39 on 26 November 2022 and her Bureau of Prisons inmate number is #72393-066. She was released from prison on 9 July 2021.

Wayde McKelvy: Wayde McKelvy, 59, of Aurora, CO, was sentenced in August 2021 to 18 years in prison, five years of supervised release, and ordered to pay $37 million restitution after being convicted on October 18, 2018 on one count of conspiracy to commit fire fraud, seven counts of wire fraud, one count of conspiracy to engage in securities fraud and one count of securities fraud. Acting U.S. Attorney Jennifer Williams said in a statement. “McKelvy is nothing more than a twenty-first century snake oil salesman". Per the Federal Bureau of Prisons inmate locator website, McKelvy is inmate #41416-013. As of 26 November 2022, he is 60 years old and incarcerated at FCI Sandstone with a projected release date of 17 August 2036 when he will be 78 years old.
