= Anubhav Plantations =

Indian plantation cimpany

Anubhav Group
- Company type: Publicly owned
- Industry: Teak plantations, timeshare, agrotechnology
- Genre: Teak plantation deposit-mobilising company
- Founded: 1992
- Founder: C. Natesan
- Defunct: December 1998
- Fate: Allegations that the consortium of companies is a fraudulent Ponzi scheme
- Headquarters: Chennai, Tamil Nadu, India
- Area served: India
- Key people: C. Natesan, Chairman and MD; S. Shreenivas Rao, Director
- Services: Teak shares, time share units
- Number of employees: 1,800+
- Divisions: Anubhav Agrotech; Anubhav Green Farms & Resorts; Anubhav Plantations; Anubhav Royal Orchards Exports

Anubhav Plantations was an Indian Chennai-based plantation company founded in 1992. It sold shares in teak plantations on guaranteed interests and later diversified to other schemes through four principal companies: Anubhav Agrotech, Anubhav Green Farms & Resorts, Anubhav Plantations, and Anubhav Royal Orchards Exports.

The company suddenly closed down in 1998 when it could no longer pay its depositors, leaving its thousands of investors in the lurch and unpaid. Its chairman, C. Natesan, went underground and the other directors claimed ignorance and innocence. The incident became a major financial scandal in India. The company was subsequently revealed to have been a scam based on fraud, as teak, being an agriculture-based commodity, could not promise sure returns. Anubhav was found to have defrauded its depositors of nearly ₹400 crore (equivalent to ₹18 billion, US$190 million or €160 million in 2023) through Ponzi schemes. The Anubhav case is often termed by the Indian media as "The Great Plantation Scam of the 1990s".

== History ==
The Anubhav group of companies was founded by C. Natesan, a commerce graduate from Chennai's Vivekananda College and a chartered accountancy course dropout. Natesan started his career in 1983 by launching a consultancy firm called Yours Faithfully Consultancy. In 1984, he started a construction company with three partners. Three years later, in 1987, he closed this venture and set up the Anubhav Foundation, which became the mother company of his future enterprises.

== Formation ==
In 1991, as part of its post-liberalization process, the Indian government allowed firms within India to be formed as financial entities. Investment in agricultural commodities, which previously had only been permitted to the National Bank for Agriculture and Rural Development (NABARD), was opened up to the private sector. In this environment, Anubhav Plantations Ltd. (Anubhav) was floated by Natesan as a listed public limited company in 1992. Over the next six years, the Anubhav umbrella expanded to include various other companies including Anubhav Homes Ltd., Anubhav Resorts Ltd., Anubhav Finance & Investments, Anubhav Communications & Advertising (Pvt.) Ltd., Anubhav Royal Orchards & Exports, Anubhav Hire Purchase Ltd., Anubhav Green Farms & Resorts (Pvt.) Ltd., Anubhav Agro, Anubhav Security Bureau, Anubhav Interiors and Anubhav Health Club. Under these companies, the Anubhav group owned and operated 254 finance firms, including 95 firms of Anubhav finance investments, 169 firms of Anubhav dhan varsha and one firm each of Anubhav Agro and housing developers. Furthermore, the plantation companies themselves had several companies under them. For example, Anubhav plantation had six companies operating under it, including Anubhav Good Earth Unit II, Anubhav Teak Deposit and Anubhav India Limited.

By 1998, Anubhav group was worth ₹250 crore (US$26 million), and, apart from its teak-plantation schemes, was involved in other enterprises including finance, real estate and timeshare – a popular enterprise in the recently liberalized Indian economy of the 1990s. These companies were well-structured and backed by a nationwide infrastructure of 91 offices and over 1,800 employees. This included a young, aggressive and highly effective sales force.

== Modus operandi ==
Anubhav investors were offered teak certificates or teak shares for investing anything upwards of ₹1,000 (US$10). These investments were marketed under different confusing and complicated schemes that started to give returns each year of ₹1000 and bumper returns after 20 years to the tune of ₹50,000 (US$520). While NABARD stated that only ₹20–30 was actually required to plant a teak tree, plantation firms such as Anubhav justified their charging nearly ten times this amount by including costs for security de-weeding and fertilisers. Further, Anubhav inflated the expected yield of timber by nearly twenty times the standard that had been generally observed by previous NABARD studies. In return, a teak plant would be planted on their behalf, which could be sold 20 years later. During these 20 years, the certificate would yield around 20% interest for the depositor, yielding returns of around ₹50,000 after 20 years. This was nearly triple the return offered by bank deposits. The company claimed that it owned teak plantations spread over 1,000 acres (400 hectares) of land, and floated attractive advertisements and plush offices, thus encouraging confidence among investors.

Anubhav was not the first group to do this. During the early 1990s, teak plantations mushroomed in southern India, with 40 such companies registered in Madras and eight in Bangalore from January to September 1992. Most of these companies did not have adequate crop insurance and none of them were able to live up to their promises. All of them had skewed capital structures. The first attempt to promote private investment in teak plantations occurred in 1991, when a Hyderabad-based company, Sanghi Plantations, introduced a scheme offering investors teak trees at a nominal cost of ₹1,261 with what later turned out to be an unrealistic return of ₹50,000 after 20 years. Teak plantations typically take 50–60 years before yielding returns and are extremely susceptible to weather and the subtleties of the agricultural industry. They have rarely given dependable returns in India. However, in the light of general ignorance on the part of most laypeople, Anubhav entered this foray of marketing lucrative teak plantation schemes along with companies such as the Parasrampuria group, DSJ group and the Cochin-based "Sterling Tree Magnum", all of whom promised similarly large yet unrealistic returns. After the 1998 scam and subsequent investigations, CRISIL subsequently reported that on average, these teak plantation companies collectively had a promoter's contribution of just ₹35 lakh (US$37,000) for every investor's share of ₹300 crore.

Meanwhile, in interviews and announcements in news papers, Natesan unveiled future plans to forward-integrate from teak into furniture and to import machinery to make it. This led to a further increase in small investors. However, his growth strategy was focused mainly on mobilizing funds from investors rather than actually investing in plantations, plants, land and factories. The group had already raised vast sums of money to the tune of more than 400 crore rupees from the public in the form of fixed deposits, so-called "teak units", and a combination of fixed deposits and teak units. Natesan was extremely secretive about the financial performance of his group and this was never revealed to investors, who were happy as long as they received regular interest payments. Subsequent examinations of the company's accounts revealed that it was posting far higher incomes than its real profits. For example, in 1996–97, the company posted a net profit of ₹38.69 lakh (₹3,869,000) while its plantation income amounted to ₹35.32 crore (₹353,200,000). A total of nearly 3,500 teak plantation-based companies were set up in the 1990s in India, all promising interests to the tune of 21–24% when bank deposits gave an interest of just 5–7%.

During its height in the mid-1990s, the Anubhav group was often described by the media as an example of a successful company (thus becoming a role model for about 530 other teak- and agro-based companies listed by SEBI that arose during that time and also subsequently defaulted, including Ballarshah teak plantations). The media also portrayed a larger-than-life image of Natesan himself. An ambitious man, Natesan's ostentatious lifestyle, his cars, and his plush office in Chennai's up-market Royapettah area were frequently cited by the media as examples of his lavish tastes. Natesan had also associated his company with the World Wildlife Fund (WWF), thus garnering a positive image for his company.

== Scam of 1998 ==
In January 1998, cheques issued by Anubhav to its investors began to bounce. Some investors reported that other than the first two payments, all the cheques had bounced. Most of these investors were middle class and retired Indian working-class people who had invested their savings in Anubhav. Their amounts varied between ₹15,000 and ₹50,000 per person. They included Indians from large commercial centers such as Mumbai as well as smaller cities and towns such as Pune, Shimla, Trichy and Sangli. On 2 December 1998, a letter was sent to all the investors of Anubhav group to come to the Woodlands hotel in Chennai to receive their long-due payments. When some of the investors landed at Anubhav's offices in Royapettah, they were met with locked doors. The company had closed down, with Natesan absconding.

Some of these small investors were themselves on the brink of bankruptcy, having invested their life savings in the Anubhav group and its schemes. The letter that they had received had actually been sent by an advocate from a law firm that was following up the Anubhav group in response to court cases that had been filed against it. The letter invited them to come and check all the records and the balance sheet of the company. The event was covered by newspapers who reported that "...investors could be seen everywhere - sitting on the pavements, standing around the building, walking up and down the roads - all of them tense and worried."

Many depositors who went to the group's offices in Chennai and other cities to collect their deposit amount after maturity found the doors locked, and so lodged complaints with the police. Later, thousands of investors demonstrated in front of the company's headquarters in Chennai; however, by then, the main accused, Natesan, had already gone underground.

== Aftermath ==
Anubhav was eventually found to have duped investors and depositors of over ₹400 crore. As details about what became known as the "Great Plantation Scam of the 1990s" began to be unveiled in the media, and it turned out to be a Ponzi scheme, Natesan's modus operandi shocked those who had held the Anubhav group in high regard.

A government enquiry was subsequently launched into the Anubhav group. Its investigations revealed that the company had defrauded its investors through various plantation schemes, paying initial interests to old investors by simply channeling them from new investments by new investors. A liquidator, M. Ravindran, was appointed by the Madras High Court to try and repay its depositors at least in part. A number of investors formed their own city-based support and action groups to send in their claims, once such group being "The Pune Anubhav Investors' Action Committee (PAIAC)", formed by the 750-odd depositors of Pune who had collectively deposited ₹6 crore.

Natesan, the chairman and managing director of the Anubhav Group of Companies, was subsequently caught by the police and placed in judicial custody, while the filing of the final chargesheet in his criminal case (No. 20501 of 1999) was delayed. The Madras High Court meanwhile issued a non-bailable warrant against S. Shreenivas Rao, one of the directors of the Anubhav Group of Companies. Rao had earlier moved court, requesting that the non-bailable warrant issued by additional chief metropolitan magistrate in Chennai be recalled, as he was director of Anubhav Agrotech and had nothing to do with Anubhav Plantations Ltd. In its proceedings, the High Court observed that Anubhav Agrotech Ltd. was one among the Anubhav Group, which, in January 1999, became Anubhav Agro Developers. The court observed that there was proof that Anubhav Plantation funds were diverted.

The Anubhav teak plantation scam (often simply referred to as "The Teak Plantations Scam of the 1990s") is often included in the list of scams that occurred in post-liberalized India in the 1990s and has been called "The Great Plantation Scam of the 1990s". However, plantation-related frauds continue to occur in the country, with unsuspecting people lured by promises of high interests. A more recent case, that of Timber World Resorts and Plantations Ltd., which had been launched by a catering college graduate Ashwani Sud from Delhi, turned out to be a similar scam in 2009. Similarly, in 2012, hundreds of Gujaratis lost their money in a similar tree-plantation scam floated by the Ellisbridge (Ahmedabad)-based company "Golden Trees Plantation Ltd."

While the first to be unearthed, the Anubhav scam was not the largest agro-based scam in India. As per the SEBI, in the subsequent Pearls Agrotech scam, Pearls Agrotech Corporation Limited (PACL) collected ₹49,100 crore (US$5.1 billion) from 5.85 crore (58,500,000) customers over 15 years by offering ambiguous investments linked to agricultural land and its development over a certain period of time.

After seven years of judicial custody, Natesan was released on bail in 2007. Of the ₹1,071,233,696 (US$11 million) invested by small investors, the company ultimately refunded ₹1,004,464,461 (US$10 million) to 31,431 depositors. About ₹7 crore (US$730,227) has still not been refunded to 2,044 depositors.
