= Bennett Funding Group =

American leasing and funding company

The Bennett Funding Group was a leasing & funding company based in Syracuse, New York. BFG operated under the Bennett Receivables Corporation, Bennett Receivables Corporation II, Bennett Management and Development Corporation, +++The Processing Center, Inc., Resort Service Company, Inc., American Marine International, Ltd., Aloha Leasing, and Aloha Capital Corporation brands.

From the SEC website:

On March 28, 1996, the SEC filed a civil action against The Bennett Funding Group, Inc., its chief financial officer, Patrick R. Bennett, and other companies Bennett controlled, in connection with an alleged fraudulent scheme. The SEC alleged that the defendants fraudulently raised more than several hundred million dollars, purportedly to purchase assignments of equipment leases and promissory notes.

On March 29, 1996, the four corporate defendants filed for protection under Chapter 11 of the Bankruptcy Code. On April 18, 1996, the Bankruptcy Court of the Northern District of New York appointed Richard C. Breeden as Trustee.

== Background ==
Bennett Funding Group was a finance company that leased office equipment, such as photocopiers and fax machines, and then sold securities to investors backed by the leases. The company was founded and wholly owned by Edmund ("Bud") and Kathleen Bennett. The company was run by their sons, Michael, the CEO, and Patrick, the CFO.

The SEC filed civil charges against the company in March 1996. On December 13, 2004, the SEC civil action against Patrick R. Bennett was closed based on a final consent agreement between Patrick R. Bennett and the SEC, without Patrick R. Bennett admitting any wrongdoing and without any financial judgment against Patrick R. Bennett.

Funds from the company were invested in such things as the Vernon Downs racetrack, gambling boats called the Speculator and the Gold Shore Casino, the Hotel Syracuse, a 70' yacht named Lady Kathleen, and Harold's Club casino in Reno, Nevada. Bennett Funding then filed Chapter 11 bankruptcy. The bankruptcy ended in 2009, with recoveries of over $752 million. At the time of the bankruptcy filing, total reported assets of The Bennett Funding Group, Inc. ("Bennett Funding Group"), exceeded total liabilities.

On February 25, 2008, the bankruptcy court judge entered an Order approving a Global Settlement Agreement between the Bennett Funding Group Chapter 7 Trustee and Patrick R. Bennett, and other parties, dismissing all claims against Patrick R. Bennett and counterclaims filed by Patrick R. Bennett against the Chapter 7 Trustee, without Patrick R. Bennett admitting any wrongdoing and without any financial judgment against Patrick R. Bennett

Eleven people involved in the alleged fraud faced criminal charges. Nine pled guilty, including Michael Bennett, one was found innocent, and one, Patrick Bennett, was convicted. Patrick R Bennett's first criminal trial ended in jury deadlock on all fraud and money laundering allegations. Patrick R. Bennett's second trial concluded on June 10, 1999, again with jury deadlock on all charges relating to the alleged ponzi scheme, but the fraud and money laundering convictions relating to Bennett Funding Group's audited financial statements. A criminal forfeiture order was also entered against Patrick R. Bennett in favor of the government based on the financial transactions underlying the money laundering allegations, funds never received personally by Patrick R. Bennett At the conclusion of the second trial, the alleged 'ponzi' scheme counts were dismissed on motion by the government.

In April 2000, Patrick R. Bennett was sentenced to 30 years in federal prison (later reduced to 22 years) under the mandatory federal sentencing guidelines. Edmund and Kathleen Bennett were not charged.

On January 12, 2015 the criminal forfeiture liability against Patrick R. Bennett was discharged in a federal bankruptcy case.
