= Swisscash =

Offshore investment company

The Swiss Mutual Fund, also known as Swiss Cash or Swisscash, is an offshore investment company headquartered in the Commonwealth of Dominica. It involved in operating an Internet-based investment scheme which offers returns of up to 300% within 15 months of investment and has been identified as one of the Ponzi schemes taking place in 2000s.

Despite the inclusion of the word Swiss in its name, the Swiss Mutual Fund's board of directors is composed solely of Dominican citizens, and the company does not appear to have any significant ties to Switzerland.

== History ==
Swiss Mutual Fund originally claimed on its website that it was created after World War II in 1948 by the Cheviot family of France, with operations based in Bern, Switzerland. In 1996, the firm moved to the Commonwealth of Dominica due to changes in financial regulations in Europe. However the Swiss Embassy in Kuala Lumpur has stated the following:

"The Swiss Mutual Fund (1948) and or Swiss Cash are not registered companies in Switzerland. Until proof of the contrary, the Embassy doubts that the remarks about these funds and their historic links to Switzerland as outlined on their original website are genuine. The original website is indeed registered in the USA and the contact telephone number is from New Jersey (USA)."

This information was also corroborated by the Swiss Embassy in Singapore.

On 13 December 2006, Swiss Mutual Fund (1948) S.A. was struck off the Commonwealth of Dominica's Register of International Business Companies.

On 21 June 2007, the Securities Commission Malaysia obtained a worldwide Mareva injunction against the Swiss Cash operators to prevent them from disposing their assets in and outside of Malaysia.

On 17 September 2007, the Financial Supervision Commission of the Commonwealth of Dominica issued a press release, which confirms that Swisscash is not a registered or incorporated company and does not have any established business in the island nation.

On 25 September 2008, the Securities Commission Malaysia obtained a High Court judgement against three defendants involved in the Swiss Cash investment scam. The court restrained them from carrying on the Swisscash business and ordered them to pay US$83 million and any further amounts to be traced for the purpose of compensating the investors of the scam.

On 6 November 2009, the Securities Commission Malaysia entered into consent judgement with those involved to pay a sum of approximately RM 31 million to eligible investors who have suffered losses as a result of the Swiss Cash scam.

On 21 December 2011, in its final status report to the Kuala Lumpur High Court, the Securities Commission Malaysia revealed that it had completed the distribution of the Swisscash settlement sum of RM 30.5 million to 19,625 eligible investors. Prior to the final settlement, a total of 29,885 claims amounting to RM 188 million were received from Malaysian and foreign investors of the Swiss Mutual Fund.

== Criticism ==
There have been allegations that the Swiss Mutual Fund is a Pyramid scheme, with victims predominantly in Malaysia. The Central Bank of Malaysia has issued warnings regarding Swiss Mutual Fund's legitimacy, and have advised investors to avoid the company and its subsidiaries. The Monetary Authority of Singapore has placed Swiss Mutual Fund in their Investor Alert List.
