= Business Consulting International =

Pyramid and Ponzi scheme

Business Consulting International was a London-based investment company that collapsed after being exposed by a City of London Police investigation in 2008 as the United Kingdom's biggest ponzi scheme, estimated at £115M. The business was set up and run by Kautilya Nandan Pruthi, a London-based Indian businessman, in partnership with Kenneth Peacock and John Anderson, who both lived in Sunningdale, Surrey.

Based from rented offices at 1 Relton Mews, Knightsbridge, the proposal of BCI was that clients lent it money, so that BCI in turn could lend that money at very high rates of interest to "distressed" businesses that found themselves unable to borrow from banks for short periods of time. Pruthi through BCI offered investors a return of between 4% and 20% a month on short-term fixed deposits of between four weeks and a year, while Anderson and Peacock through their own consulting companies promised slightly lower rates, passing on their deposits directly to Pruthi.

In the last three years of operation (2005–November 2008), the partners each attracted:

- Anderson: 130 clients, investing in total between £8.4M and £10.1M
- Peacock: 175 clients, investing in total between £9M and £10M
- Pruthi: 290 clients, investing in total £49.5M

Peacock, a member of Surrey County Cricket Club, lured in many sports personalities to the scheme. The three partners would also meet regularly at Lord's and The Oval, where they would also meet potential investors. Pruthi additionally bought Apex Motorsports, in which he invested the funds, and to which he invited investment clients to participate in various UK and global motorsports events.

== Investigation ==
In November 2008, BCI and the partners' assets were frozen to allow an investigation to be undertaken by the City of London Police. Lodging papers at the High Court, the Financial Services Authority accused BCI and its partners of illegally accepting deposits for a collective investment scheme in contravention of the Financial Services and Markets Act 2000, as they were not authorised to operate such an enterprise.

Despite working in the same offices, Pruthi immediately claimed that Anderson and Peacock operated independently of him and so there was no such organised "scheme". The three also counter-argued that the monies were never pooled to be "collectively" invested, and so they could not have breached the Act.

The FSA started a search for the invested monies, which globally extended to Dubai, the Cayman Islands, Thailand and Bermuda. In the UK they seized: £1 million in jewellery; £250,000 in cash; and 16 cars, including Bentleys, two Ferraris, and a Lamborghini. Pruthi was the sole shareholder of Relton Mews Air Ltd, a Bermuda-based company that owned a twin-engine Cessna Citation I jet aircraft, registered as VP-BGE. This aircraft crashed near Biggin Hill Airport, Kent, on 30 March 2008, killing five people, including: David Leslie, a touring car driver; Richard Lloyd, a racing driver and APEX team co-owner; and Chris Allarton, a data engineer. They were travelling to the Nogaro Circuit in France to test for Apex Motorsport in preparation for the FIA GT3 European Championship. Any monies from a $1 million (£610,000) insurance claim for the aircraft will now be deposited with the FSA.

== Trial ==
On 25 March 2010, the High Court ruled that Pruthi, Anderson and Peacock, trading as Business Consulting International, John Anderson Consulting and Kenneth Peacock Consulting, were unlawfully accepting deposits from UK consumers.

On 29 June 2010, the High Court declared that the three must pay the FSA £115M within a defined period, split: Pruthi £89.8M; Anderson £13.2M; Peacock £11.6M. But on failing to do so, the High Court declared each of them bankrupt, to allow the FSA to recover the maximum amount of client funds.

On 30 July 2010, Pruthi was charged with 30 fraud offences including running a bogus business, money laundering and obtaining money by deception, later released on bail. The main trial was scheduled for early 2012 at Southwark Crown Court, in front of Judge Michael Gledhill QC, to allow time for the FSA to recover funds.

On 30 January 2012, before the trial began, Pruthi pleaded guilty in a pre-trial hearing to: four specimen counts of obtaining money transfers by deception; one count of participating in a fraudulent business; one count of unauthorised regulated activity; and one count of converting and removing criminal property. On 5 March, Anderson and Peacock were convicted of unauthorised regulated activity, in a scheme masterminded by Pruthi. On 7 March, Anderson and Peacock were found not guilty of recklessly making a misleading, false or deceptive promise. Jurors also cleared them of one count each of fraud.
