= Metaverse Foreign Exchange =

Metaverse Foreign Exchange (MTFE) a Ponzi scheme that collected funds, claiming to be a trading platform that uses AI bots to automate cryptocurrency trade defrauded over a billion USD, mainly from investors in Africa and South Asia. The scheme used a system that rewarded users for recruiting more under them and the Central Bank of Sri Lanka had warned it to be a pyramid scheme. In reality, MTFE did not actually carry out trades, and the bot simply fabricated profits and losses to give the appearance of a legitimate platform. When the scheme finally collapsed, all accounts were programmed to show fake negative balances. In 2026, the Central Bank of Sri Lanka officially declared it a prohibited pyramid scheme.

== History ==
The MTFE Group began aggressively recruting around 2022, promising unrealistically high returns. It claimed to be registered in Canada as a money service business with MSB No. M22076570, and also regulated by FINTRAC. However, Canada’s Ontario Securities Commission issued a warning in 30 June 2023 stating that the company was not authorised to engage in the trading of securities.

== Operations ==
MTFE run as a network of dozens of shell companies and many had listed foreign directors. The Investigative Journalism Foundation interviewed experts who claimed these directors are likely fake identities. Only one Canadian director was mentioned, named "Randy Mathieu Lane". Later investigation by CTV News discovered that MTFE had stolen the identity of an uninvolved Canadian man to set up the companies.

MTFE’s corporate address was 500-7030 Woodbine Avenue in Markham, Ontario but the same office room was shared with 97 other money services companies and 95 registered foreign currency exchanges but the Investigative Journalism Foundation couldn't find any evidence if these businesses were physically present in the address.
