= Success University =

American multi-level marketing company

Success Learning Systems Inc.
- Type: Privately held
- Founded: January 2005
- Founder: Matt Morris
- Headquarters: Dallas, Texas
- Services: Multi-level marketing / Pyramid scheme

Success University, founded in January 2005 by Matt Morris, is a privately held company based in Dallas, Texas. It has also been identified as a pyramid scheme. Success University does not employ any professors and does not have any premises; instead members are offered online courses on topics such as success in business, or physical wellbeing. Members have to pay an introduction fee, and are then encouraged to invite other people to join in exchange for a part of the benefits.

According to a study by the Bank of Namibia, Success University presents the features of a pyramid scheme, and they have estimated that about 88% percent of participants eventually make losses, with only a minority—at the top of the pyramid—making benefits. Namibia declared Success University illegal in 2008.

Ketan Hirani and Kalpesh Patel introduced the scheme in London in January 2008. Prior to Success University, they have also been involved with several other pyramid schemes run by Robert Fitzpatrick and Gurdeep Singh, including the Omi Club, VIP and MLI schemes. Hirani and Patel have been banned from the University College London campus, following a speech there about Success University.
