= Kubus scheme =

Ponzi or Pyramid scheme

The Kubus scheme was a scheme that originated in South Africa in the 1980s and was subsequently exported to the United States. It involved the cultivation of milk yeast cultures, which was sold to the originator, and the recultivating of the next batch. The producers had to canvas new members to the organisation to ensure sustainability. The whole scheme crashed when the government decided to implement a law in retrospect, thereby declaring the scheme illegal. The originator had to pay back all the money to claimants, likewise all who benefited had to return their earnings.

== Origins ==
The scheme was initiated by Adriaan Nieuwoudt after his grandmother showed him a milk culture she used as a skin product. He turned the culture into a remote work business by selling dried plants that would produce thick milk for R500, which would produce 10 jars of culture a week. In return he paid R10 per envelope or R100 per week for producers who sent him a teaspoon of the culture, making for break-even within five weeks. The dried product sent back by activation kit buyers were ground up, without first being removed from the envelopes in which it was shipped – and resold as new activators.

Thousands of people invested a reported R140-million in the scheme before it was declared an illegal lottery. In the end, after it was declared illegal through retrospective legislation, Mr. Nieuwoudt said that he could have repaid every cent to the participants but does not confirm that he actually did. However many people still claim that they have lost considerable amounts of money, some as much as their life savings and others their pension and claim to have never received any payback. Other copy-cat schemes who followed the same basic recipe, were in no way associated with Kubus.

== In the United States ==
According to subsequent evidence presented at trial, the Kubus business was exported to the United States in 1984. By late 1984 several corporations had been established around the product, among them: Activator Supply Company, Inc. sold "activator kits" that allowed the making of the milk culture for $350 per a minimum of ten kits; Culture Farms, Inc. produced, bought and sold culture; and Cleopatra's Secret, Inc., (also known as House of Cleopatra) was to utilise the culture in manufacturing cosmetics.
