= European Kings Club =

1991–1994 Ponzi scheme in Europe

The European Kings Club (EKC) was a large-scale Ponzi scheme operated from 1991 to 1994 primarily in Switzerland, Germany and Austria by the German nationals Damara and Harald Bertges and Hans Günther Spachtholz.

The EKC promised investors profit rates of 70% after buying "letters" for 1,400 Swiss francs each. In total, victims bought some two billion Deutsche Mark worth of EKC letters. Participation was particularly widespread in central Switzerland, where the scheme's operators successfully exploited popular mistrust in the banking system. In the cantons of Uri and Glarus, about one in ten citizens bought EKC letters. The EKC was also active in the United States.

The scheme collapsed in the autumn of 1994 when authorities in Germany and Switzerland arrested the EKC leadership and managed to seize about 500 million marks of the money paid by the EKC's victims. The collapse of the EKC led to public unrest in the heavily affected parts of Switzerland, where many participants, refusing to believe that they had fallen prey to a Ponzi scheme, organized public demonstrations in support of the EKC leadership, and prosecutors received death threats. In the USA, the SEC obtained a restraining order in 1993, and the EKC agreed in 1994 to pay a large fine and to repay investors.

Damara Bertges, the EKC's leader, was convicted in 1997 by a German court to 8 years imprisonment for fraud and participation in a criminal organization, and was set free on probation after serving five years. Her husband Harald and their accomplice Spachtholz, as well as another associate, were each convicted to four and a half years of imprisonment.
