= Norman Adie =

American businessman

- Born: Norman Allen Adie; November 25, 1946 (age 79); Scotland, United Kingdom
- Citizenship: United States
- Occupations: Theater owner and developer
- Employer(s): Rank Organisation; 20th Century Fox; Radio City Music Hall
- Organization: Screen Arts Corporation
- Known for: Operating the Brooklyn Heights Cinema and developing Monroe 6 Cinemas.

Norman Allen Adie (born November 25, 1946) is a former theater owner/operator/developer and confessed Ponzi schemer, presently inmate number 64354–054 in the Federal Detention Center (FDC) in Miami, Florida. Born in Scotland, Adie began his career in London with the Rank Organization and Twentieth Century Fox before moving to the United States to work at Radio City Music Hall.

== Career ==
Adie founded Screen Arts Corporation and developed his own New York theaters in Times Square and Park Slope, Brooklyn. Adie's decade-long efforts to open a theater in Monroe, New York were delayed by protracted, well-publicized lawsuits and counter-lawsuits resulting from a troubled partnership with One Liberty Properties. "Monroe 6 Cinemas" eventually opened in 2008 but went into receivership three years later after Adie failed to pay the mortgage and property taxes. Adie operated the Brooklyn Heights Cinema in Brooklyn, New York, for ten years before selling it to Kenn Lowy in 2011 after misappropriating the theater's finances. Adie opened the Foxmoor 7 Cinemas in Marshalls Creek, Pennsylvania in 2006 only to be evicted in 2009 for failing to pay rent. Adie's plans to open a movie multiplex in Matamoras, Pennsylvania in 2008 never came to fruition and resulted in a $12.7 million judgment against Adie in 2009.

== Arrest ==
On November 23, 2010, Adie was arrested and charged with Federal securities and wire fraud. He confessed to the charges and was sentenced in May, 2012 to 20 months in Federal prison.
