= Arthur Nadel =

American hedge fund manager (1933–2012)

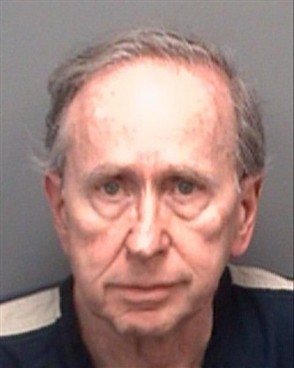
Booking photo of Arthur Nadel in 2009

Arthur Geoffrey Nadel (January 1, 1933 – April 16, 2012) was an American hedge fund manager, disbarred lawyer, piano player, and philanthropist. In 2009, Nadel was indicted on fifteen federal counts of securities fraud, wire fraud, and mail fraud. If found guilty, he could have been sentenced to 280 years in prison and would have been required to forfeit all assets connected to the fraud.

Nadel was a Sarasota, Florida-based manager of the hedge fund Scoop Management Co., which has reportedly lost $350 million. He was arrested on January 27, 2009 after surrendering at the Tampa Federal Bureau of Investigation (FBI) office. Nadel, who had been reported missing by his fifth wife since January 14, was accompanied by two attorneys, Todd Foster and Barry Cohen.

His wife, Marguerite "Peg" J. (Quisenberry) Nadel had contacted authorities after he left a note telling her how to survive financially without him. "The avenues to money for you will likely be blocked soon," Nadel wrote to his wife in a note that employees found January 15 in a shredding machine. "Withdraw as much cash as you can," he said, adding that he would send further instructions. "Sell the Subaru if you need money." He left a package for his wife. "Look at all the recently paid bills in the 'package' to see where they stand," he wrote. "Also in the package are enough documents that I think will do the trick to give you complete control and ownership of what is left, and even documentation for divorce."

She said he was distraught over the losses, according to Bloomberg News. According to the Sarasota County Sheriff's Office, Nadel felt guilty and threatened to kill himself. As of January 20, 2009, federal law enforcement authorities had tracked Nadel to Slidell, Louisiana. On April 18, 2012, Nadel died at Butner Federal Correctional Complex in North Carolina. He was 79.

== Personal life and previous occupations ==
Nadel worked his way through New York University, and in 1957, graduated from New York University Law School, playing piano in Manhattan. He never actively practiced law, but was disbarred in 1982, citing "dishonesty, fraud, deceit and misrepresentation".

He moved to Sarasota in around 1978, and he allegedly took $50,000 from an escrow account to help a friend and real estate company president who was deeply in debt. Different versions of who received the money have been reported. He had already repaid the money with interest by 1981. He had already been married and divorced twice and had several children. He was a CEO in the 1970s of a public company that built health care facilities. In 1978, he and others tried to convert the rundown, historic Mira Mar Hotel into condominiums. The plan fell apart. He subsequently played in piano bars, befriending local artists and musicians.

In 1987, he married his third wife, Virginia "Jennifer" Hoffman, an artist 22 years his junior. Her friends began complaining that he had sold their works but never paid them. They divorced in 1991. He attempted to expand an interior decorating business—the Sarasota Design Gallery, which sold unusual furnishings and original art—by attracting investors, claiming in a "confidential" prospectus that the gallery was profitable, although court records showed several judgments against him for unpaid bills. He claimed destitution.

He became a real estate developer and securities investor in Sarasota during the 1960s, according to marketing documents for the Valhalla fund.

From 1994 through 1997, Nadel was employed as a piano player at Homestyle Harmony restaurant, a family-style dining establishment in Sarasota where waitstaff sang "sing-a-long" songs to customers during dinner, as well as performing for guests in a "parlor" show down the hall in the restaurant. The restaurant closed in 1997.

In 1997, he and Peg started a day-trading club and developed a computer-based investment and trading system. They teamed up with Neil V. Moody, a Sarasota entrepreneur, and began managing money for clients in Moody's Valhalla, Victor, and Viking funds. The companies attracted scores of investors, promising high returns. In 2005, the Nadels bought 430 acres (1.7 km^{2}) near Asheville, North Carolina, intending to sell lots for up to $525,000 in a proposed development called Laurel Mountain Preserve. The project turned when prices collapsed. Four lots were donated to their foundation as tax write off.

The Sarasota Herald-Tribune reported "The Nadels were known for their civic activities, serving on boards and donating money to charity: Habitat for Humanity, Jewish Family & Children's Services, and Girls Inc. which received $100,000. All received cash gifts and pledges from the couple in recent years. None had any money invested in the hedge funds." Their Guy-Nadel Foundation made more than $1-million in donations, including $200,000 to Catholic churches, $100,000 to the Sarasota Opera and $75,000 to a local theater group.

== SEC charges and criminal charges ==
Tampa U.S. Magistrate Judge Mark Pizzo denied Nadel's request to be released on his own recognizance, and on January 30, 2009 ordered him held without bail at the Pinellas County jail. On February 2, 2009, Judge Pizzo issued a warrant of removal, removing the case from the jurisdiction of the Middle District of Florida to the Southern District of New York.

The SEC says Nadel had transferred at least $1.25 million from two of the hedge funds to secret bank accounts that he controlled.

=== 16-Count indictment ===
On April 15, 2009, U.S. Magistrate Judge Kevin N. Fox in Manhattan appointed Mark Gombiner, an attorney from the Federal Defenders of New York, Inc., to represent Nadel.

On April 28, 2009, in the Southern District of New York, federal regulators handed down a 15-count indictment against Nadel, which carries maximum prison sentences of 280 years.

"Nadel solicited prospective clients to invest in the funds by making various misrepresentations about the performance and value of the funds, including that the net asset value of each of the funds was tens of millions of dollars. the U.S. Attorney's Office in New York said in a statement. Nadel also claimed to investors that his purchases and sales of securities in the Funds had generated cumulatively more than $271 million in gains. In truth, Nadel's trading resulted in an overall net loss in the funds," the U.S. Attorney's Office in New York said in a statement.

On February 25, U.S. District Judge Denise Cote had ruled he could be released after posting a $5 million bond, including $1 million in cash, and four people to whom he has a "close relationship" to guarantee his bond and be subject to electronic monitoring. She required Nadel to cooperate with the receiver of his funds and to identify the location of $30 million he allegedly withdrew since October, 2008.

The criminal case is U.S.A. v. Nadel, 09-mJ-00169, U.S. District Court, Southern District of New York (Manhattan).

=== Bankruptcy trustee ===
The Securities and Exchange Commission (SEC) won a court order on January 21, 2009 freezing Nadel's assets. On February 11, 2009, the receiver, Burton Wiand moved to freeze the $650,000 Marguerite J. Nadel Revocable Trust, and Nadel's property in Asheville, North Carolina. Six hedge funds and two investment management companies are named as relief defendants. They are: Scoop Real Estate L.P., Valhalla Investment Partners L.P., Victory IRA Fund Ltd., Victory Fund Ltd., Viking IRA Fund LLC, Viking Fund LLC, Valhalla Management Inc. and Viking Management Inc. in the case. The SEC case is Securities and Exchange Commission v. Nadel, 09-cv-00087, U.S. District Court, Middle District of Florida (Tampa).

At the end of 2007, all six funds contained $18 million. Wiand identified $397 million taken in from investors. Approximately $350 million was paid in distributions to investors and fees. He has recovered $120,000 in investor funds improperly transferred to two individuals, and received nearly $261,000 in business income from ongoing operations through Feb. 28, 2009. Wiand estimated the fraud began possibly earlier than 2003, and intends to recover additional funds from the Moodys' fees collected from Scoop.

==== Clawbacks ====
Wiand has identified more than 80 investors who made "false profits" in Nadel's hedge fund and as a clawback has asked them to return the money. Any unreturned funds will be pursued in court.

Robert O. Chambers Trust, received $301,614 in false profits. Blake L. Chambers, trustee of the trust, agreed within 14 days to pay $271,453, or 90 percent of the total.

Gary Musser 70, of Las Vegas agreed to pay $192,571.43, which includes a 10 percent discount offered for settling out of court. He has already paid income taxes on the money, yet the Internal Revenue Service only allowed him to go back three years in amending his returns to get a refund.

=== Others involved ===
The Moodys have already given statements to the U.S. Attorney.

Neil and Chris Moody, father and son partners of Nadel's served as general partners on Viking, Viking IRA and Valhalla, which at one point accounted for half of the actual brokerage firm value, estimated to be $97 million in asset management fees of 2 percent per year, plus a much larger 25 percent incentive fee for running what was portrayed as highly profitable hedge funds. The funds held $72 million at their peak in 2004. By 2007, the actual value of those same three funds was $7 million.

Burton Wiand has confirmed he will take legal action against the Moodys to gain control of assets tied to Nadel's failed hedge funds. It was Neil Moody who informed his 600 investors that the money they invested in Scoop's hedge funds had disappeared. The Moodys have denied knowing anything about the Ponzi scheme, but many of Nadel's investors claim that they were their primary contact. According to Wiand, Nadel and the Moodys both represented that the hedge funds' trading activity generated more than $272 million in gains when" they actually lost $18.4 million. The three Viking funds the Moody's managed with Nadel had results ranging from a 4 percent annualized gain to a 24.5 percent per year loss. But the Moody's told their investors that returns for the funds were much higher.

A civil fraud case against them has been filed on behalf of Louis Paolino, Jr. who lost more than $5.8 million, and a lis pendens has been placed on the Sarasota waterfront residences owned by both men.

Nadel's accountant, Michael D. Zucker, had not been licensed as a Certified Public Accountant in the state of Florida since 1990.

David S Band Law firm "Band Weintraub PL" will pay nearly $1 million to settle claims that it was front and center in a conspiracy to hide money from the receiver in the Arthur Nadel Ponzi scheme.

== "The most consistent returns I have ever seen" ==
Nadel's funds purportedly returned 21.6% in 2002 and 19.8% in 2001, years when the S&P 500 returned -23.3% and -13.0% respectively. An article in The Wall Street Digest by Donald H. Rowe, Chairman of Carnegie Asset Management, cited the superior returns of Nadel's funds as "the best track record and most consistent returns I have ever seen." Rowe apparently ignored initial misgivings about the source of Nadel's returns, writing: "My curiosity about Nadel's computerized trading program eventually led to a due diligence visit to the offices of Nadel & Moody. Understandably, I did not learn the various mathematical formulas in Nadel's "black box" computer program."

Despite the statistical improbability of the stated returns, Rowe's article offers a glowing recommendation and includes contact information for the funds. Fine print disclosures in the article reveal that "Carnegie Asset Management is affiliated with The Wall Street Digest, Inc., as is The Wall Street Trader, Inc. Carnegie Asset Management, from time to time, makes referrals to MRM Asset Allocation Group, Inc., and/or The Nadel Moody Group, registered investment advisors not affiliated with each other nor with Carnegie Asset Management, for which Carnegie Asset Management receives monetary compensation."

Burton Wiand's April, 2009 interim receiver's report, submitted as part of the Securities and Exchange Commission's civil suit against Nadel, says Nadel paid out some $53 million in "fictitious profits" as part of his Ponzi scheme.

== Total value of hedge funds ==
Nadel traded for three funds established by partnerships Valhalla Management and Viking Management and three funds established by Scoop Management and Scoop Capital LLC. Scoop was created by Nadel himself. Viking and Valhalla were created by unnamed partners.

According to the SEC:

- Victory Fund: securities, $1,901.31, and cash, $78,764.37
- Scoop Real Estate: securities, $2,119.81, and cash, $122,830.40
- Viking IRA Fund: securities, $2,923.58, and cash, $77,025.20
- Viking Fund: securities, $917.70, and cash, $65,708.33
- Valhalla Investment Partners: securities, $4,413.66, and cash, $16,158.05
- Victory IRA Fund: securities, $2,938.86, and cash, $131,139.52

The total value of the hedge fund securities on January 14 — the date of Nadel's disappearance — was thus $15,214.92, and the cash on hand was $491,625.87.

== Investor losses ==
More than 371 investors invested $397 million. Investors' out-of-pocket losses are estimated at $168.7 million.

Neil V. Moody, 70 told the Associated Press that his immediate family has lost $12 million due to Nadel. Moody, one of Nadel's business partners, suggests the $350 million figure may be inflated due to Nadel's own overstating of his fund's success.

Dennis Raefield, president and chief executive of Mace Security International Inc., based in Horsham, Pennsylvania, claims that Nadel's Victory Fund failed to pay $2.2 million as promised, the day after Nadel vanished on January 15, 2009. Raefield said he asked Nadel in June 2008 to redeem Mace's entire $3.2 million investment in the short-term hedge fund, Victory. The money was to be paid by October 10, 2008, or 10 business days after the close of the third quarter. On October 15, fund managers asserted their right to withhold the payout "due to extraordinary market circumstances". After negotiations, the fund agreed to pay the money in two installments. Mace received only one payment of $1 million on November 5.

Louis Paolino, Jr., former executive officer of Mace Security lost more than $5.8 million of personal funds in the Viking Fund LLC. His lawsuit claims that the Moodys took fraudulently obtained money from investors in Scoop's funds and bought homes with part of the proceeds.

David Walters of Ocala, Florida lost most of his pension from Bethlehem Steel, more than $670,000.

Michael Sullivan, a neighbor of Nadel's, an 80-year-old attorney, invested $15 million.

Sullivan, an Illinois entrepreneur recommended by his neighbor, put $250,000 into Nadel's Scoop Management three years ago, and an additional $1.4 million shortly before Nadel vanished.

Dr. Brad Lerner, Sarasota, invested $500,000.

== Other business interests ==
On January 27, 2009, Venice Jet Center LLC and Tradewind LLC, two of Nadel's businesses, were ordered into receivership by Tampa U.S. District Judge Richard Lazzara. The judge appointed attorney Burton Wiand as receiver for Nadel's funds, said in a court filing that the businesses were bought with fraudulently obtained money. Venice Jet Center provides charter services and a flight school, and "is a viable business with potential to generate assets for the receivership". Tradewind owns and controls at least five aircraft and owns airport hangars at the Newnan-Coweta County Airport in suburban Atlanta, Georgia. The Venice Jet Center trained some of the 9/11 hijackers under different ownership. Tradewind Aviation was run by his son Chris, who has an airline pilot's license. Federal records show Tradewind owns two Cessna Citation jets, a Lear Jet, a helicopter, and several smaller aircraft.

Public records show Nadel was an officer of Summer Place Development Corp., a 6.5-acre (26,000 m^{2}) undeveloped parcel in Manatee County, Florida. He was listed as director, secretary, and treasurer.

== See also ==
- Bernard Madoff
- Nicholas Cosmo
- Joseph S. Forte
- Marcus Schrenker
- Raoul Weil
- Marc Dreier
