= Joseph S. Forte =

American con artist

Joseph S. Forte of Broomall, Pennsylvania, is an American con artist who operated a Ponzi scheme that cost investors $50 million. He reportedly signed a confession with the United States Postal Inspection Service.

== Biography ==
The Ponzi scheme operated from at least February 1995. Up to 80 investors are involved. Civil charges were filed in federal court in Philadelphia on January 7, 2009 by the Commodity Futures Trading Commission with the help of the Securities and Exchange Commission. Forte's assets were frozen by the court.

Forte allegedly confessed to spending $10–12 million on himself, while using $15–20 million to pay off other investors. The rest may have been lost in trading in futures contracts on the S&P 500 index, foreign currencies, or metals. According to the SEC, Forte reported to his investors that his fund's value was over $154 million, while the actual balance was $146,814.

In late December 2008, he turned himself in to authorities. While the timing is coincidental with the Ponzi scheme of Bernard Madoff, there is no apparent connection.

On June 5, 2009, Forte pleaded guilty to wire fraud, bank fraud, mail fraud, and money laundering for his role in his Ponzi scheme.

On November 24, 2009, Forte was sentenced to 15 years in prison.

== See also ==
- Bernard Madoff
- Arthur Nadel
- Nicholas Cosmo
- Allen Stanford
