= G.A. Miller =

Florida construction company

G.A. Miller Inc also known as GA Miller Construction Co. was a Tampa, Florida construction company. The company built twenty Kress stores including in St. Petersburg, Florida; Lakeland, Florida; Tampa; Ybor City; Fort Myers; Daytona Beach; as well as in North and South Carolina; Georgia; Alabama; Spokane, Washington; and Billings, Montana. The company also constructed the Edwards Theater (now the Sarasota Opera House), the original Sarasota Herald building (now the Sarasota Woman's Exchange), and the Mira Mar Hotel (demolished in 1982).

The company constructed M. Leo Elliott's First Bank and Trust Building (Sarasota) (1924) as well as its annex (1945). The building included steam heat "for every office", drinking fountains on each floor, and "the first passenger electric hydraulic elevator in Sarasota." It would have been the first skyscraper in Sarasota, but the Sarasota Hotel stole its crown. The building was later owned by Palmer Bank which merged with Southeast Bank in 1976 and then First Union in 1991. It was demolished by RISCORP to make way for a new building of condominiums, offices, retail and restaurants called Plaza at Five Points.

In Orlando the company built the Orange Court Apartment Hotel (1923). It was built for R.E. Grabel and J.N. Wigfall between Concord Avenue and Colonial Drive. The hotel features on historic postcards, and was pictured on a mural. the building was demolished in 1990.

== Construction projects ==
- Palmer First National Bank Building (1924)
- Polk Theatre (1927), designed by J.E. Casale.
- S.H. Kress Building (Charleston) (1931)
- S. H. Kress and Co. Building (Sarasota, Florida) (1932)
