= Victor DeRenzi =

American conductor (born 1949)

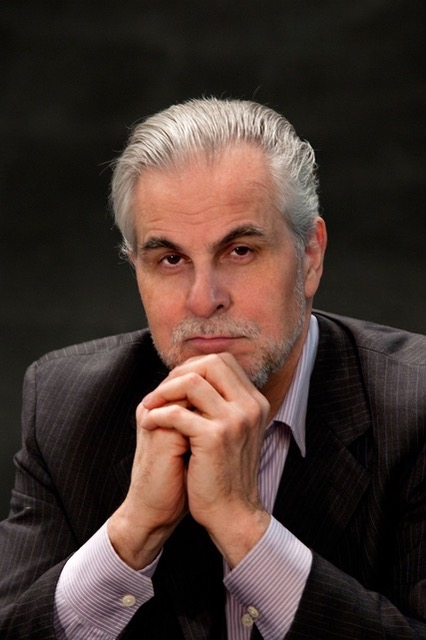
Photograph of opera conductor Victor DeRenzi

Victor DeRenzi (born 1949) is an American and Italian conductor. He was the artistic director and principal conductor of the Sarasota Opera from 1982–2026.

== Early life ==
Victor DeRenzi was born and raised in the New York City borough of Staten Island. His father, Nicholas, was a dock worker; his mother, Maria, was a housewife. While in elementary school, encouraged by one of his teachers, DeRenzi saw his first opera, La forza del destino at a small company on Staten Island. DeRenzi was immediately taken with the art form. Following that performance of Forza, he appeared as a supernumerary, sang in the local opera chorus and conducted the offstage music for a performance of Tosca in the New York area.

DeRenzi graduated from Curtis High School on Staten Island where he played the bassoon and double bass. He continued onto Queen's College in New York and majored in music theory.

== Career ==
=== Beginnings ===
DeRenzi made his professional debut in New York City in 1969, where he conducted performances of Lucia di Lammermoor and various other operas. In a short period of time, he became an established musical name in New York City; conducting opera, choral music and symphonic works. He made his New York City Opera debut at Lincoln Center in 1978 where he conducted six productions as well as being associated with the Lyric Opera of Chicago, New Orleans Opera, and Opera Theatre of St. Louis, among others. Internationally, he was a guest conductor in the Canary Islands and Hong Kong as well as in Nice, Edmonton, Quebec City, Winnipeg, Hamilton, and L'Opera du Montreal, before dedicating his career to building Sarasota Opera.

=== Sarasota Opera ===
In 1982, he assumed the position of Artistic Director and Principal Conductor of the Sarasota Opera, conducting performances of Orpheus in the Underworld and The Turn of the Screw in his first season. During his leadership at Sarasota Opera, he supervised more than 1,500 performances of 122 different operas and conducted 900 of those performances. Having conducted more than 80 different operas his repertoire including operas by Wolfgang Amadeus Mozart, Igor Stravinsky, Leoš Janáček, as well as various 20th century operas, in addition to most major Italian operas. In May 2026, DeRenzi ended his 44-year tenure as Artistic Director when he officially left the company. He holds the record for the longest serving artistic director of any performing arts organization in the world.

=== "The Verdi Cycle" ===
In 1989, with a production of Rigoletto, DeRenzi started a project to perform all of Verdi's available music that would take the next 27 years to come to completion. This undertaking was known as "The Verdi Cycle". During this time, he became recognized as one of the world's leading conductors of Giuseppe Verdi. DeRenzi ended up conducting not only every opera of Giuseppe Verdi (including revised editions), but every note by the composer that has been made available. He is the only conductor in history to have accomplished this feat, and thereby, Sarasota Opera is the only organization to have completed this achievement.

=== Literature ===
DeRenzi has consulted on several books, including works by the renowned Verdi scholar George Martin, Verdi in America and Opera at the Bandstand. He also consulted on numerous critical editions of operas such as Pagliacci, Otello and I due Foscari for the University of Chicago Press and Bärenreiter. He conducted the first performances of the critical edition of Un giorno di regno in 2013. He has been a member of the Advisory Board for the American Institute for Verdi Studies and has compiled and edited two volumes of Verdi songs.

== Personal life ==
DeRenzi is married to Stephanie Sundine, a former soprano and retired stage director. Together they have a daughter.

== Recognitions ==
DeRenzi has been the recipient of many honors including Sarasota Mayor's Citation (2007), Leadership Award "Arts Champion" from the Sarasota Arts Alliance (2016), and One World Award from the Sarasota Sister Cities Association (2021). He has advised on many publications and was listed as one of "Sarasota's 100 Most Powerful People". In 2016 he was made a Order of the Star of Italy for his contribution to Italian culture.
