= Orange Court Hotel =

Coordinates: 28.5521°N 81.3796°W

The Orange Court Hotel was a historic Spanish Revival Orlando hotel constructed in 1924. It was demolished in 1990. The hotel features on historic postcards and is depicted in a mural in downtown Orlando. It was located at 650 North Orange Avenue. G.A. Miller of Tampa constructed the building on a design by architect G. Lloyd Preacher of Atlanta. The hotel had 275 rooms, vine-covered balconies around a Spanish garden with more than 500 varieties of tropical plants, and a small orange grove where guests could pick fruit. The hotel was one of the first in Orlando with a steam-heated swimming pool.

The hotel closed in 1960 but reopened in 1962. It was put up for sale in 1985 for $5.5 million, and at the time it hosted both permanent residents and nightly guests. The owners could not find a buyer and ended up evicting all of the tenants in November 1989. The hotel site was finally sold in 1997 for $2.38 million.
