= Sarasota Opera House =

Historic theater in Sarasota, Florida

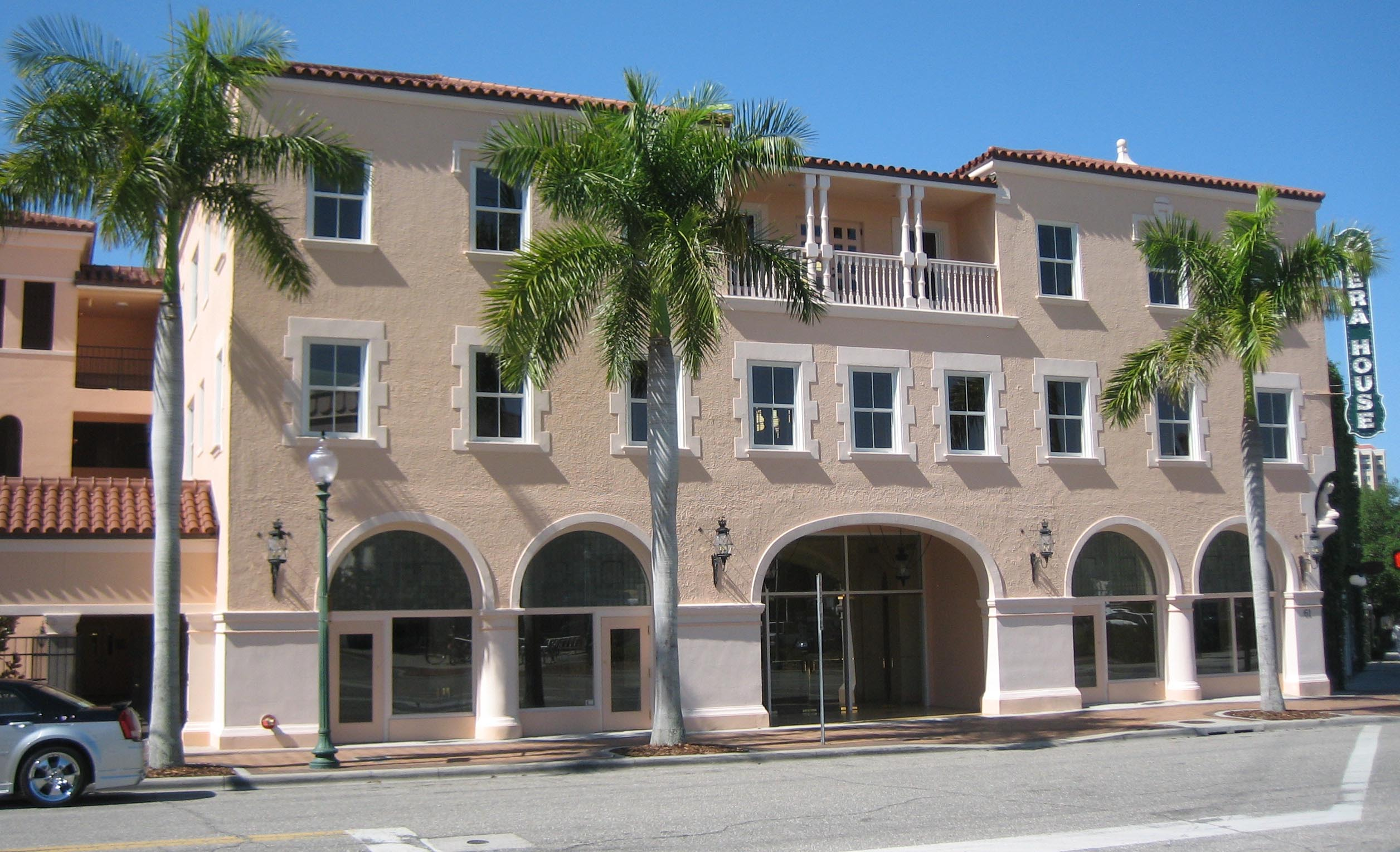
- Renovations to the exterior and interior in 2007-08
- Former names: Edwards Theatre

General information
- Architectural style: Mediterranean Revival
- Location: 61 North Pineapple Avenue, United States
- Coordinates: 27°20′12″N 82°32′38″W
- Opened: April 10, 1926

Technical details
- Floor count: 3

Design and construction
- Architect: Roy A. Benjamin
- Main contractor: G.A. Miller
- Edwards Theatre
- U.S. National Register of Historic Places
- Location within Florida Location within the United States
- MPS: Sarasota MRA
- NRHP reference No.: 84003835
- Added to NRHP: March 22, 1984

The Sarasota Opera House (originally the Edwards Theatre) is a historic theater building used as an opera house at 61 North Pineapple Avenue in Sarasota, Florida. The building was the vision of A.B. Edwards, the first mayor of Sarasota. It opened on April 10, 1926, with a three-story entrance containing eight shops on the ground floor, 12 offices on the second floor, and 12 furnished apartments on the third. The theatre's auditorium contained an orchestral pipe organ. The Sarasota Herald-Tribune hailed Edwards for "having admitted Sarasota into a fairyland of costly decoration, rich furnishings and never to be forgotten artistry."

The building was designed by Roy A. Benjamin in Mediterranean Revival Style Architecture and constructed by the GA Miller Construction Company.

The theatre is the home of the Sarasota Opera Association, Inc., which owns the building. The Association is the parent body that runs the Sarasota Opera. It has 1,119 seats.

== Early history ==
In the 1920s, the building quickly became a popular entertainment venue with major performers such as Will Rogers (in 1927) and the Ziegfeld Follies (1928) appearing there. The world premiere of Cecil B. DeMille's The Greatest Show on Earth (which had been filmed in Sarasota) was shown there in late 1951, attended by its stars Charlton Heston and Dorothy Lamour. Elvis Presley performed a concert there on February 21, 1956.

Over the years, managements changed as did the name of the theatre: in December 1936 it became The Florida Theatre while, in the same year, a hurricane damaged the Robert-Morton pipe organ. Various attempts to modernize removed most of its original Art Deco features. It then became a full-time movie theater, but in 1973, it closed.

== Renovations ==
By the early 1970s, the non-profit Asolo Opera Guild began to present small-scale operas in Sarasota from out-of-town in the 320-seat Asolo Theater. By 1974, the group had begun to produce its own operas. In 1979, the Guild bought the old Edwards Theatre for $150,000. The structure required major renovations to restore the facility and to accommodate the demands of opera production, so the Association began work in 1982, resulting in the new Sarasota Opera House appearing on the National Register of Historic Places in March 1984.

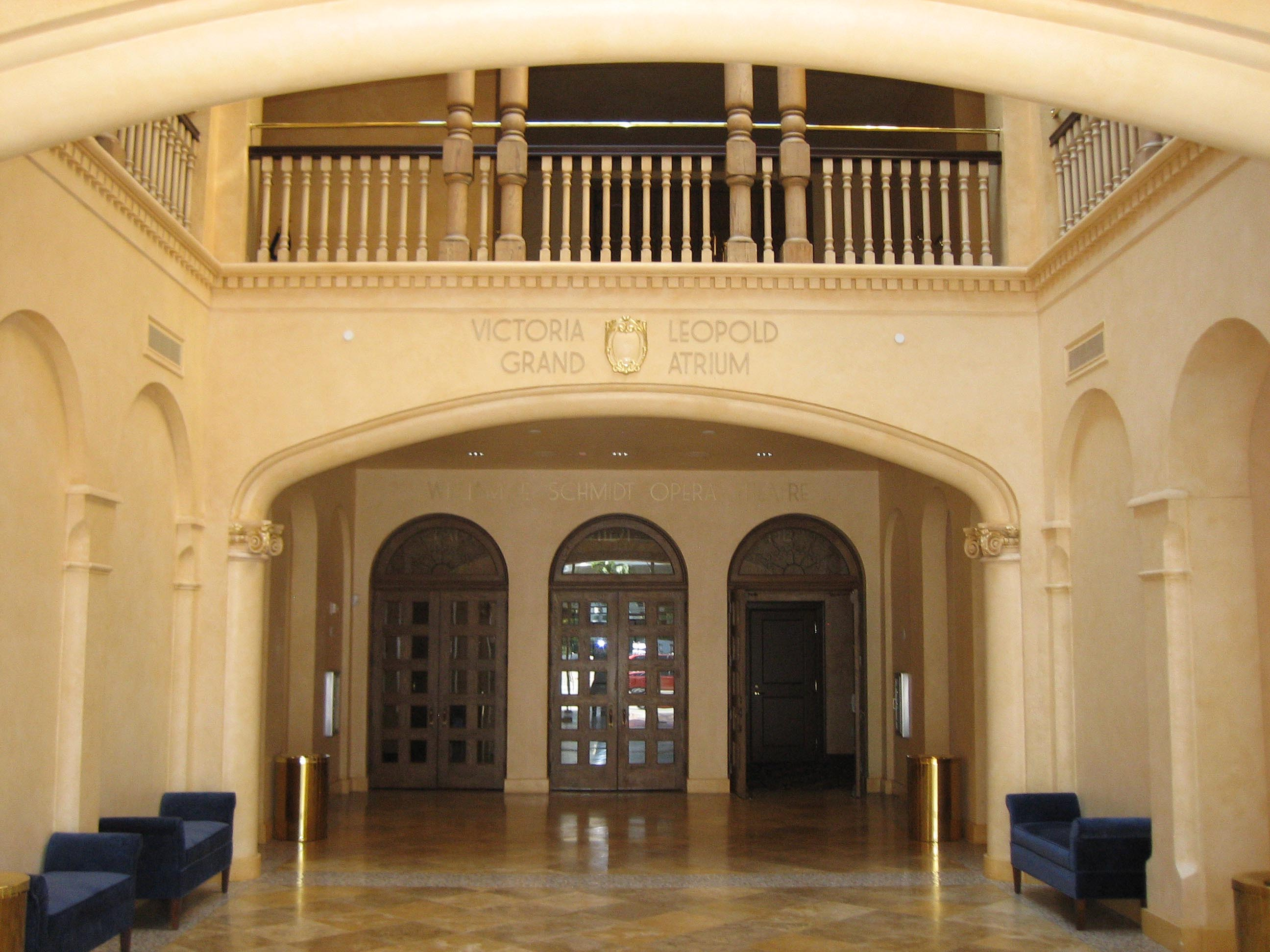
Original 3-story theatre atrium is revealed after renovations in 2007–2008

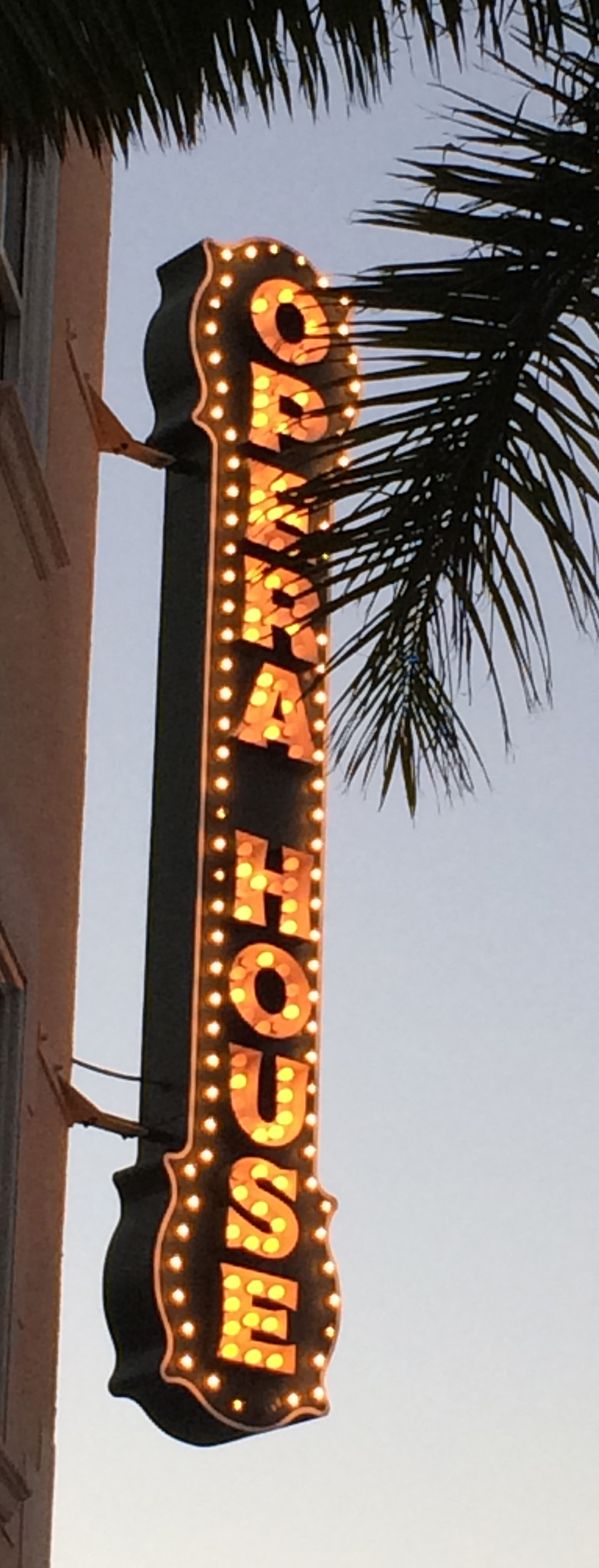
Sign outside Sarasota Opera House

Further renovations between the end of the 2007 season and the opening of the 2008 season have led to a significantly-enhanced opera theatre.

The $20 million renovation included gutting the auditorium, which resulted in a newly configured seating plan; expansion of the public areas and Opera Club on the second level; re-opening the 3-story atrium, which was covered with a newly-installed skylight. The atrium and skylight was original to the building in 1926, but was covered by a ceiling and a chandelier used in the film, Gone with the Wind. In 2008, the Sarasota Opera reopened with Verdi's Rigoletto. Seating was expanded to approximately 1,200, however, after the 2009-2010 season, some seats along the far sides were removed and replaced with aisles leaving 1,119 seats.
