= Andrew McAnsh =

Scottish-American businessman (1874–1946)

- Born: 1874; Scotland
- Died: October 23, 1946 (aged 71–72); Chicago, Illinois
- Occupation: Businessman
- Known for: Involvement in Sarasota, Florida

Andrew McAnsh (1874 – October 23, 1946) was a Scottish-American businessman. He lived in the Chicago area for most of his life and was active in that area. McAnsh would play a prominent role in the development of Sarasota, Florida, being a real estate developer there.

== Early life and career ==
Andrew McAnsh was born in Scotland in 1874. He would be the son of John and Christina (McGill) McAnsh. He and his family immigrated to North America when he was 5 or 6 years old. His family would first live near Toronto before moving to Chicago two years later, where he spent most of his life living at. He would receive his education from public schools and a business college. McAnsh originally worked in the haberdashery industry before later moving onto the grocery and restaurant businesses. He would become active politically serving in the Chicago city assessor's office and would serve as a staff member to Illinois Governor John Riley Tanner.

He then start to become active in furniture manufacturing opening factories in several states including: Wisconsin, Michigan and North Carolina. At some point he began to do construction and real estate work.

== Time in Sarasota ==
After moving to Sarasota (where he was given a hero's welcome) from Chicago in 1922, McAnsh founded the Mira Mar Corporation and began developing the Mira Mar Apartments (which took less than sixty days to build). He subsequently built the Mira Mar Hotel (in less than a year) and the Mira Mar Casino. McAnsh struck a deal with the Sarasota civic authorities and arranged for the hotel, apartments and casino to be supplied with free power and water, as well as exemption from property taxes, for the first ten years of its existence. In doing so, he took advantage of an offer previously provided to John Ringling, which Ringling had turned down.

With his wife Bertha Deegan McAnsh, he had two children. His wife would die on June 10, 1945. McAnsh would be a 32nd Degree Mason. He would spend the winters in Sarasota until he died on October 23, 1946, in Chicago.

He is listed as a Great Floridian.
