= Mira Mar Hotel =

Coordinates: 27.3354°N 82.5435°W

Mira Mar Hotel was a historic hotel building built in 1924 in Sarasota, Florida and demolished in 1982. It closed in the 1960s, sat vacant, and was converted into the Main Palm Plaza Building. Before being torn down it was used as a retirement hotel. It was replaced with a parking lot. It was located behind the Mira Mar Apartments at Main Street and Palm Avenue, and the Mira Mar Auditorium was across the street. The hotel hosted the rich and famous, while the auditorium was said to be the go-to place for entertainment. A Sarasota Times article stated: "It is safe to say that the erection of the Mira-Mar Hotel has meant as much to the development of Sarasota as any one enterprise that has yet located here." The Mira Mar was a project of developer Andrew McAnsh and was constructed by G.A. Miller.
