= Sarasota Opera =

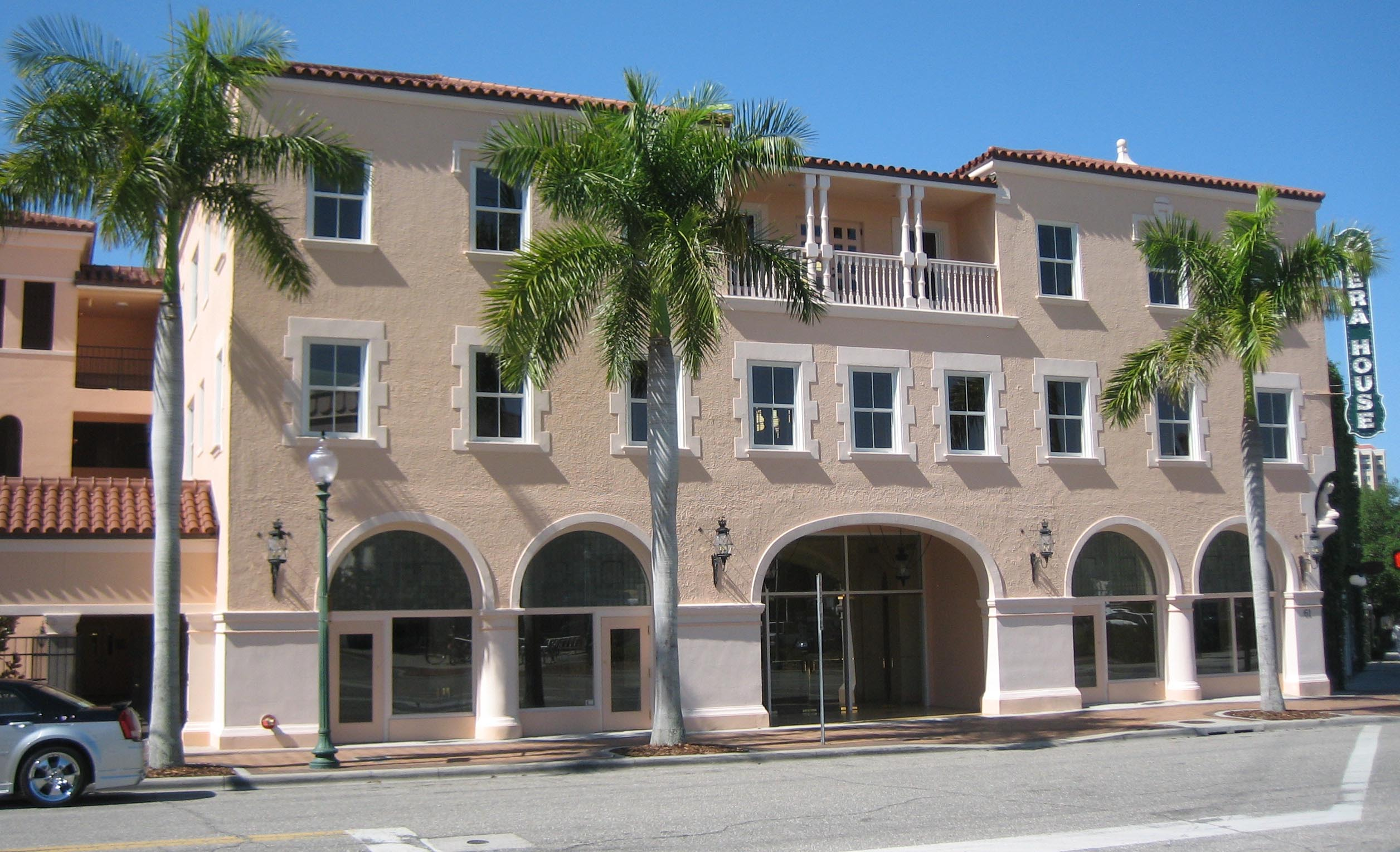
Sarasota Opera House, late March 2008, after complete interior and exterior renovation

Sarasota Opera is a professional opera company in Sarasota, Florida, USA, which was founded as the Asolo Opera Guild and, until 1974, presented a visiting company's productions. Between 1974 and 1979, it set about mounting its own productions in the same venue until, in 1979, it acquired the Edwards Theatre, which became the Sarasota Opera House in 1984. The house underwent a further renovation in 2008, creating a 1,119-seat venue.

In addition to two or three operas in the popular repertoire, each season typically includes an opera as part of the long-running "Verdi Cycle", the company's planned presentations of every Verdi opera, and one in the "Masterworks Revival" series.

== Company history ==
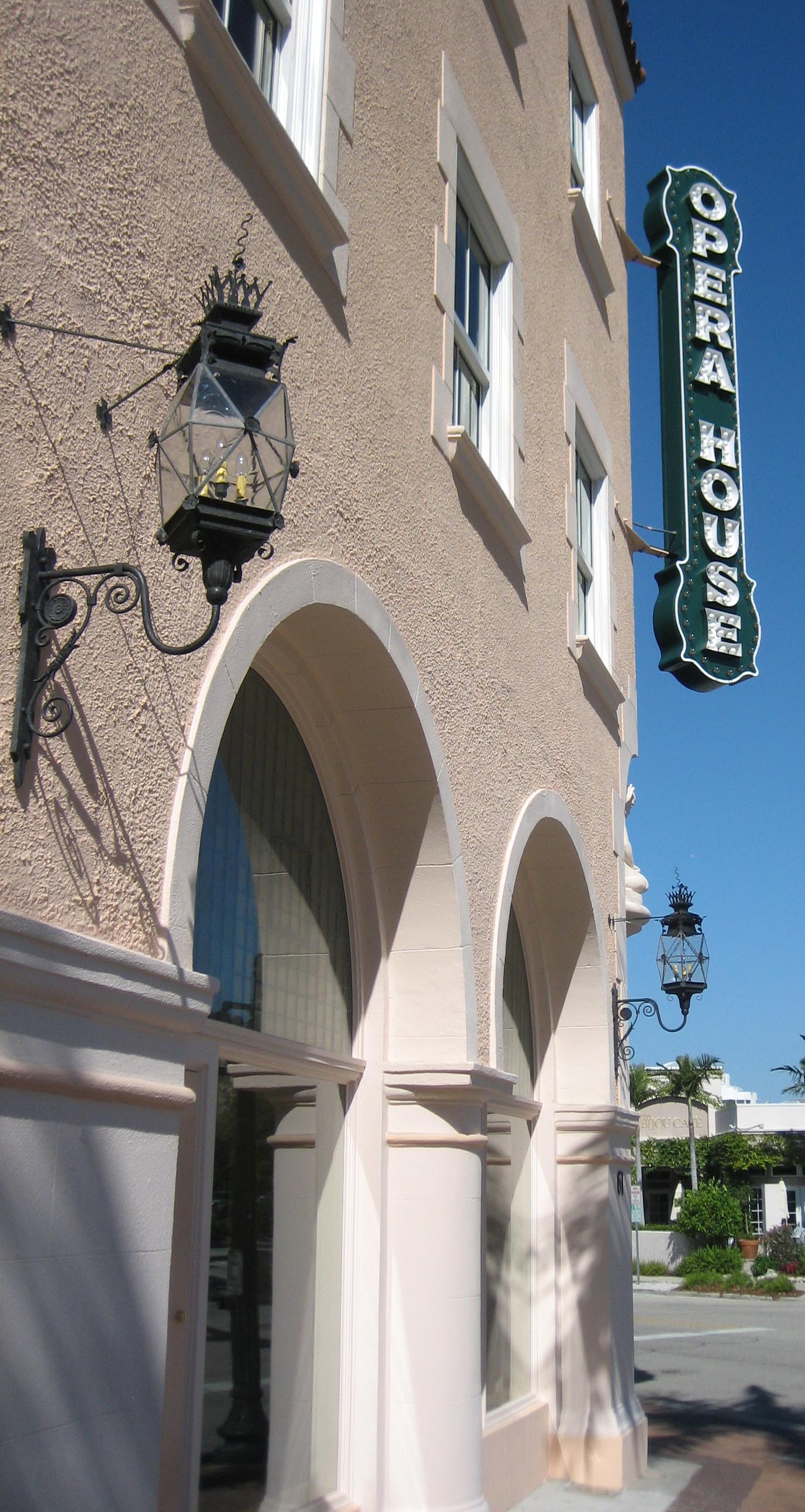
Sarasota Opera House, late March 2008.

Initially bringing the Turnau Opera of Woodstock, New York to perform chamber-sized operas at the historic Asolo Theater on the grounds of the John and Mable Ringling Museum of Art, the guild then began mounting its own productions, also at the Asolo, in 1974, but when it acquired the Edwards Theatre in 1979, the company set about a rehabilitation of the old vaudeville and movie theater and opened it in 1984.

Under the artistic direction of Victor DeRenzi since 1982 and executive director Richard Russell, the company presents its Winter Opera Festival in February and March, usually offering four fully staged operas with the Sarasota Opera Orchestra. The repertoire includes standard works as well as lesser known operas.

In March 2008, the Sarasota Opera House reopened after a $20 million renovation with Verdi's Rigoletto, and in the same year, the company added its first fully staged fall production, Rossini's The Barber of Seville bringing the number of operas presented in a season to five. For the most part, the Fall operas have been popular favourites, but in 2012, it presented Daron Hagen's world premiere opera, Little Nemo in Slumberland.

=== Characteristic features of the company ===
- Verdi Cycle

One of the company's longest standing initiatives is the Verdi Cycle, an effort—which began in 1989—to perform all of the works of Giuseppe Verdi, including every one of his operas (as well as all alternative versions), all his orchestral and chamber music, as well as the Requiem. In recent years, the Verdi Cycle operas have included I due Foscari, Giovanna d'Arco, I Lombardi and Otello. In 2009, the company staged performances of the composer's Don Carlo in the four-act version of 1884 (the "La Scala" version) in French. At the time, this was the largest opera ever presented by the company.

The first grand opera which Verdi wrote for Paris, Jérusalem (a revised version of the 1843 I Lombardi), was given in French in 2014, while his first comedy, Un giorno di regno, appeared in 2013. Don Carlos, in the original, 5-act, Paris version in French was performed in 2015.

The 2016 Winter Festival Season brought the completion of the 28-year Verdi Cycle on March 20, 2016 making Sarasota Opera the only company in the world to have performed every work, operatic and non-operatic, available for performance by Giuseppe Verdi and Maestro Victor DeRenzi the only conductor in the world to have conducted every available work by Giuseppe Verdi. The season culminated in a Verdi Festival Week, March 15–20, which included performances of the final two Verdi operas to be performed as part of the cycle, La battaglia di Legnano and Aida, two concerts dedicated to the music of Verdi, a two-day International Verdi Conference in partnership with the American Institute for Verdi Studies, and a 28-year retrospective exhibit on the Verdi Cycle. Distinguished guests included two of Giuseppe Verdi's great-great-grandchildren, Maria Mercedes Carrara Verdi and Angiolo Carrara Verdi, Gloria Marina Bellelli, Consul General of Italy, and Enzo Petrolini, President of the Club dei 27.

In June of 2016 and in recognition for his role in bringing the Verdi Cycle to completion, Maestro DeRenzi was knighted by the Italian government, receiving the title of Cavaliere dell’ordine della Stella d’Italia (Knight of the Order of the Star of Italy).

- Sarasota Firsts Initiative

Starting this fall, Sarasota Opera will launch a new venture entitled "Sarasota Firsts" in which the company will present operas never previously produced on the Sarasota Opera House stage. For the 2016/2017 season, Sarasota Opera will present three operas in association with this new series which will be Don Pasquale by Gaetano Donizetti, L'italiana in Algeri by Gioachino Rossini, and Dialogues of the Carmelites by Francis Poulenc. The season will also include Madama Butterfly by Giacomo Puccini and L'amore dei tre re by Italo Montemezzi.

- The Masterworks Revival Series,

The series includes presentations of neglected works of artistic merit. Operas presented in this series have included Alfredo Catalani's La Wally, Carl Nielsen's Maskarade, Engelbert Humperdinck's Königskinder, Stanisław Moniuszko's Halka, and Mascagni's L'amico Fritz.

The company also runs an Apprentice Program and a Studio Artists Program. Both programs provide young singers with additional training and performance opportunities in the chorus or other small roles in the company's productions.

- American Classics Series

The 2010-2011 opera season marked the beginning of Sarasota Opera's newest initiative, the American Classics Series, through which Sarasota Opera has made the commitment to produce one opera by an American composer each season. Robert Ward's opera, The Crucible based on the play by Arthur Miller, served as the inaugural production of this new series, and it was received with critical acclaim. The 2012 Festival Season featured Samuel Barber's Vanessa and, in 2013, the American Classic opera was Carlisle Floyd's Of Mice and Men. In 2013 the company announced that they would no longer continue this series, with Lawrence Johnson noting in London's Opera magazine that "Richard Russell, the company's new executive director, decided to pull the plug on the enterprising project due to lack of enthusiasm from the company's local patron base, heavy on seniors who prefer conservative repertoire".

- Youth Opera

The Sarasota Youth Opera program, begun in 1984, is the most comprehensive training program designed for young people ages 8 to 18 currently in the United States. The program admits all who apply, regardless of skill level, and provides instruction in the musical and theatrical aspects of opera. In recent years, the Sarasota Youth Opera has mounted world premieres on Sarasota's stage, the best-known being The Language of Birds, and gave the United States premiere of Canadian composer Dean Burry's opera The Hobbit in 2008. In 2010, the Sarasota Youth Opera presented the opera The Black Spider by Judith Weir. Sarasota Opera presented the world premiere of Little Nemo in Slumberland, an opera the company commissioned with music by Daron Hagen and words by J.D. McClatchy, in November 2012. On November 12, 2016, the Sarasota Youth Opera will perform The Secret World of Og also by the Canadian composer Dean Burry based on the popular children's novel by Pierre Berton.

- The Da Capo Society

First launched in 2016, the Da Capo Society is an organization for younger opera enthusiasts, roughly ages 21 to 40, dedicated to promoting and enjoying opera. Members enjoy discounted prices and meet to socialize before and after shows, as well as gaining access to behind-the-scenes conversations with visiting artists. Members are encouraged to bring guests, as a central goal of the organization is to cultivate a younger audience for the opera.

=== Sarasota Opera House ===
For a more detailed article on the opera house, see Sarasota Opera House

Recognizing the need for a larger theater with an orchestra pit, the guild purchased the then-closed A. B. Edwards Theatre, which had been renamed as the Florida Theatre in December 1936. The theater had been built in 1926 by an important early resident of Sarasota, Arthur Britton Edwards, as a versatile performance venue that could be adapted for vaudeville or as a movie house. The guild members renovated the building beginning in 1982. The next year the A. B. Edwards Theatre was listed on the National Register of Historic Places, and was reopened as the Sarasota Theatre of the Arts in 1984. The name was changed to the Sarasota Opera House a few years later. From 2007 until the opening of the new season on 1 March 2008, the opera house was extensively remodeled and updated throughout its interior and exterior. The $20 million renovations included a gutting of the auditorium, resulting in a newly configured seating plan, expansion of the public areas and Opera Club on the second level, and the opening up of the atrium to reveal a newly installed skylight system, which had existed in the 1926 building. The orchestra pit was also enlarged and expanded to accommodate the larger orchestras needed to perform the later works of Verdi (Otello, Don Carlos, Aida), as well as Puccini's Turandot. Seating in the hall has been expanded to 1,119.
