= Nicholas Cosmo =

Italian-American businessman

Nicholas Cosmo (born 1971) is an American former businessman and white-collar criminal. He was arrested January 26, 2009 on charges of an estimated $370–413 million Ponzi scheme. Cosmo conducted the scheme using his company Agape World Inc. in Hauppauge, New York, which claimed to make its profits via commercial bridge lending. Authorities arrested him in Hicksville, New York.

Cosmo was arraigned in Islip, New York on January 27, 2009 on charges of mail fraud. Cosmo had previously been convicted of felony fraud in 1999, and had served his sentence of 21 months in prison for the offense.

On October 14, 2011, Cosmo was sentenced to 25 years in prison. As of 2013, it was reported that his crimes were then the 8th largest financial fraud in history, since the first documented flimflam in 1719 involving Scotsman John Law.

== Agape World ==
Prosecutors stated that Nick Cosmo used $212,000 in Agape funds to pay restitution from the 1999 federal mail fraud conviction.

Prosecutors were able to trace only $10 million of bridge loans that were made. $80 million to $100 million was allegedly lost in commodity-futures trading and $55 to $63 million of investors' funds went to pay the broker's commissions.

The complaint against Agape World stated that many of the employees had criminal records. Postal inspectors said Cosmo paid the brokers, some of whom were ex-convicts with records that included robbery and heroin importation, to recruit investors.

One of the largest assets of Agape World was an indoor athletic complex in Hauppauge, New York. Cosmo had purchased the 38,000-square-foot (3,500 m^{2}) building for $3.85 million in 2008, then spent another $1 million to transform the former paintball arena into indoor athletic fields. The building was the most valuable asset in Cosmo's holdings to be liquidated by the bankruptcy trustee, Silverman Acampora, and was auctioned of for $3.5 million, in June 2009, to a company called Coastal Sports.

== Cosmo posts bail ==
As of June 2009, Cosmo was unable to post bail. Judge Hurley would not release Cosmo until several conditions were met, including a requirement that Cosmo's relatives agreed to back a $1.25 million bail package secured by their homes and financial accounts.

Cosmo, chief executive of a private suburban New York investment firm indicted for a $400 million fraud, was freed from jail after it took months for him to make bail.

A U.S. judge released Cosmo on $1.25 million bail secured by property and frozen bank accounts but ruled he would be confined to his home under electronic monitoring on New York's Long Island.

== Judge revokes Cosmo's bail ==
In October 2009, a federal judge found that Cosmo couldn't be trusted and ended his house arrest after less than three months and returned him to jail to await trial.

U.S. District Judge Denis R. Hurley, at a hearing in Central Islip, New York, ordered that Cosmo be jailed pending trial after prosecutors alleged he used a computer and tried to transfer assets in violation of his bail conditions and provided false statements to a U.S. Pretrial Services officer.

== Cosmo pleads guilty to $413 million Ponzi scheme ==
Cosmo pled guilty to mail and wire fraud charges on Friday October 29, 2010, and faced up to 40 years in prison. On October 14, 2011, he was sentenced to 25 years in jail. "Those who lie and steal from the investing public are on notice that they face severe penalties", U.S. Attorney Loretta Lynch in Brooklyn said today in a statement. "As recounted today in court by several of his victims, the defendant's actions crushed the hopes and dreams of everyday citizens".

On April 25, 2012, a criminal complaint was unsealed in federal court in Central Islip, New York charging Jason Keryc, Anthony Massaro, Anthony Ciccone, and Diane Kaylor, former account representatives of Hauppauge, New York-based Agape World Inc. and Agape Merchant Advance (AMA), for their participation in a large-scale Ponzi scheme.

== SEC charges 14 Agape World Ponzi scheme brokers ==
The Securities and Exchange Commission has charged 14 former sales agents, including four pairs of siblings, for misleading investors while earning more than $52 million in commissions in the $400 million Agape World Ponzi scheme.

The SEC alleged the sales agents falsely promised investor returns as high as 12 – 14 percent, in several weeks when they sold investments offered by Hauppauge-based Agape World. They also misled investors to believe that only 1 percent of their principal was at risk. The Agape securities they peddled were actually non-existent, and investors were merely lured into a Ponzi scheme where earlier investors were paid with new investor funds, according to the SEC.

== Brokers sentenced ==
Jason Keryc, formerly of Hauppauge-based Agape World, was sentenced to nine years in prison by U.S. District Judge Denis Hurley in Central Islip, New York, and ordered to pay $179 million of restitution, prosecutors said. U.S. Attorney Robert Capers in a statement said the sentence ensures that Keryc, 38, "will now pay the price for his self-enrichment and deceit." Keryc's sentencing came after a federal jury in April found him and another ex-employee, Diane Kaylor, guilty on charges including securities fraud, conspiracy, mail fraud, and wire fraud. Prosecutors said Keryc spent some of the $8.9 million he made off the scheme on a million-dollar vacation home in Montauk, a condominium in Long Beach, NY, automobiles, jewelry and designer clothing
